= Second Chen–Chiang summit =

The Second Chen–Chiang summit (Chinese: 第二次陳江會談; pinyin: Dì Èr Cì Chén Jiāng Huìtán) was part of a series of the Chen-Chiang summit of cross-strait meetings. It was the first major meeting between the Association for Relations Across the Taiwan Straits (ARATS) and Straits Exchange Foundation (SEF) leaders in Taiwan. The meeting lasted from November 3 to 7, 2008 in Taipei, Taiwan.

== Background ==
In the past, planes had to fly into Hong Kong airspace while traveling between the two sides. At the time, the meeting was one of the highest-level exchanges between officials from mainland China and Taiwan since 1949, when the Kuomintang, the party led by Chiang Kai-shek, lost the Chinese Civil War to the Communists and retreated to Taiwan.

== Pre-meeting ==
Earlier, on October 21, 2008, another Chinese envoy, Zhang Mingqing (張銘清), was pushed to the ground by Taiwan Independence activists in a scuffle in Tainan while visiting Taiwan. As a result, Taiwan police decided to mobilize a total of 7,000 officers for Chen's protection.

Opposition to Chen's visit also sparked massive peaceful rallies and protests organised by the opposition DPP on 25 October 2008. Preliminary estimates place the number of protesters at around 500,000. Protesters accused President Ma Ying-jeou "of making too many concessions and moving too fast in relaxing restrictions on trade and investment with China."

The night before the first day meeting, Chen Yun-lin was trapped by protesters at the Grand Formosa Regent Taipei hotel, while attending a banquet. Hundreds of protesters surrounded the hotel, chanting, throwing eggs and burning Chinese flags, according to news agencies. The riot police clashed with the protesters, and dozens of people were injured.

== Meeting ==
Following an invitation issued by the SEF at the first meeting, the head of ARATS, Chen Yunlin, began a visit to Taiwan on 3 November 2008. Items on the agenda raised by SEF Chairman Chiang Pin-kung included direct maritime shipping, chartered cargo flights, direct postal service, and co-operation in ensuring food safety, in response to the 2008 Chinese milk scandal, while ARATS chairman Chen Yunlin raised the matters of direct freight service, and opening up air routes that directly cross the Taiwan Strait. Previous routes avoided crossing the Strait for security reasons, with planes detouring through Hong Kong or Japan air control areas. Chen paid a visit to the wife of Koo Chen-fu, a former SEF chairman who died in 2005.

The official talk between leaders of the SEF and ARATS was held in the morning of November 4. Both sides held press conferences. On November 4, 2008, mainland China's Chen Yun-lin met with his Taiwanese counterpart, Chiang Pin-kung, head of Taiwan's Straits Exchange Foundation (SEF). Together, they signed the 2008 Taiwan-China Cross Straits Economic Pact providing for direct passenger flights across the 100-mile-wide Taiwan Strait that separates Taiwan from mainland China.

ARATS and SEF signed a number of agreements in Taipei. The agreement relating to direct passenger flights increased the number of charter flights from 36 to 108 per week, operating daily instead of the four days a week previously. Flights would now operate to and from 21 Chinese cities. Flights would also take a more direct route. Private business jet flights would also be allowed. The agreement relating to cargo shipping allowed direct shipping between 11 seaports in Taiwan and 63 in China. The shipping would be tax-free. The agreement relating to cargo flights provided for up to 60 direct cargo flights per month. Finally, an agreement was made to set up food safety alerts between the two sides.

In a conference at the Taipei Guest House, Ma reiterated his three-point China policy of “no independence,” “no unification” and “no war” across the strait. Ma said Chen signed four agreements with Chiang Pin-kung, chairman of the Straits Exchange Foundation (SEF), on shortened air routes, direct maritime shipping, better mail service and food safety.

In the morning, Chen met Legislative Speaker Wang Jin-pyng, attended the opening of two cross-straits seminars and lunched with People First Party chairman James Soong. During the afternoon, he toured the Hsinchu Science Park. Chen Yun-lin's final public engagement was a dinner with Kuomintang chairman Wu Poh-hsiung at Taipei's Grand Formosa Regent Hotel. The venue became a magnet for hundreds of protesters. Ma pointed out, “the Republic of China is an independent, sovereign state which has existed for 97 years. That is the fact nobody can change!"

President Ma Ying-jeou met with Chen Yun-lin at the Taipei Guest House at 11:00 am on November 6, 2008. The meeting between Ma and Chen lasted only five minutes. The two officials exchanged gifts. Chen presented Ma with a painting of a horse (Ma's surname means horse), and Ma gave Chen a piece of fine porcelain.

Chen offered Nyssaceae seedlings, a rare plant that only grows in mainland China, to Ma, along with two pandas. In return Ma offered an indigenous goat naemorhedus swinhoei and a spotted deer as gifts.

Consistent with the 1992 Consensus, Chen did not refer to Ma as "President". Similarly, the representatives from Taiwan did not refer to the PRC leader Hu Jintao as "President of China", but called him "CCP General Secretary" in the previous meeting in Beijing.

Chen addressed Ma as You, and avoided addressing Ma as president. Doing so would have implied that the mainland recognizes the legitimacy of the Republic of China. The question of how Chen would address Ma was much discussed by political analysts on both sides.

On November 7, 2008, Chen and Chiang Pin-kung participated in a farewell ceremony at the Grand Hotel in Taipei.

== Aftermath ==
=== DPP ===
Democratic Progressive Party chairwoman Tsai Ing-wen (蔡英文) criticized the government for taking Taiwan back to martial law for the sake of one Chinese visitor.

=== Kuomintang ===
President Ma Ying-jeou blamed unruly protesters on poor organization on the part of the opposition Democratic Progressive Party and its chairwoman, Tsai Ing-wen. Ma also accused DPP Secretary-General Wang Tuo of reneging on his promise of peaceful demonstrations. Ma described Tsai's managing of protests as a "road [Tsai] knows little about and a thing she is not good at doing" which yielded "unexpected consequences." All told, the police department reported 149 of its officers injured during the protests.

=== Students ===
About 400 students, led by assistant professor of sociology at National Taiwan University Lee Ming-tsung (李明璁), started the sit-in in front of the Executive Yuan on November 6 at noon after violent oppression of previous protest by policemen. The students call themselves Wild Strawberry student movement and believe that police, while protecting the safety of Chen and his delegation, acted improperly and that freedom of speech had been suppressed. The sit-ins now lasting for over a month have three demands

1. An open apology from President Ma Ying-jeou and Premier Liu Chao-shiuan to all citizens
2. The resignation of National Police Agency Director-General Wang Cho-chiun (王卓鈞) and National Security Bureau Director Tsai Chaoming (蔡朝明)
3. The swift amendment of the Parade and Assembly Law (集會遊行法).

=== Self-immolation ===
An 80-year-old man, a former KMT member named Liu Bai-yan (劉柏煙), sets himself on fire at Taipei Liberty Square. He suffered from 80% body burns. His suicide note referred to Chen as follows: "When Chen Yun-lin met with the President [Ma Ying-jeou], he pointed his finger at the President, saying "you, you, you". I think, the President looked quite content, smiling a little. Is the President's name "you, you, you"? As a member of Kuomintang, I am embarrassed by this display. If the mainland sends over someone higher, shouldn't the President kneel?" Liu died on December 14, 2008.

During Chen's visit to Taipei, he was met with a series of strong protests directed at himself and Ma Ying-jeou, some of which were violent with Molotov cocktails being thrown by the protesters at riot police. A series of arrests were made after the protests. Local police reported that 149 of its officers were injured during the opposition protests.

== Public opinion ==
Government's polls have suggested that Chen Yunlin's visit and the government's policy of normalising cross-strait relations have support of 50% to 60% of the Taiwanese population.

The polls in two of Taiwan's biggest newspapers after the visit still reported that about 50% of the Taiwanese public considered Chen's visit to have a positive effect on Taiwan's development, while 20% of the respondents thought the effect would be negative. The China Post reported that some polls have indicated that the public may be pleased with Chen's visit, with about 50% of the Taiwanese public considering Chen's visit to have a positive effect on Taiwan's development, while 18 to 26% of the respondents thought the effect would be negative. In another poll, it suggested that 26% of the respondents were satisfied with the DPP Chairwoman Tsai Ing-wen's handling of the crowds in the series of protests, while 53% of the respondents were unsatisfied. The same poll also showed that 33% of the respondents were satisfied with President Ma's performance at his meeting with Chen Yunlin, while 32% of the respondents were not satisfied.

== See also ==
- Chen-Chiang summit

== Internet video ==
- Documentary on the visit of communist official Chen Yun-lin when Taiwan police pulled down Blue Sky White Sun Flag
- (in Chinese)破黑箱．顧飯碗 綠號召十萬人上街 15 December 2009 民視新聞
- (in Chinese)民進黨邀台聯1220遊行 估逾10萬人

== Additional source ==
- (in Chinese)會胡志強 蘇嘉全建議陳雲林不要趴趴走 【12/19 19:35】
- (in Chinese)高為邦：陳雲林是「迫害台商的首謀份子」
- (in Chinese)揭穿陳雲林視察災區等三個謬論 林保華
- (in Chinese)《林保華專論》我們向陳雲林抗議甚麼？
- (in Chinese)陳雲林：相信台方能保護代表團的安全和尊嚴
- (in Chinese)活捉陳雲林？ 民進黨：個人言論
- (in Chinese)「破黑箱、顧飯碗」大遊行 綠營發布「反共」動員令
- (in Chinese)陳雲林訪台 民進黨大遊行 星島日報報道
- (in Chinese)陳雲林今抵台 明簽署四協議 The Liberty Times
- (in Chinese)層層拒馬封街 民怨：回到戒嚴 The Liberty Times
- (in Chinese)馬對中軟趴趴 各行業皮皮剉 醫界擔憂 台灣人沒頭路 The Liberty Times
- (in Chinese)向中國怒吼 要陳雲林好看 The Liberty Times
- (in Chinese)陳雲林沒走機場大門 抗議撲空 聯合晚報
- (in Chinese)假飛彈、沖天炮 瞄準陳雲林 The Liberty Times
- (in Chinese)江陳會／陳雲林設宴回請 江丙坤脫口「馬總統」(2009/12/22 )
