= Sixth Chen–Chiang summit =

The Sixth Chen–Chiang summit (Chinese: 第六次陳江會談; pinyin: Dì Liù Cì Chén Jiāng Huìtán) is the 6th part of the Chen-Chiang summit of cross-strait meetings. It is held between the Association for Relations Across the Taiwan Straits (ARATS) represented by Chen Yun-lin and Straits Exchange Foundation (SEF) represented by Chiang Pin-kung.

== Meeting ==
The sixth meeting was held on 20-22 December 2010 at Grand Hotel, Taipei, Taiwan. SEF had 21 representatives, while ARATs had 20 representatives, both with notable people from the health industry.

Chen Yunlin signed an agreement on sharing medical information and cooperating in development of new drugs. On the second day Chen Yun-lin sat down to talk with minister of Mainland Affairs Council Lai Shin-Yuan about the many benefits of the collaborations along with Taiwan national dignity issue in cultural and sports events.

Lai referred to the controversy with the Contested judgement of taekwondo of 2010 Asian Games as well as Taiwanese actors and actresses being blocked from walking on the red carpet during the Tokyo International Film Festival after a Chinese delegation insisted that they add the word "China" to their country's name.

No Flag of the Republic of China were raised at the hotel. But according to the hotel manager, the flag is only raised during Double Ten Day and new years.

== Protests ==
On December 22 about 100 pro-Taiwan independence protesters appeared at Taipei Metro Jiannan Road Station to protest against what they alleged were CPC-KMT secretive conspiracy talks, Ma Ying-jeou selling out Taiwan and other complaints about Lai Shin-Yuan. Other independence supporters also tried to get into the Neihu Grand victoria hotel where Lai and Chen would meet.

== Unsigned ==
The investment agreement was not signed due to complexity and sensitivity. One negotiator said that mainland was concerned about bringing international arbitrators to settle disputes. This move would elevate Taiwan's sovereignty status. For example, Taiwan has already been granted visa-free status in 2010 for the European Union Schengen Area.

== See also ==
- Cross-Strait relations
