= Seventh Chen–Chiang summit =

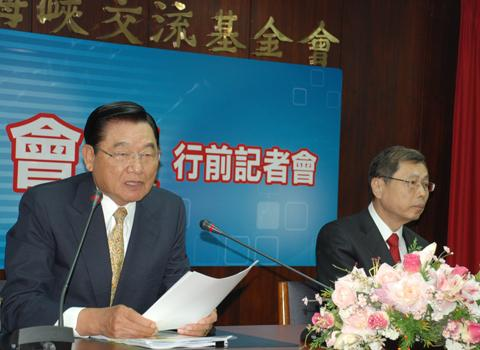
Chiang Pin-kung and Gao Kung-lian (高孔廉) at the meeting

The Seventh Chen–Chiang summit (第七次陳江會談) is part of a series of the Chen-Chiang summit of cross-strait meetings. It is held between the Association for Relations Across the Taiwan Straits (ARATS) represented by Chen Yun-lin and Straits Exchange Foundation (SEF) represented by Chiang Pin-kung.

== Meeting ==
The seventh meeting was held from October 19 to 21, 2011 at Tianjin, Mainland China. The two sides signed a nuclear safety pact. Under the agreement the two sides guarantee transparency of construction of nuclear plants and the monitoring of existing stations. In the meeting China said they have 14 nuclear reactors with 26 reactors under construction. This pact is to improve cooperation in case of disasters such as a tsunami. According to Next Magazine, currently the majority of nuclear reactors are in south China. Guangdong has the most with 33 reactors, the majority of them are right next to the Hong Kong border.

== Unsigned ==
The two sides failed to reach an agreement on Taiwan businessmen operations on the mainland. This would have covered: personal safety protection, dispute resolution and investment controls. Should anything go wrong, Taiwan wants to allow an international arbitrator involved. But Beijing does not want to involve any third parties in the process. Beijing also saw the investment protection pact as a bilateral agreement where Taiwan might be treated as a separate nation. Beijing was unwilling to face up to the Republic of China.
