= Fifth Chen–Chiang summit =

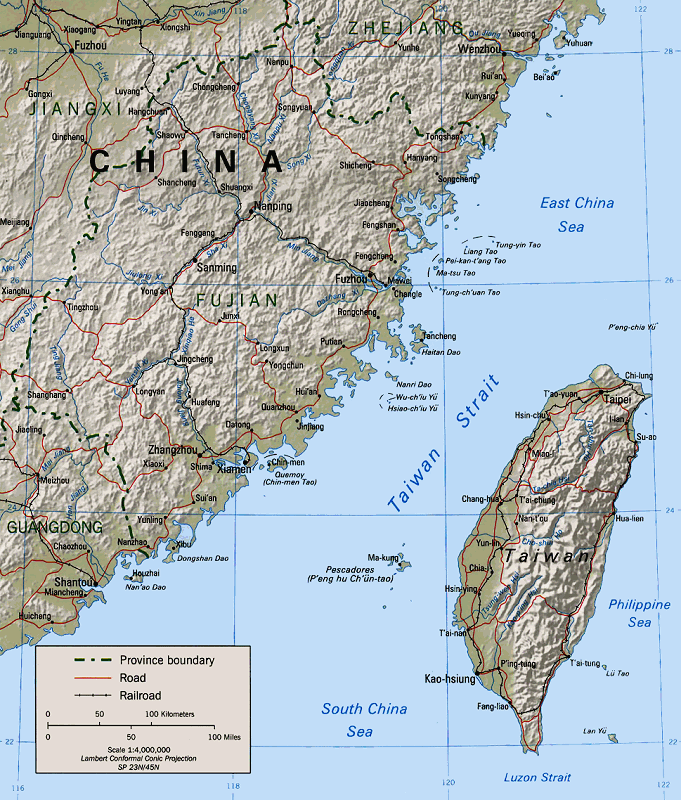
The Taiwan Straits separate Mainland China from the island of Taiwan

The Fifth Chen–Chiang summit (第五次陳江會談) was part of a series of the Chen-Chiang summit of cross-strait meetings between China and Taiwan. It was held between the Association for Relations Across the Taiwan Straits (ARATS) represented by Chen Yun-lin and Straits Exchange Foundation (SEF) represented by Chiang Pin-kung.

== Meeting ==
The event took place from June 28 to June 30, 2010, in Chongqing, People's Republic of China. The Economic Cooperation Framework Agreement (ECFA) was signed during the meeting on the 29th. Chongqing was chosen because the city has about 80,000 families that have a relationship with Taiwan. Chongqing was also on the list of Terry Gou's list of consideration for northern cities after the 2010 Foxconn suicides in southern city Shenzhen.

== See also ==
- Anti-ECFA protest
