= First Chen–Chiang summit =

2008 meeting in Beijing, China

The First Chen–Chiang summit (simplified Chinese: 第一次陈江会谈; traditional Chinese: 第一次陳江會談; pinyin: Dì Yī Cì Chén Jiāng Huìtán) was the first of a series of what would later become the Chen-Chiang summit of cross-strait meetings. The meeting was held between the Association for Relations Across the Taiwan Straits (ARATS) represented by Chen Yun-lin and Straits Exchange Foundation (SEF) represented by Chiang Pin-kung. This meeting followed the 1993 Wang–Koo summit.

The summit was a quick meeting that took place on 13 June 2008 in Beijing. Two agreements were signed. The first agreement was signed for weekend cross-strait chartered flights. The second agreement was signed for mainland tourists' travel to Taiwan island. The documents were signed in simplified Chinese characters and traditional Chinese characters and then exchanged.

Both claimed this atmosphere was very different compared to the 1993 Wang-Koo summit, when both were signing for China status. The wife of Chen and the wife of Chiang also entered the summit holding each other's hands and the atmosphere appeared happy.

== Meeting ==
A series of meetings were held between the SEF and the ARATS at Diaoyutai State Guesthouse in Beijing from 11 June 2008 to 14 June 2008. By convention, SEF–ARATS negotiations proceed in three rounds: a technical round led by negotiators seconded from the relevant government departments, a draft round led by deputy heads of the two organizations, and a formal round led by the heads of the two organizations. In this case, however, both sides have already reached broad consensus on these issues on both the technical and political levels through previous negotiations via the non-governmental and inter-party channels. As a result, the initial technical round was dispensed with, and the negotiations began with the second, draft round.

The two sides agreed to the following:

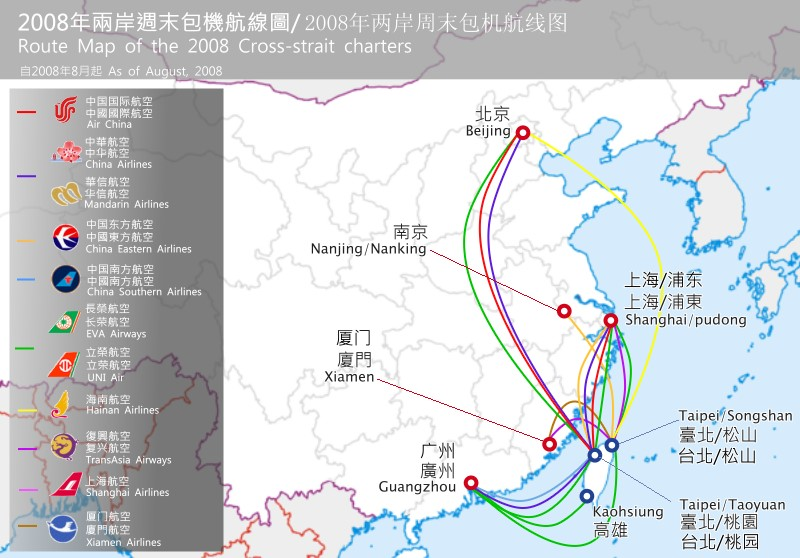
Route Map of the weekend cross-strait charter, for flights as of August 2008. (To make lines easy to distinguish, the actual path between cities is not shown accurately; flights to and from Taiwan had to pass through Hong Kong airspace at the time.)

- Initiate direct passenger airline services every weekend from 4 July 2008. Both parties agreed to negotiate the routes of cross-strait direct flights and establish direct communication procedures concerning air traffic management systems as soon as possible. But before the routes of direct flights are finalized, charter flights may temporarily fly across Hong Kong Flight Information Region. There is no need to stop in Hong Kong, but planes still have to fly through its airspace. Weekend charter flights shall fly from each Friday to the following Monday for a total of four full days.

PRC agreed to open the following five cities as destinations: Beijing, Shanghai (Pudong), Guangzhou, Xiamen and Nanjing. Mainland China shall open Chengdu, Chongqing, Hangzhou, Dalian, Guilin, Shenzhen and other destinations later on and other cities if so demanded by the market.

ROC agreed to open the following eight cities as destinations: Taoyuan, Kaohsiung (Siaogang), Taichung (Chingchunkang), Taipei (Sungshan), Penghu (Makung), Hualien, Kinmen and Taitung.

- Opening Taiwan to Chinese tourists. Both parties agreed that mainland Chinese tourists must travel to Taiwan in groups. Tourists must enter into, visit, and exit from Taiwan in groups. The maximum quota of tourists received by the party responsible for tourist reception shall not exceed the average of 3,000 persons per day, and each group shall consist of a minimum of ten persons and forty persons at the maximum, being in Taiwan for a maximum of ten days.
- However, in 2012, it was agreed by both parties that individual tourists from the PRC cities of Beijing, Shanghai, and Xiamen were allowed to visit Taiwan. Later, tourists from Chengdu, Chongqing, Nanjing, Hangzhou, Guangzhou, and Tianjin were allowed to visit Taiwan individually. Finally, Fuzhou, Jinan, and Xi'an were to join the list by the end of 2012. In 2019, the Chinese government stopped issuing permits for individual tourists to visit Taiwan, amid worsening cross-strait relations.

To facilitate the above, both sides also agreed to further discuss on the possibilities of exchanging representative offices, with an SEF office to be opened in Beijing and an ARATS office in Taipei to issue travel permits to cross-strait visitors, among other duties.

== See also ==
- Cross-Strait relations
- Chen–Chiang summit
