= Cross-strait high-level talks =

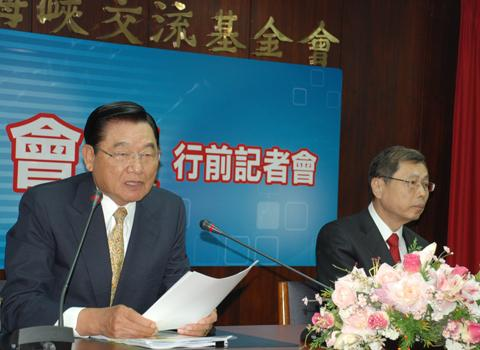
- 7th Chen–Chiang Summit in Tianjin between ARATS and SEF in October 2011
- Traditional Chinese: 兩岸兩會高層會談
- Simplified Chinese: 两岸两会高层会谈
Transcriptions
Standard Mandarin
- Hanyu Pinyin: Liǎng'àn liǎnghuì gāocéng huìtán
Yue: Cantonese
- Jyutping: loeng5 ngon6 loeng5 wui2 gou1 cang4

Chen–Chiang talks
- Traditional Chinese: 陳江會談
- Simplified Chinese: 陈江会谈
Transcriptions
Standard Mandarin
- Hanyu Pinyin: Chén jiāng huìtán

Chiang–Chen talks
- Traditional Chinese: 江陳會談
- Simplified Chinese: 江陈会谈
Transcriptions
Standard Mandarin
- Hanyu Pinyin: Jiāng chén huìtán

The cross-strait high-level talks were a series of meetings during the presidency of Ma Ying-jeou between

- the president of the Association for Relations Across the Taiwan Straits (ARATS), People's Republic of China and
- the chairman of the Straits Exchange Foundation (SEF), Republic of China (Taiwan).

The two semi-governmental organizations represent their respective governments to deal with the cross-strait relations. The first eight talks were called "Chen–Chiang talks" or "Chiang–Chen talks", named after the surnames of leaders: Chen Yunlin of ARATS and Chiang Pin-kung of SEF.

== Meetings ==
No.	Name	President of ARATS	Chairman of SEF	Time	Place
1	First Chen–Chiang summit	Chen Yunlin	Chiang Pin-kung	June 2008	(China) Beijing
2	Second Chen–Chiang summit	Chen Yunlin	Chiang Pin-kung	November 2008	(Taiwan) Taipei
3	Third Chen–Chiang summit	Chen Yunlin	Chiang Pin-kung	April 2009	(China) Nanjing
4	Fourth Chen–Chiang summit	Chen Yunlin	Chiang Pin-kung	December 2009	(Taiwan) Taichung
5	Fifth Chen–Chiang summit	Chen Yunlin	Chiang Pin-kung	June 2010	(China) Chongqing
6	Sixth Chen–Chiang summit	Chen Yunlin	Chiang Pin-kung	December 2010	(Taiwan) Taipei
7	Seventh Chen–Chiang summit	Chen Yunlin	Chiang Pin-kung	October 2011	(China) Tianjin
8	Eighth Chen–Chiang summit	Chen Yunlin	Chiang Pin-kung	August 2012	(Taiwan) Taipei
9	Ninth cross-strait high-level talks	Chen Deming	Lin Join-sane	June 2013	(China) Shanghai
10	Tenth cross-strait high-level talks	Chen Deming	Lin Join-sane	February 2014	(Taiwan) Taipei
11	Eleventh cross-strait high-level talks	Chen Deming	Lin Join-sane	August 2015	(China) Fuzhou

== See also ==
- Cross-strait relations
- Wang–Koo summit
- 2014 Wang–Zhang meetings
- 2015 Ma–Xi meeting
