= 2005 visits by the Pan-Blue Coalition to mainland China =

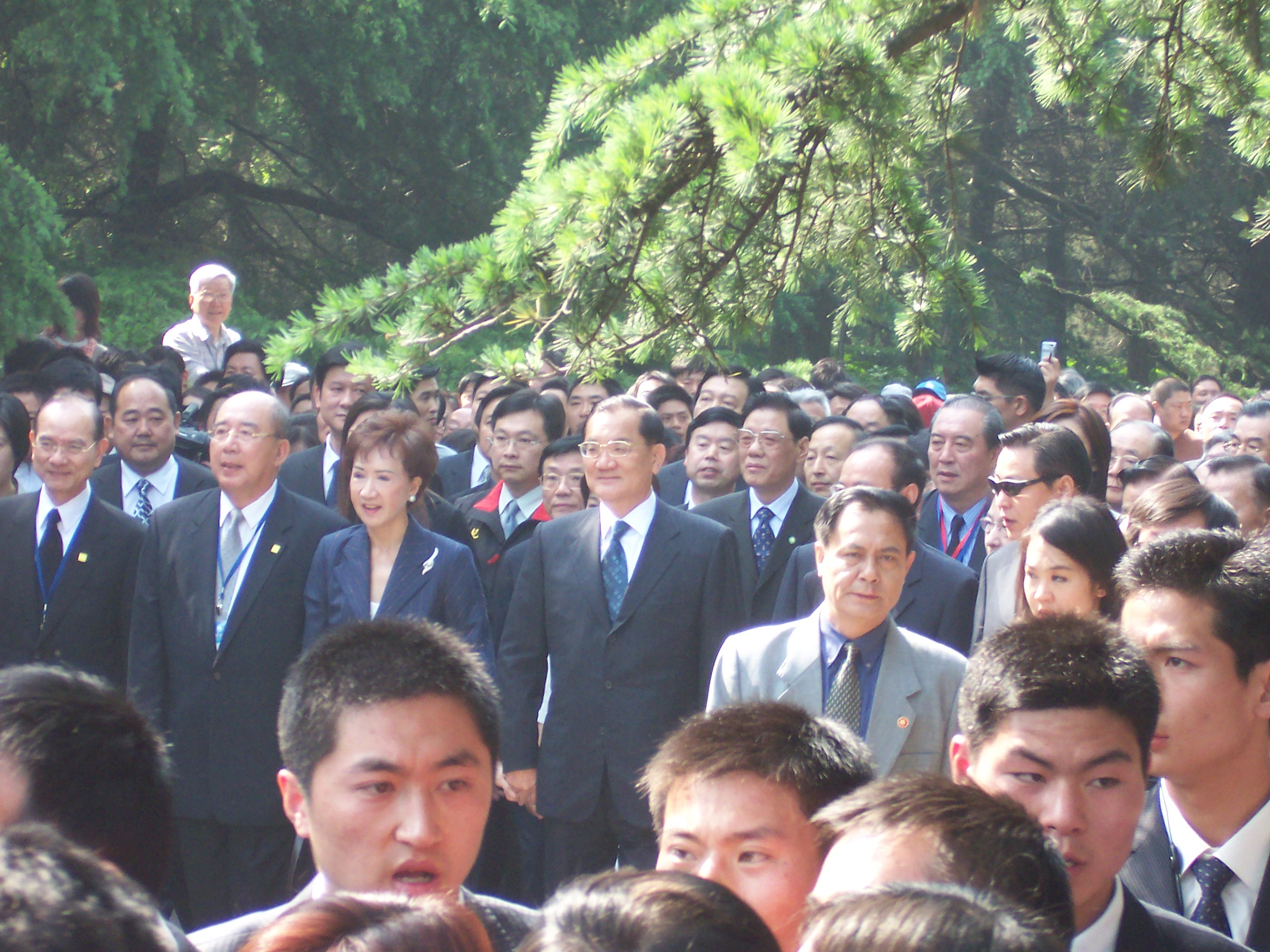
Lien Chan and the Kuomintang touring the Sun Yat-sen Mausoleum in Nanjing, People's Republic of China. The Pan-Blue coalition visited mainland China in 2005.

The 2005 Pan-Blue visits to mainland China were a series of visits by delegations of the Kuomintang (Note: The Chinese Nationalist Party governing the Republic of China) (KMT) and their allied Pan-Blue Coalition to mainland China. They were hailed as the highest level of exchange between the Chinese Communist Party and the Kuomintang since Chiang Kai-shek and Mao Zedong met in Chongqing, China on August 28, 1945.

On March 28, 2005, the Kuomintang's vice chairman Chiang Pin-kung led a delegation in the first official visit to mainland China by a senior leader of the Kuomintang in 60 years. Later, on April 26, 2005, a 70-member delegation led by the Kuomintang's chairman Lien Chan left Taipei for the ROC's de jure capital of Nanjing via Hong Kong, launching Lien's 8-day Taiwan Strait peace tour; also the first such visit to mainland China in 60 years.

While in mainland China, Lien met with General Secretary Hu Jintao and expressed interest in improving cross-strait dialogues. Both also re-affirmed a belief in the "One China principle", which was not acknowledged by Taiwan's then-ruling party, the Democratic Progressive Party (DPP), which had been a part of Taiwan's Pan-Green Coalition.

Lien's itinerary also included visits to Xi'an, where he had lived as a child during the Second Sino-Japanese War and World War II; Nanjing, the official capital of the Republic of China and the site of the Sun Yat-sen Mausoleum; and Shanghai, China's largest city and site of extensive Taiwanese financial and economic investment in recent years.

== Background ==
In 2004, the KMT first proposed that the former president candidate Lien Chan would visit mainland China as the elected President of the Republic of China, but this was set aside as Lien failed to win the 2004 ROC presidential election. In 2005, the KMT suggested initially sending the vice chairman of the party to mainland China, with further visits to follow. This plan was followed through on March 28, when Vice Chairman Chiang Pin-kung led his delegation to mainland China.

== Chiang's visit ==
As part of the "ice-breaking tour", Chiang started his trip in Guangzhou to visit the graves of dozens of KMT members who died during an uprising against the Qing dynasty in 1911. On the morning of March 30, the delegation visited the Sun Yat-sen Mausoleum in Nanjing, then headed for Beijing to meet with CPPCC chairman Jia Qinglin. At the meeting, Jia conveyed Hu Jintao's invitation for Lien to Chiang. On April 1, Lien accepted the invitation at the Aichi Expo 2005.

== Lien's visit ==
=== Chiang Kai-shek International Airport ===
Lien Chan and his 70-member delegation departed Taipei for Hong Kong on April 26, starting the 8-day "journey of peace" which the mainland Chinese media referred to as a "visit." The Chinese media changed the airport name from "Chiang Kai-Shek International Airport" to "Taoyuan airport" to avoid mentioning the name of former leader of KMT and the late President of the Republic of China, Chiang Kai-shek.

On that morning, about a thousand people gathered at the Chiang Kai-shek International Airport, and violent conflict broke out among the supporters and opponents of the tour, resulting in many injuries.

Some Pan-Green supporters illegally brought guandao, beer bottles, stones, eggs, firecrackers, clubs, and sharpened sugarcanes into the terminals and started beating Pan-Blue supporters and the police, throwing stones and setting off firecrackers in the meantime. Many members of the Democratic Progressive Party (DPP), the Taiwan Solidarity Union (TSU), and the Taiwan Independence Party were arrested, along with the host of a political talk show.

Pan-Blue supporters fought back, swearing "an eye for an eye". There were suspected Triad members clad in black in the mob, picking on Pan-Green's supporters, causing many to be hospitalized. The New Party chairman Yok Mu-ming was arrested, along with other people in the Pan-Blue Coalition.

Outside the airport, a few taxis attempted to blockade the highway, preventing Lien from reaching the airport, but they were repelled by the motorcade's police escort. Taiwan independence advocate Su Beng and pan-Green supporters lit firecrackers in front of the terminal, but were not arrested.

Lien avoided the trouble entirely having been taken into the airport via a VIP entrance.

Because the Aviation Police Office of Taiwan proved inept in handling the riot, its director, Chen Jui-tien was dismissed that evening. The Minister of the Interior, Su Jia-chyuan offered to resign, but the offer was rejected by Premier Frank Hsieh.

On the Internet, teenagers parodied the event with a mock Dynasty Warriors battle.

=== Nanjing ===
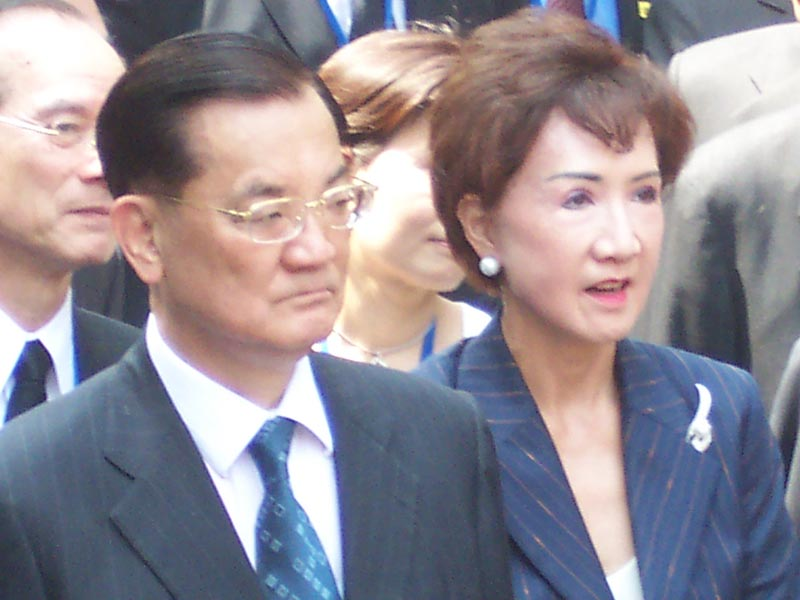
Lien Chan and his wife, Lien Fang Yu, in Nanjing

The delegation transferred onto China Eastern Airlines to Nanjing in Hong Kong, where they were greeted by the PRC Liaison Office of Hong Kong.

Lien and the delegation arrived at Nanjing Lukou International Airport on April 26, at 16:40. Taiwan Affairs Office of the State Council head Chen Yunlin was at the airport to welcome the delegation. One of Lien's aides, Joanna Lai, quipped "It would have taken just two and half hours from Taipei to Nanjing by direct flight, but we took 50-60 years." Lien echoed the sentiment in a short speech upon arrival, saying "Taipei and Nanjing are not too distant, but it still took 60 years to come here. It certainly took too long to make the journey." That night he attended a banquet hosted by the leader of the Jiangsu provincial government and lodged at the Jinling Hotel.

On April 27, the delegation visited the Sun Yat-sen Mausoleum, where Lien burnt incense for the former president surrounded by the general public and press reporters. Lien quoted Sun Yat-Sen's last words "peace, struggle, save China" to promote a healthy relationship across the strait. Lien was the first KMT chairman to visit the mausoleum for 56 years.

On the same day, Lien visited the Ming Xiaoling Mausoleum, the former Republic of China Presidential Palace, Tianfei Gong, and the Fuzi Miao (Shrine of Confucius).

On the morning of April 28, Lien left Nanjing for Beijing.

=== Beijing ===
In the afternoon of April 28, Lien and the delegation arrived in the Beijing Capital International Airport, where he delivered another speech. Then he attended a conference with the Taiwan Affairs Office in the Diaoyutai State Guesthouse. Later, the delegation visited the Forbidden City. Lien met the CPPCC Chairman Jia Qinglin at the Great Hall of the People, and then watched a traditional Beijing opera performance.

On April 29, Lien gave a speech and answered questions from students and faculty in Peking University. The speech called for a 'win-win' future of cooperation and peace, praising both Deng Xiaoping and Chiang Ching-kuo as having made pivotal decisions that led to economic growth.

In the speech, he also mentioned that both Hu Shih and former National Taiwan University president Fu Sinian had graduated from Peking University, then worked at Taiwan University and spread liberalism there. "Therefore, in terms of liberalism, both Peking University and Taiwan University are born from the same root. Especially in mainland China, it can be said that it's a bastion of freedom." But a proportion of Taiwanese students disagreed, saying both Hu and Fu were fierce opponents of communism in favor of freedom of education, and thus the two universities can't be compared, and protested outside the front gate.

Lien then toured the university, and visited the dormitory where his mother once lived. At 15:00, Lien met Hu Jintao in the Great Hall of the People, marking a historical meeting between the Chinese Communist Party and the Kuomintang, the first since 1945. After 17:30, Lien held a press conference, and listed the five points of compromise settled upon by the two parties following the conference:

1. On the premise of acknowledging the 1992 Consensus, encourage the reopening of talks across the strait;
2. Encourage an end to hostilities, and establish peace;
3. Encourage cooperation in economic exchange and crime fighting, push for two-way direct flights across the strait, Three Links, and agricultural exchange;
4. Encourage talks regarding increasing Taiwan's international role; and
5. Establish a platform of communication between the two parties.

That evening, Lien changed his plan for the night and met with Hu Jintao again. Reportedly, Hu Jintao invited Lien for a politics-free chat as it was Lien's last night in Beijing.

=== Xi'an ===
On April 30 at 11:25, the delegation arrived at Xi'an Xianyang International Airport, starting Lien's tour of his birthplace. Welcoming Lien were officials of the Shaanxi provincial government, Taiwanese businessmen in mainland China, and children from Lien's elementary school.

At 3 pm Lien returned to Houzaimen Elementary School (then called Beixinjie Elementary), which he had attended 60 years ago. There he gave a speech and watched several presentations by the schoolchildren, among them the soon-famous "Grandpa, You are back!" skit reminiscent of the Cultural Revolution. Lien later donated to the school library, and the school gave him a 7 m (23 ft) long wall scroll in return.

After visiting the school, the delegation visited the Terracotta Army. In the evening, Shaanxi provincial secretary Li Jianguo hosted a Tang dynasty-style banquet for the delegation in the Tang Paradise theme park. Li presented the delegation with prints from the Stele Forest and ancient copperware, Lien in return gave famous Taiwanese glasswork. Later, the delegation watched the musical "Dream Back to the Tang" in the Fengming Jiutian Theatre.

Lien and his family members visited his grandmother's grave in Xi'an on May 1, and burnt incense at the nearby Qingliang Temple.

=== Shanghai ===
At 5pm on May 1, Lien arrived at Shanghai Pudong International Airport.

The next day, Lien cancelled his trip atop the Oriental Pearl Tower and held a press conference at the Shanghai Shangri-la Hotel. He later visited Wang Daohan at Jinjiang Hotel. At nine he toured Xintiandi, and took a harbor cruise to view The Bund at night.

On May 3, 1pm, Lien and his delegation flew back to Taipei, via Hong Kong.

== Reactions ==
The state media in mainland China covered the visit in great detail and much of the general public welcomed this delegation with enthusiasm.

The United States declared public support for Lien's visit, stating "diplomacy is the only way to resolve the cross-strait issue." However, the US also stressed that it would like to see the Chinese Communist Party (CCP) have talks with Taiwan's current ruling party, as well as the KMT. Western political analysts have compared the handshake of Lien and Hu Jintao to that of Yitzhak Rabin and Yasser Arafat.

The European Union also welcomed the visit, stating they "hope it will prove to be the first positive step in the right direction."

In Taiwan, public opinion was split. Polls showed that more than half of the people supported this visit, the DPP argued that the People's Republic of China was attempting to play a divide-and-conquer game with Taiwan and causing a "widening schism" among the Taiwanese. Former ROC President and TSU affiliate Lee Teng-hui condemned the visits of Lien and Soong (see below), calling them sympathizers of mainland China who want to undermine Taiwan's sovereignty.

Republic of China (ROC) President Chen Shui-bian initially condemned Lien and said that his visit might be in violation of ROC law. However, several days later Chen Shui-bian reversed his opinions and showed a cautious goodwill gesture to Lien's visit. Chen has also altered his stance on Taiwan independence. While during the 2004 Taiwan election, Chen stressed his support for Taiwanese independence; he now says that "both independence and re-unification are options" for Taiwan's future. Political fallout from Lien's trip is believed to have contributed to this change in rhetoric.

== Aftermath ==
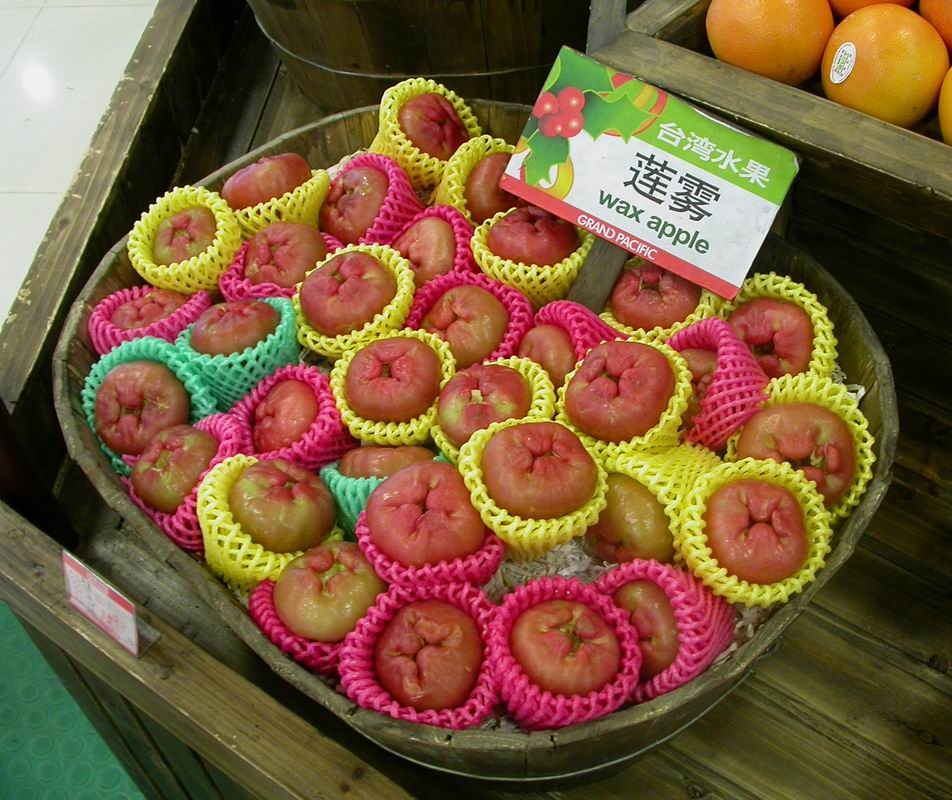
Taiwanese produce started to appear in Beijing's markets after Lien's visit to mainland China.

After Lien's visit, the PRC offered three "goodwill gifts" to the ROC: the normalization of tourism, which would allow direct flights across the Taiwan Strait; agricultural trade agreements that would increase sales of Taiwanese produce to mainland China; and two giant pandas for the Taipei Zoo. After much deliberation, authorities in Taiwan declined the final gift, saying that Taipei Zoo was not suited to the task of nurturing pandas. This decision was overturned following the election of Ma Ying-jeou to the presidency in March 2008.

James Soong, leader of the People First Party, followed Lien's visit on May 5 with a 9-day visit of his own. Like Lien, Soong also met with General Secretary Hu Jintao and expressed an interest in increasing cross-strait dialogue.

Prior to Soong's visit, President Chen extended an invitation to Hu Jintao to visit Taiwan so that he "can see with his own eyes that Taiwan is a sovereign nation." However, the CCP continues to show a lack of interest in dealing with Chen and the DPP.

== See also ==
- Pan-Blue Coalition
- Chinese Political Parties
- Political status of Taiwan
- History of the Republic of China
- Politics of the Republic of China
- Cross-Strait relations
- 2015 Ma–Xi meeting
