= 1025 rally to safeguard Taiwan =

Logo of the protest march

The 1025 demonstration (Chinese: 1025反黑心顧台灣大遊行; lit. 'October 25 Opposing Evil Minds and Looking out for Taiwan March') was a demonstration on 25 October 2008 sponsored by the Democratic Progressive Party (DPP) and Taiwan Solidarity Union in Taipei, Taiwan. This protest march was launched five months after the inauguration of President Ma Ying-jeou and was preceded by an earlier 30 August 2008 protest in August which focused on Ma's failing economic plans.

The protesters marched against the perceived pro-China policies of the Ma administration. An estimated half a million people were reported to have participated in the march. It was planned by the DPP in response to the Chinese tainted milk powder scandal and Taiwan's perceived growing ties with the People's Republic of China (PRC).

== Background ==
=== Cross-strait relations ===
The People's Republic of China claims that self-ruled Taiwan is its 23rd province. The PRC has threatened the use of force if Taiwan declares de jure independence from China.

Zhang Mingqing, the deputy chairman of the Association for Relations Across the Taiwan Strait, arrived in Taiwan about a week before the protest. When asked by reporters to comment on President Ma's remarks that there will be no war across the Taiwan Strait in the next four years, Zhang expressed that there will never be war in the Strait if there is no Taiwan independence.

During a private visit to the Taiwan Confucian Temple in Tainan, Zhang fell to the ground as he encounters a small number of protesters led by the DPP's Tainan City legislator Wang Ting-yu. It was not clear whether he tripped or was pushed down, but Zhang was hurt. The car that Zhang was in was attacked and damaged when a protester jumped on the top of the car. Later, Zhang remarked, "Those who commit violence do not get what they want, but instead drop a rock on their own feet." as well as "A handful of compatriots in Tainan were involved in the violence (against me). They do not reflect the true feelings of the vast majority of compatriots in Tainan, nor the 23 million people of Taiwan."

=== Tainted products ===
The safety of Chinese food products has become a major issue in Taiwan. The Ma administration's policy of normalising cross-strait relations has been perceived by the pro-independence supporters as forming closer ties with the PRC. The milk scandal became not only a public health issue, but a political one as well. The government's ability to address the issue was questioned by the general public and the media. The Department of Health was heavily criticized by the Consumers' Foundation and investigated by the Control Yuan.

Other than condemning the PRC, DPP demanded that President Ma should request compensation from the PRC. DPP chairwoman Tsai Ing-wen also criticized the government for being "weak" toward the PRC. Some Kuomintang legislators, on the other hand, criticized the PRC government for notifying Taiwan late after the news had already been reported by Taiwanese media.

== Organization ==
=== Parade routes ===
- "Oppose Toxic Goods" (approx. 3.9 km)
- "Oppose One China Education" (approx. 3.4 km)
- "Oppose the Hollowing Out of Sovereignty" (approx. 3.8 km)
- "Oppose a One China Market" (approx. 4.2 km)
- "Oppose the Incompetent Government" (approx. 4.8 km)

The planned starting point of the first route "Oppose Toxic Goods" was the Dinghao Plaza. Some of the politicians who took this route were former President Chen Shui-bian, former president of the World United Formosans for Independence Peng Ming-min and current president Ng Chiau-tong, and former foreign minister Chen Tang-shan.

The participants of the "Oppose One China Education" route started out in front of the main gate of the National Taiwan University. Protesters are mostly students who resisted the government's policy to recognize mainland Chinese academic qualifications. Leaders of this group include DPP chairwoman Tsai Ing-wen, former Kaohsiung mayor Yeh Chu-lan, current mayor Chen Chu, and Kaohsiung County magistrate Yang Chiu-hsing.

The third route was organized by the TSU. Protesters marched from the Lungshan Temple. The TSU convened about 20,000 people including members of Victims of Investment in China Association. The participants protested against Ma's perceived policy of "damaging Taiwan's sovereignty".

The fourth route was led by former premier Yu Shyi-kun, who was accompanied by Yunlin County magistrate Su Chih-fen, deputy magistrate Lee Ying-yuan, Tainan County magistrate Su Huan-chih, and Tainan mayor Hsu Tain-tsair. Protesters held a banner with slogan "Love Yunlin, Rebut Chen Yunlin!" The last route "Oppose the Incompetent Government" was led by former DPP chairman Su Tseng-chang. Protesters T-shirts with slogans such as "Defend Taiwan" and "I am Taiwanese, not Chinese."

== Demonstration ==
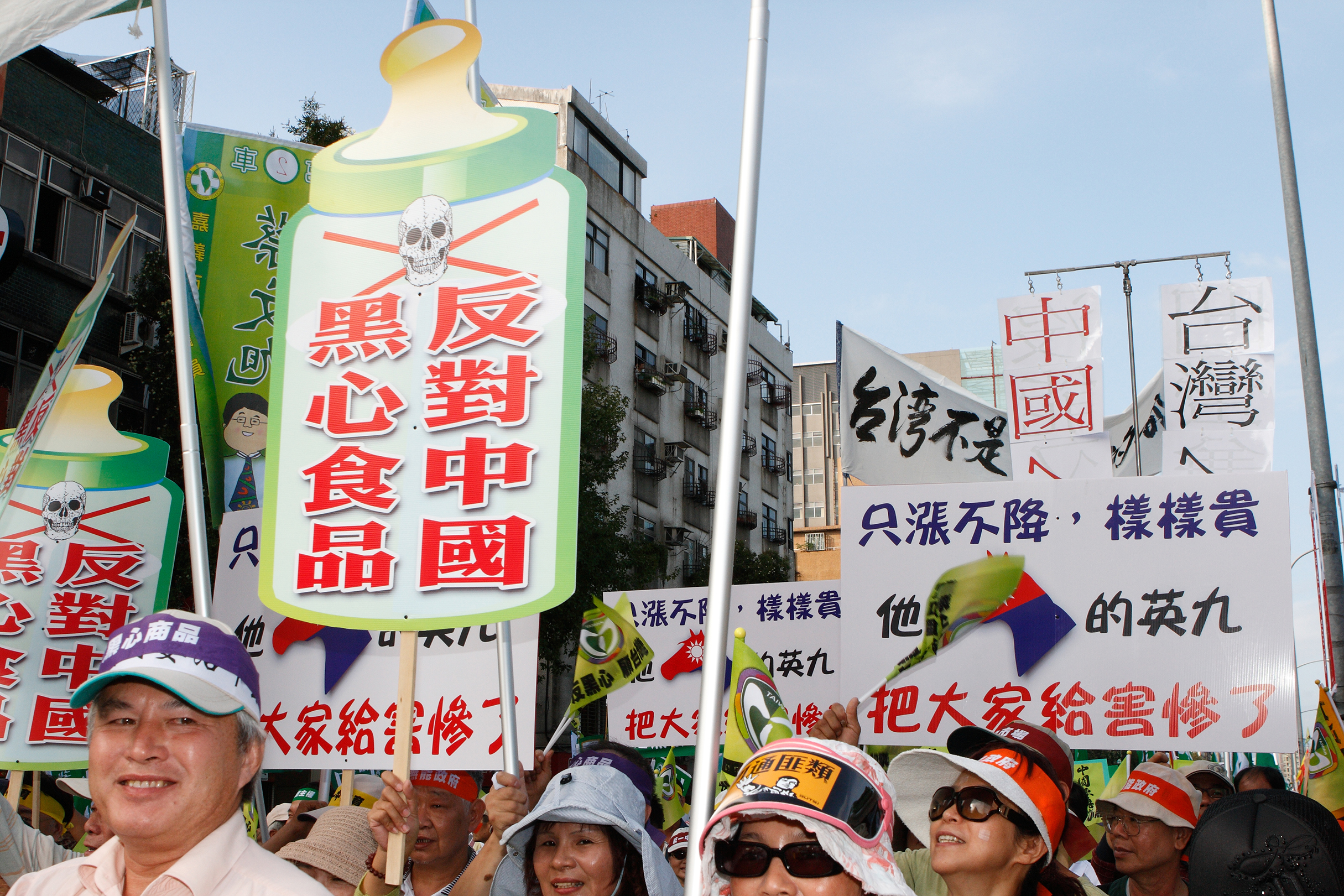
Protesters holding signs with slogan "Oppose Chinese toxic food"

Because the protest march was launched primarily by the Democratic Progressive Party, participants were predominantly pan-green. Former DPP chairmen Yao Chia-wen, Su Tseng-chang, and Yu Shyi-kun all participated in the march.

Despite recent corruption controversies, former President Chen Shui-bian also marched and took the "Oppose Toxic Goods" route, although he did not finish the route. This was Chen's last appearance at a public political event before his arrest on November 11. The DPP organizers announced that there were over 600,000 protesters.

According to the pro-independence Taiwan East Society (Chinese: 台灣東社), there were some pan-blue or Kuomintang supporters who signed up for the event. The chairman of the organization said that President Ma's pro-China policies had irritated many Taitung residents.

=== Controversial officer ===
When protesters asked a police officer whether her boss is President Ma or not, the officer, surnamed Chou, responded that she worked for the People's Republic of China (PRC). The response irritated pan-green supporters, and an apology was immediately demanded. Chou apologized and left the scene.

The director of the National Police Agency Wang Cho-chiun later publicly apologized for the conduct of the officer, saying she has "damaged the police's public image." Wang also said that the officer will be punished for sure.

== Responses ==
President Ma Ying-jeou said he would listen to the voice of the people and respond to their criticism, but maintained that the main direction of his government policies remained the correct one.

== See also ==
- 517 Protest
