= Wang–Koo summit =

High-level meeting between Chinese and Taiwanese leaders.

Wang–Koo talks
- Traditional Chinese: 汪辜會談
- Simplified Chinese: 汪辜会谈
Transcriptions
Standard Mandarin
- Hanyu Pinyin: Wāng–Gū huìtán
Hakka
- Romanization: Vong^{24}–Gu^{24} fi^{55}-tam^{11}
Southern Min
- Hokkien POJ: Ong–Koo huē‑tâm

Koo–Wang talks
- Traditional Chinese: 辜汪會談
- Simplified Chinese: 辜汪会谈
Transcriptions
Standard Mandarin
- Hanyu Pinyin: Gū–Wāng huìtán
Hakka
- Romanization: Gu^{24}–Vong^{24} fi^{55}-tam^{11}
Southern Min
- Hokkien POJ: Koo–Ong huē‑tâm

The Wang–Koo summit, alternatively the Koo–Wang talks, was an attempt at a cross-strait meeting that took place in 1993 with some follow up meetings up to 1998 between Association for Relations Across the Taiwan Straits (ARATS) chairman Wang Daohan and Straits Exchange Foundation (SEF) chairman Koo Chen-fu.

== Pre-meeting ==
In 1992, a year before the Wang–Koo summit in Hong Kong, semiofficial meetings were held between the People's Republic of China (PRC) and the Republic of China (ROC). The PRC and the ROC claim that this allowed either side to interpret their own version of "One China" through the 1992 Consensus. Critics have also pointed out that the term was not created contemporaneously within the timeframe of the meeting: the term was coined in April 2000 by former National Security Council secretary-general Su Chi, eight years after the 1992 meetings,

== Meeting ==
From April 27–29, 1993 the Wang–Koo summit meeting took place in Singapore. It was the first public meeting between figures of non-governmental organization (NGO) since 1949. Four agreements were signed to promote trade and people-to-people exchanges. After the meeting, 20 more consultations at different levels were held.

Around the time of the 1996 ROC presidential election, the mainland's People's Liberation Army fired ballistic missiles during the Third Taiwan Strait Crisis.

In 1998 Wang and Koo met again in Shanghai. A year later, the two sides would suspend talks in 1999 after the then President of the Republic of China and Kuomintang chairman Lee Teng-hui proposed the Special state-to-state relations. There would be no meetings for nine years until the 2008 First Chen-Chiang summit.
