= Fourth Chen–Chiang summit =

Diplomacy

The Fourth Chen–Chiang summit (Chinese: 第四次陳江會談) was part of a series of the Chen-Chiang summit of cross-strait meetings held at Taichung, Taiwan. It was a meeting between the Association for Relations Across the Taiwan Straits (ARATS) and Straits Exchange Foundation (SEF).

== Pre-meeting protest ==
Tens of thousands of opposition demonstrators marched through Taichung on December 20, 2009. Police put Sunday's crowd in Taichung at 20,000-30,000. Some 500 officers were on hand to control the protesters.

== Meeting ==
Representing mainland China's ARATs, Chen Yun-lin arrives in Taichung, Taiwan on December 21, 2009, for a 4-day trip to Christmas day December 25. Both sides signed three agreements on agricultural, inspection and cooperations on quarantine, testing and certifications. The double taxation was not signed.

Supporters of Taiwan Independence expressed their opposition against China's denial of Taiwanese sovereignty, military threats and Economic Cooperation Framework Agreement.

== Injuries ==
One police officer was injured and six people were arrested after the officer fell from a truck as he tried to stop protesters from shooting fireworks at the hotel where Chen Yun-lin was staying. The police was pushed by members of the 908 Taiwan Republic Campaign.
