= Zhang Zhijun =

Chinese politician and diplomat

- 张志军
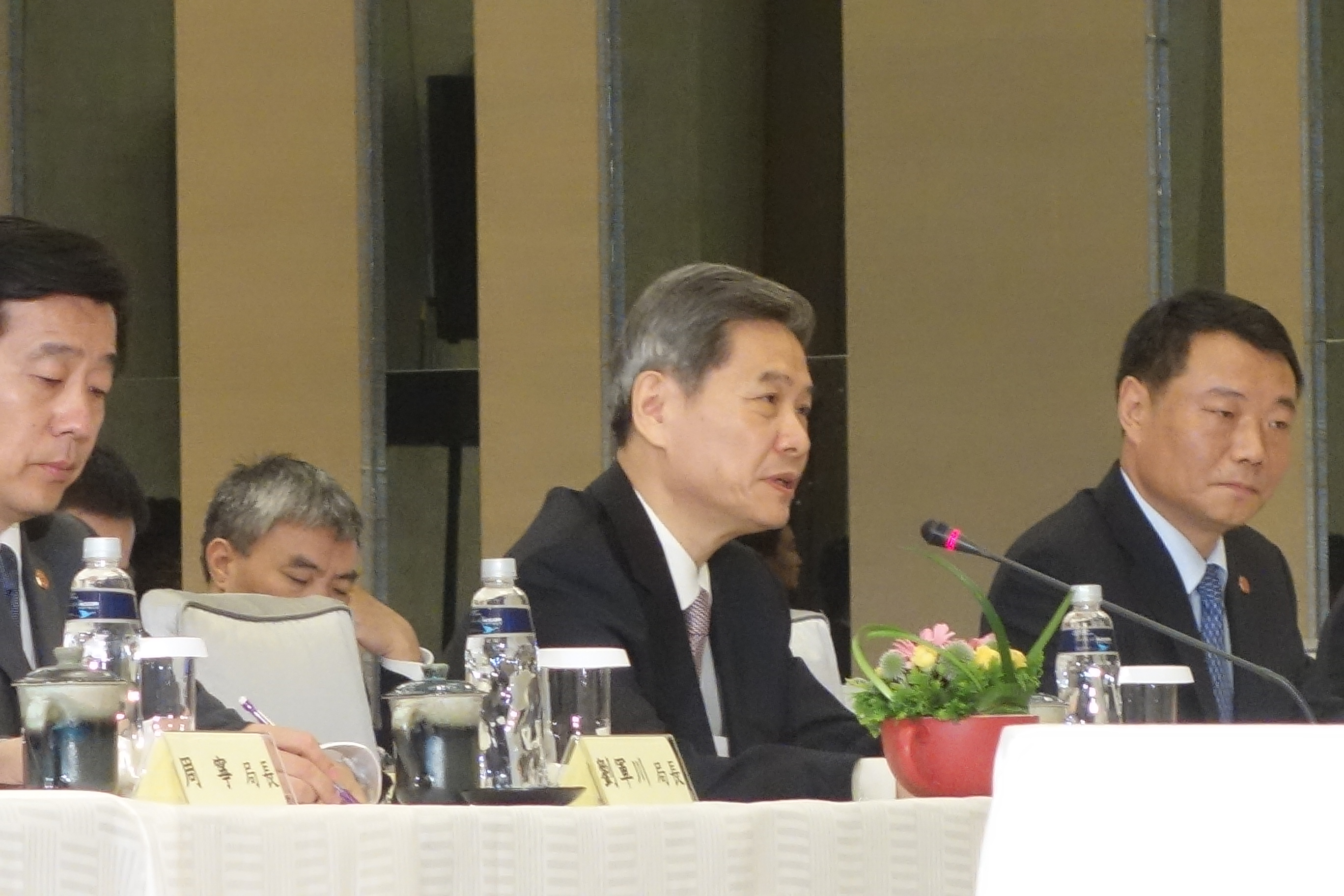
- In 2014

President of Association for Relations Across the Taiwan Straits
- Incumbent
- Assumed office 27 April 2018
- Preceded by: Chen Deming

Director of the Taiwan Affairs Office
- In office 17 March 2013 – 19 March 2018
- Premier: Li Keqiang
- Deputy: Zheng Lizhong, Sun Yafu, Ye Kedong, Chen Yuanfeng
- Preceded by: Wang Yi
- Succeeded by: Liu Jieyi

Vice Minister of Foreign Affairs
- In office 2009 – 16 March 2013
- Minister: Yang Jiechi

Personal details
- Born: 1 February 1953 (age 73) Nantong, Jiangsu, China
- Party: Chinese Communist Party
- Education: Peking University

Zhang Zhijun (Chinese: 张志军; pinyin: Zhāng Zhìjūn; born 1 February 1953) is a Chinese diplomat and politician. From 17 March 2013 to 21 March 2018, he has served as the Minister of the Taiwan Affairs Office of the State Council. He is currently the president of the Association for Relations Across the Taiwan Straits since April 2018.

== Education ==
Zhang studied at Peking University in 1971. He also went overseas to the United Kingdom for student exchange.

== Taiwan Affairs Office ==
=== 11th Cross-Strait Relations Symposium ===
In March 2013, speaking at the 11th Cross-Strait Relations Symposium in Pingtan, Fujian, Zhang called for increased quality and efficiency of cross-strait exchanges and cooperation. The symposium was attended by people from both sides, including some from Taiwan's Democratic Progressive Party. He wished to visit Taiwan as well as to meet his counterpart, Wang Yu-chi, the head of the Mainland Affairs Council.

=== Zhang-Wang meeting ===
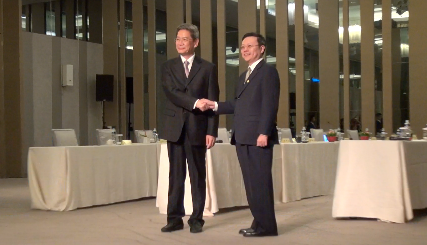
Zhang Zhijun visit to Taiwan to meet with Wang Yu-chi

On 11 February 2014, Zhang met with Wang Yu-chi in Nanjing, the first high-level government-to-government official contact between the two sides since the end of the Chinese Civil War in 1949. The meeting took place at the Purple Palace hotel in Nanjing. Upon meeting with Wang, both of them agreed to establish a direct and regular communication channel between the two sides for future engagement under the 1992 Consensus. They also agreed on finding a solution for health insurance coverage aiming towards Taiwanese students studying in the mainland, on pragmatically establishing SEF and ARATS offices in each other's territory and on studying the feasibility of allowing visits to detained persons once offices have been established.

Before both of them shook hands, Zhang referred to Wang as "Minister Wang Yu-chi" without mentioning the name Mainland Affairs Council and Wang referred Zhang as "TAO Director Zhang Zhijun". However, mainland China's Xinhua News Agency referred to Wang as the "Responsible Official of Taiwan's Mainland Affairs Council" (Chinese: 台湾方面大陆委员会负责人; pinyin: Táiwān Fāngmiàn Dàlù Wěiyuánhuì Fùzé Rén) in its Chinese-language news or as the "Taiwan's Mainland Affairs Chief" in its English-language news.

On 25–28 June 2014, Zhang paid an official visit to Taiwan.

=== Xi-Ma meeting ===
Regarding the meeting between the head of both sides of the Taiwan Strait by Ma Ying-jeou and Xi Jinping, Zhang said that a meeting between family members can take place anywhere during any occasion. It needs not take place at any international or multilateral event. He further added that any such meeting can even occur in mainland China, Taiwan or any third location. On Saturday, 7 November 2015, Xi met Ma in Singapore during Xi's state visit to Singapore.

== See also ==
- Cross-Strait relations
- Mainland Affairs Council
