= Caisson (Asian architecture) =

Architectural feature

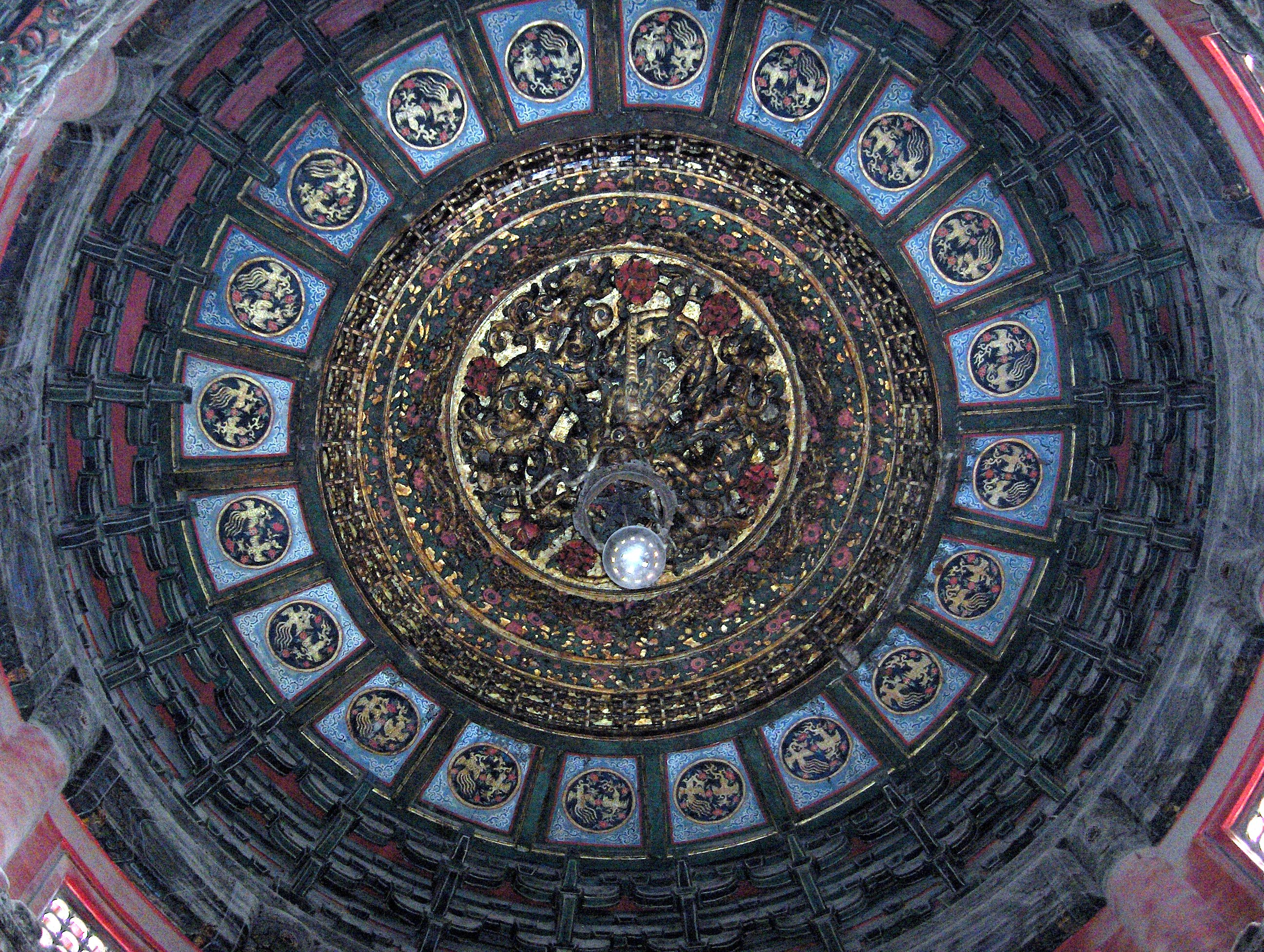
A round caisson in the imperial garden at the Forbidden City

The caisson (Chinese: 藻井; pinyin: zǎojǐng; lit. 'water plant well'), also referred to as a caisson ceiling, or spider web ceiling, in Chinese architecture is an architectural feature typically found in the ceiling of temples and palaces, usually at the centre and directly above the main throne, seat, or religious figure. The caisson is generally a sunken panel set into the ceiling. It is often layered and richly decorated. Common shapes include squares, octagons, hexagons, circles, and a combination of these.

== Name ==
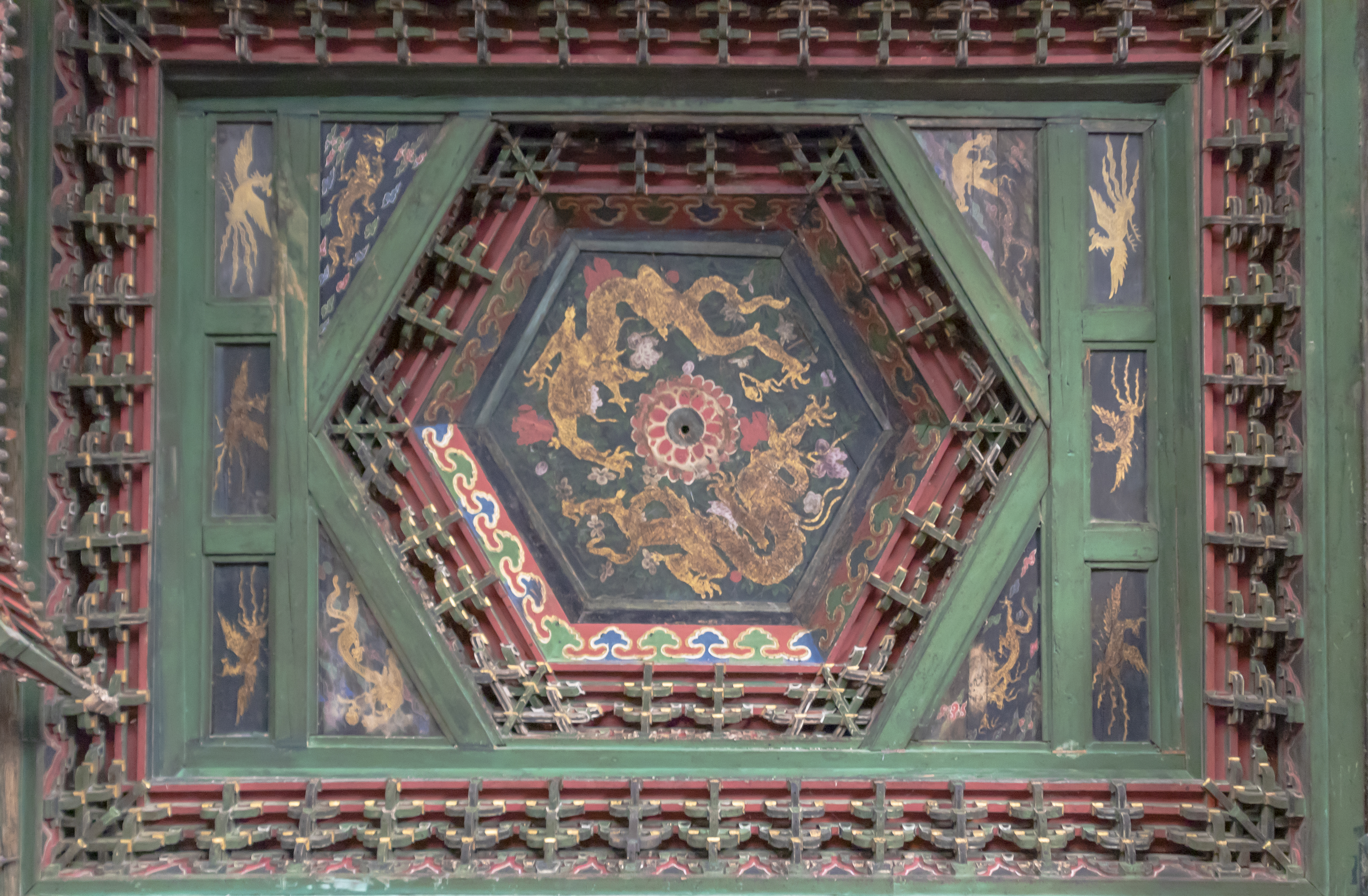
Jin dynasty caisson at Jingtu Temple of Shanxi.

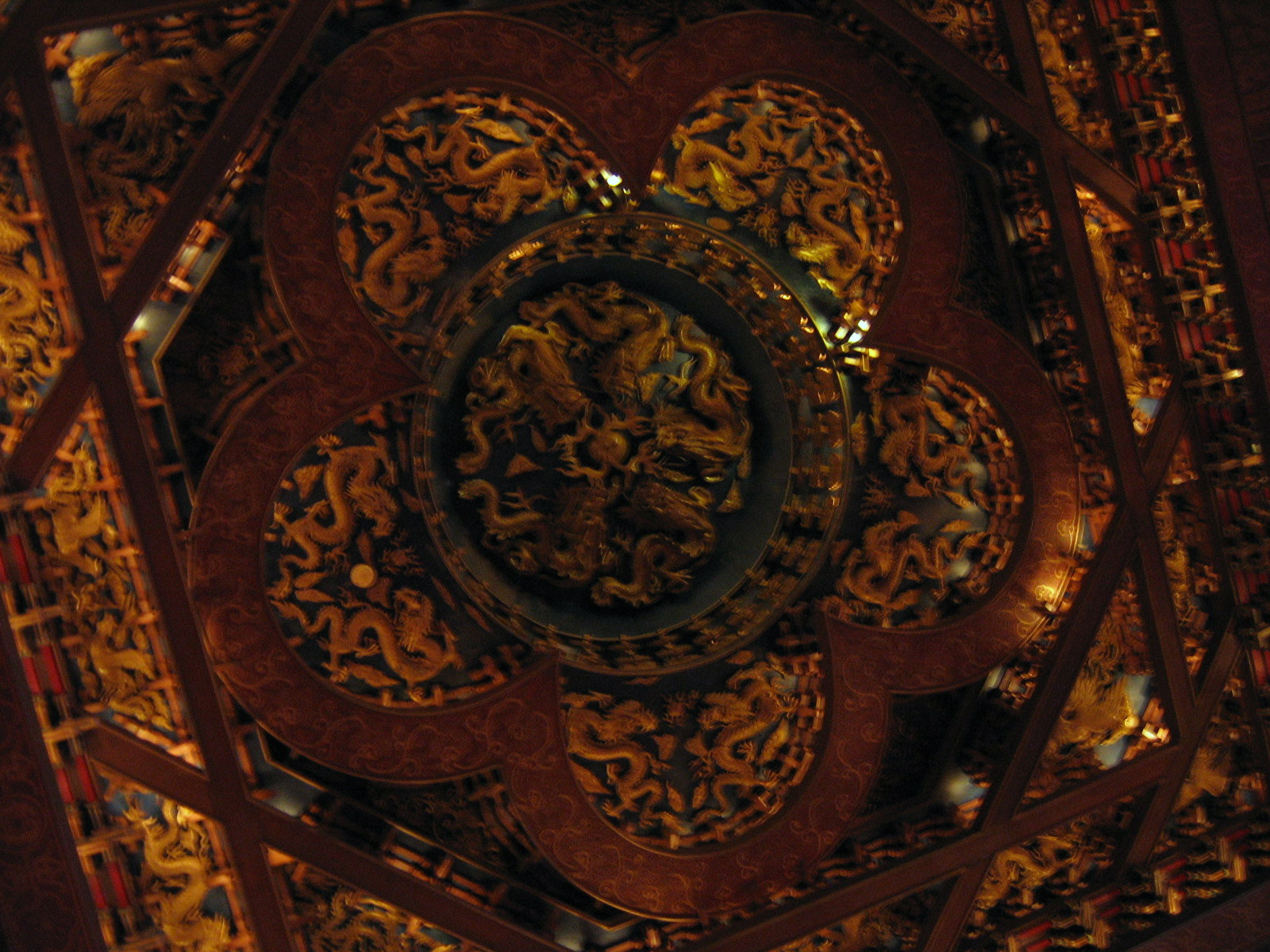
A modern caisson in traditional style, in the Grand Hotel, Taipei

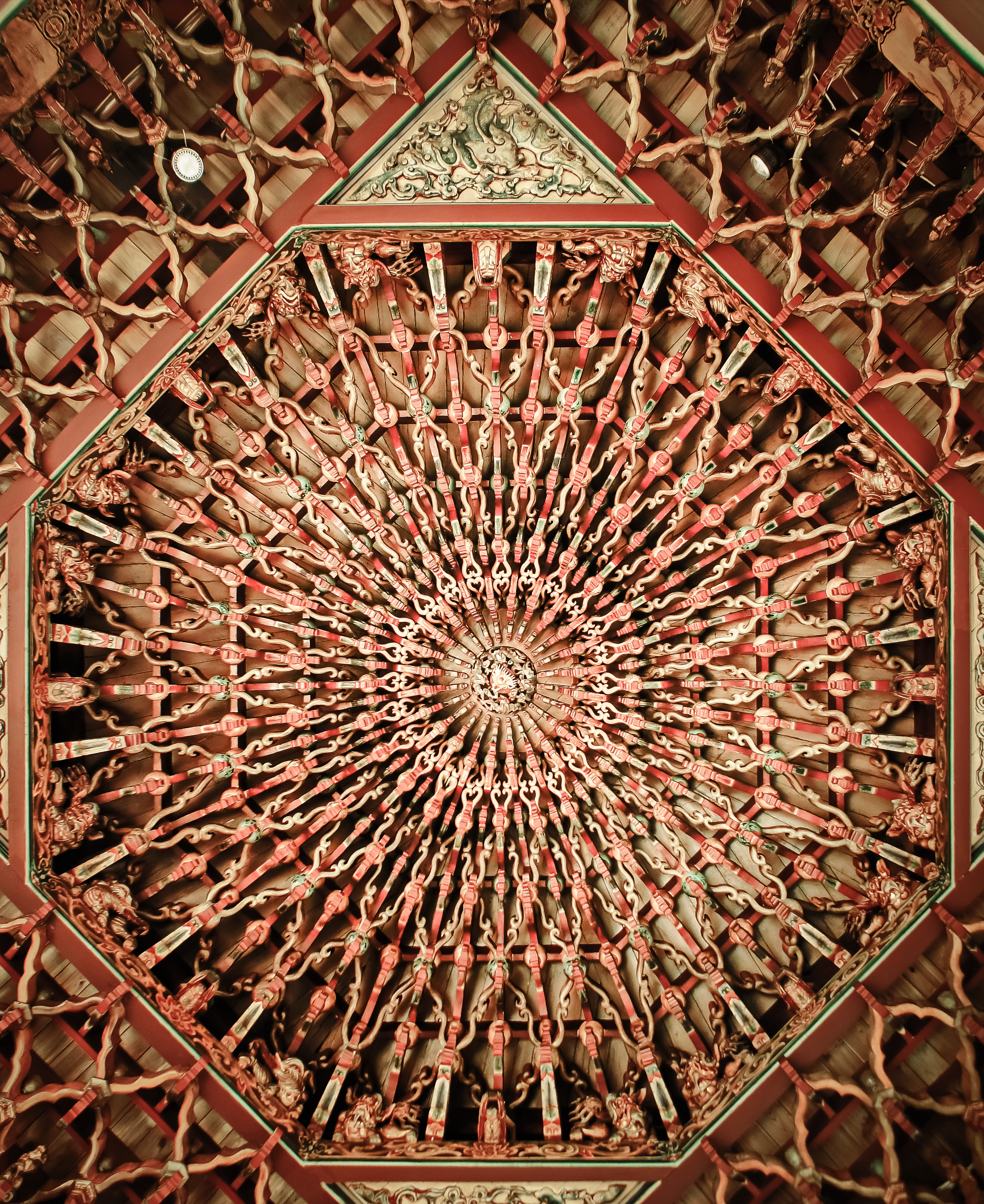
Caisson of the Worship Shrine, Qing-An-Gong, Shanhua District, Tainan City, Taiwan.

The caisson is a general name for a coffer. In the case of Chinese architecture, however, the caisson is characterised by highly developed conventions as to its structure and placement.

== Structure ==
The caisson is a sunken panel placed in the centre of the ceiling. It is raised above the level of the ceiling through the use of the dougong structure, which creates successive levels of diminishing size by interlocking structural members, as beams were not used. Beams may also be used to create a hexagonal or octagonal caisson surrounded by a square border. These beams, and the dougong members, are usually visible, richly carved, and often painted with deities.

The centre of the caisson is decorated with a large bas-relief carving or painting. Common themes include "two dragons chasing the pearl". Caissons in the throne rooms of the Forbidden City feature a large, writhing dragon, from whose mouth issue a chandelier-like structure called the Yellow Emperor Mirror, a series of metal balls which are said to be able to show reflections of evil spirits.

Caissons were originally used to support skylights. Therefore, they are a relatively recent structure in Chinese architectural history.

== Use in other structures ==
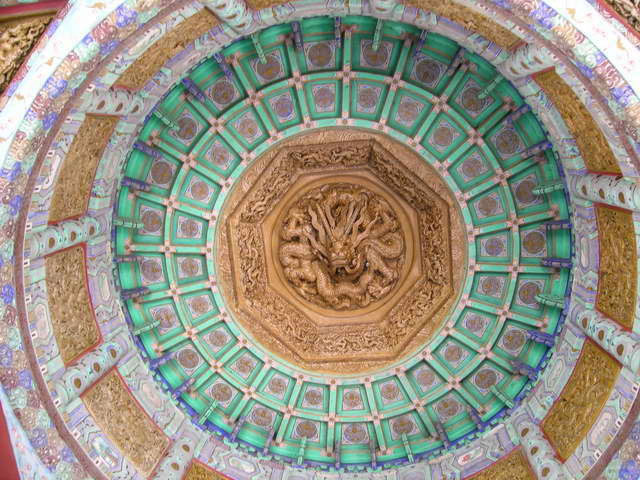
The caisson of the Five Dragons Pavilion at the Beihai Park.

The caisson has been found in tombs of the Han dynasty dating the use of this architectural feature back at least 2,000 years. Besides subterranean structure, the oldest existent caisson in an above-ground structure is the one located above the 16-metre-tall (52 ft) statue of Guanyin in the Guanyin Pavilion of Dule Monastery, Jixian, Hebei province, built in 984 during the Liao dynasty. Without the use of interior columns, this ceiling is held up by a hidden second-floor four-sided frame with a hexagonal ceiling frame on the third floor.

In traditional Chinese architecture, every facet of a building was decorated using various materials and techniques. Simple ceiling ornamentations in ordinary buildings were made of wooden strips and covered with paper. More decorative was the lattice ceiling, constructed of woven wooden strips or sorghum stems fastened to the beams. The most decorative and the most complex ceiling was the caisson.

Sanqing Hall (Hall of the Three Purities) is a Yuan period structure with three zaojing in its ceiling. A zaojing is a wooden dome over an imperial throne or statue in Chinese architecture.

As the caisson became increasingly standard in formal architecture in ancient China, similar structures also appeared in Buddhist grottoes, such as in Dunhuang.

== See also ==
- Chinese architecture
- Forbidden City
