= Hung Chi-chang =

Taiwanese physician and politician (born 1951)

- 洪奇昌
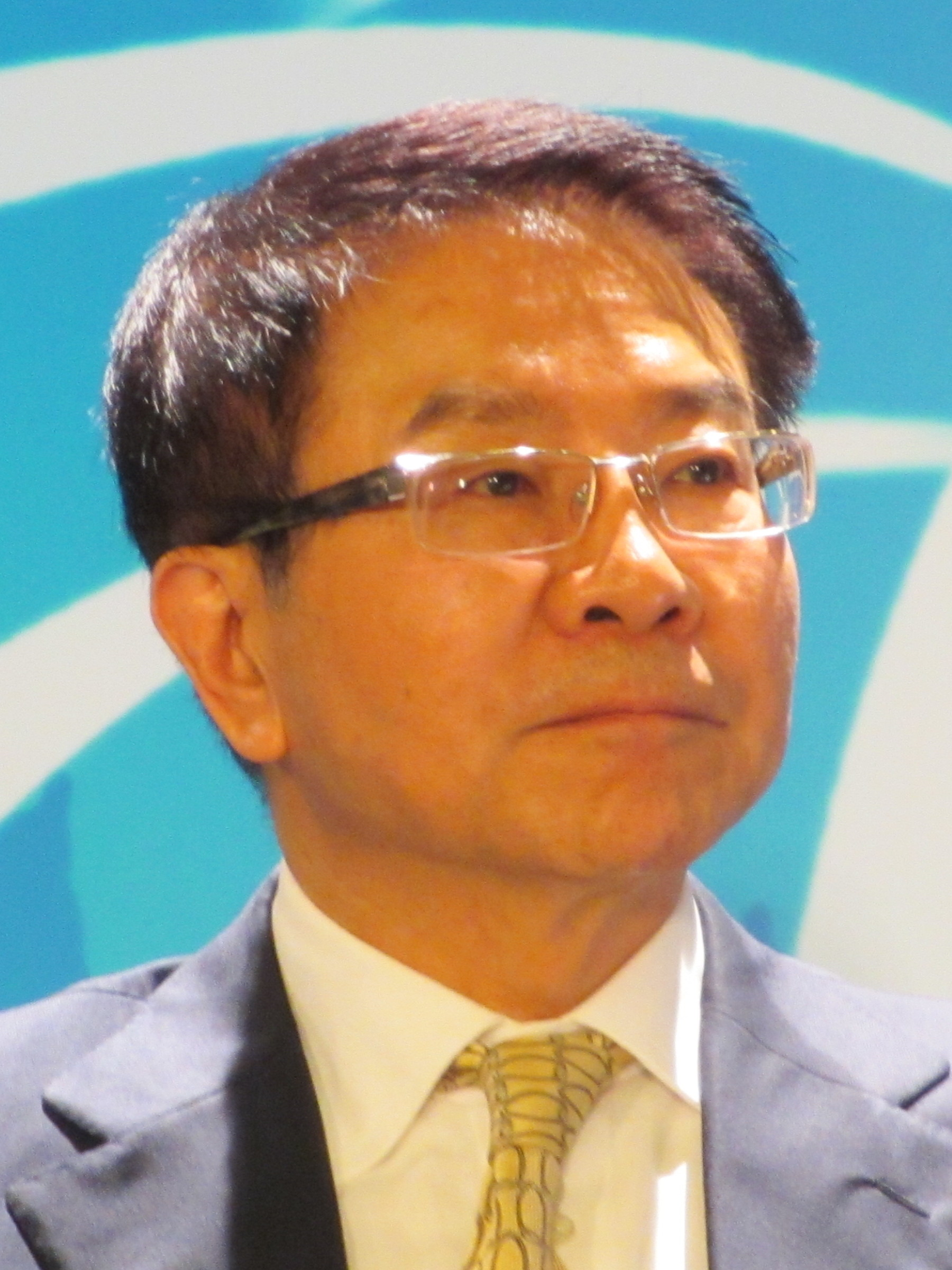

Chairman of the Straits Exchange Foundation
- In office 12 July 2007 – 19 May 2008
- Preceded by: Chang Chun-hsiung
- Succeeded by: Chiang Pin-kung

Member of the Legislative Yuan
- In office 1 February 1990 – 31 January 2008

Personal details
- Born: 23 August 1951 (age 74) Changhua County, Taiwan
- Party: Democratic Progressive Party
- Education: Taipei Medical University (MD); National Taiwan University (MS); University of Toronto (MSc)

Hung Chi-chang (Chinese: 洪奇昌; pinyin: Hóng Qíchāng; born 23 August 1951) is a Taiwanese physician and politician. He was the Chairman of the Straits Exchange Foundation (SEF) from 12 July 2007 to 19 May 2008.

== Education ==
After graduating from Taipei Medical University (previously Taipei Medical College), Hung earned a Master of Science in medical science from the Graduate School of Public Health of National Taiwan University. He then obtained another master's degree in medical science from the University of Toronto in Canada.

== Political career ==
In September 1986, Hung and seventeen others founded the Democratic Progressive Party.

=== Legislative Yuan ===
Hung had served in the Legislative Yuan since 1990.

Hung sought to be reelected to the legislature via the Democratic Progressive Party list in 2008, but failed to win a seat.

=== Straits Exchange Foundation ===
During a provisional meeting on 12 July 2007, the board of directors and supervisors of the SEF elected Hung to be the chairman of the foundation. Hung asserted that upon his election, SEF would step up its services for Taiwanese businesses and people on both sides of the Taiwan Strait in the future. His appointment met with some oppositions from Taiwan independence advocates due to his support for a proposal to lift the 40% investment ceiling of book value for investments by Taiwan's enterprises in mainland China.
