= Zhang Mingqing =

Chinese politician

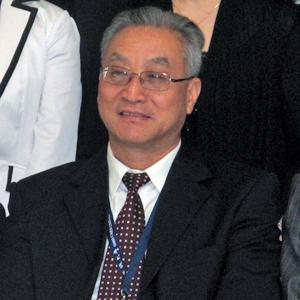
Zhang Mingqing

Zhang Mingqing (simplified Chinese: 张铭清; traditional Chinese: 張銘清; pinyin: Zhāng Míngqīng) is, as of 2008, the vice chairperson of the Association for Relations Across the Taiwan Straits (ARATS).

On a visit to Taiwan in October 2008, Zhang was attacked by pro-independence protesters in Tainan. There was a scuffle during which he was pushed to the ground. The assault was filmed and broadcast on Taiwanese television. Official Chinese news agency Xinhua expressed its "strong indignation". Taiwan's presidential office in turn expressed regrets over the incident; both sides condemned the violence.
