= Wang Daohan =

Chinese politician (1915–2005)

- 汪道涵
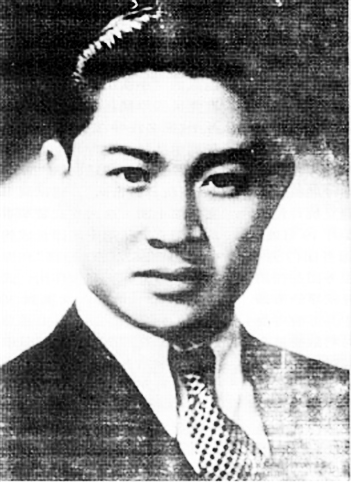

President of Association for Relations Across the Taiwan Strait
- In office 16 December 1991 – 24 December 2005
- Premier: Li Peng; Zhu Rongji; Wen Jiabao
- Succeeded by: Vacant, Chen Yunlin (2008)

Mayor of Shanghai
- In office April 1981 – July 1985
- Preceded by: Peng Chong
- Succeeded by: Jiang Zemin

Personal details
- Born: 27 March 1915 Jiashan County, Anhui, Republic of China
- Died: 24 December 2005 (aged 90) Shanghai, China
- Party: Chinese Communist Party

Wang Daohan (Chinese: 汪道涵; pinyin: Wāng Dàohán; 27 March 1915 – 24 December 2005) was a Chinese politician who served as Mayor of Shanghai from 1981 to 1985, and as president of the Association for Relations Across the Taiwan Straits (ARATS) from 1991 to 2005.

== Early life and education ==
Wang Daohan was born in Anhui in 1915 to Wang Yuxiang. He enrolled into Jiao Tong University as a science student in 1939.

== Career ==
Wang joined the Chinese Communist Party in 1938. Jiang Shangqing, the uncle and foster father of Jiang Zemin, was an associate of Wang before his death in 1939. Wang sponsored Jiang's attendance at the National Central University starting in 1943.

As Minister of the East China Industry Department from 1949 to 1952, Wang oversaw industrial buildup in Anhui, Shanghai, and Hangzhou. In the 1950s Wang served as First Minister of Machine Building. He served as deputy minister of the State Commission for Foreign Economic Relations with Foreign Countries from 1965 to 1979. He was vice chair of the State Foreign Investment Commission from 1979 to 1980.

=== Mayor ===
Wang was appointed vice-mayor of Shanghai in 1980. Wang served as mayor of Shanghai from 1981 to 1985. Jiang succeeded him as mayor.

Wang participated in a delegation of Chinese mayors to the United States from 7–26 July 1990 that visited 11 cities; Daohan and Zhu Rongji stayed in the United States for longer and visited an additional two cities.

=== ARATS ===
Wang was appointed president of the Association for Relations Across the Taiwan Straits (ARATS) in 1991. He met with Koo Chen-fu, chair of the Straits Exchange Foundation in 1993 and 1998.

== Personal life ==
Wang was an economics professor at Peking University, Fudan University, and Tongji University. He died in Shanghai on 24 December 2005.

== Works cited ==
=== Books ===
- Fang, Qiang; Li, Xiaobing, eds. (2024). China under Xi Jinping: A New Assessment. Leiden University Press. ISBN 9789087284411.
- Hass, Ryan; Glaser, Bonnie; Bush, Richard (2023). U.S.-Taiwan Relations: Will China's Challenge Lead to a Crisis?. Brookings Institution. ISBN 9780815740346.
- Lampton, David (2001). Same Bed, Different Dreams: Managing U.S.- China Relations, 1989-2000. University of California Press. ISBN 0520215907.
- Zhu, Rongji (2018). Zhu Rongji on the Record: The Shanghai Years, 1987-1991. Brookings Institution. ISBN 9780815731405.

=== News ===
- "Hundreds bid final farewell to China's Wang Daohan". Taipei Times. 31 December 2005. Archived from the original on 14 November 2026.
- "Wang Daohan, 90; Led Chinese Agency in Talks With Taiwan". Los Angeles Times. 26 December 2005. Archived from the original on 14 November 2026.
- "Who's Who". CNN. 1999. Archived from the original on 14 November 2026.

=== Web ===
- "Wang Daohan". University of Hong Kong. Archived from the original on 14 November 2026.
- "Economic Policy after the 16th Party Congress"
- Same Bed, Different Dreams
- AsiaWeek "Who's Who"

Political offices
Preceded by Peng Chong	Mayor of Shanghai; 1981–1984	Succeeded by Jiang Zemin
New title	President of Association for Relations Across the Taiwan Straits; 1991–2005	Succeeded by Chen Yunlin
