= Grand Hotel (Taipei) =

Hotel in Zhongshan, Taipei, Taiwan

Coordinates: 25°4.640′N 121°31.547′E

Grand Hotel 圓山大飯店
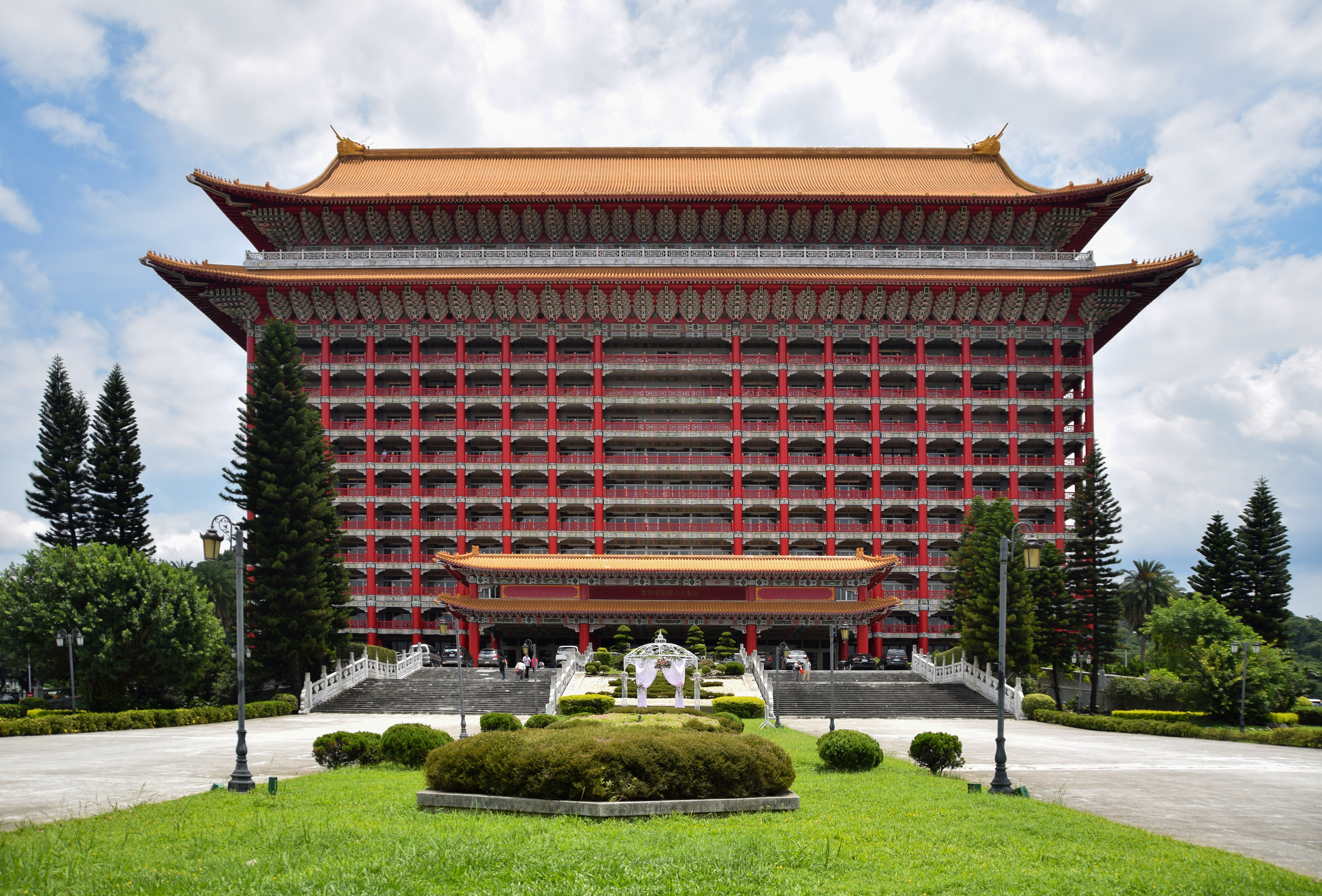

General information
- Location: 1, Chung Shan N.Rd., Sec.4, Zhongshan, Taiwan
- Opening: May, 1952 (main building: October 10, 1973)
- Owner: Ministry of Transportation and Communications
- Operator: Taiwan Friendship Foundation (Duen-Mou Foundation)

Technical details
- Floor count: 12 (main building)

Design and construction
- Architect: Yang Cho-cheng
- Developer: Continental Engineering Corporation

Other information
- Number of rooms: 490 (total)
- Number of restaurants: 3

Website
- http://www.grand-hotel.org/

The Grand Hotel (Chinese: 圓山大飯店; pinyin: Yuánshān Dà Fàndiàn; lit. 'Yuanshan Great Hotel') is a landmark located at Yuanshan (圓山) in Zhongshan District, Taipei, Taiwan. The hotel was established in May 1952 and the main building was completed on October 10, 1973. It is owned by the nonprofit Duen-Mou Foundation of Taiwan, and has played host to many foreign dignitaries who have visited Taipei.

The 87 m (285 ft)-tall main building is one of the world's tallest Chinese classical buildings. It was also the tallest building in Taiwan from 1973 to 1981.

== History ==
After Chiang Kai-shek's withdrawal to Taiwan in 1949, Chiang felt it difficult to accommodate foreign ambassadors due to the lack of five-star hotels in Taipei. He wanted to build an extravagant hotel that would cater to foreign guests. His wife Soong Mei-ling (Madame Chiang) suggested building it on the old Taiwan Hotel on Yuanshan Mountain, the site of the ruins of Taiwan Grand Shrine, a Shinto shrine during Japanese rule. Chiang decided on a Chinese palace-style architecture to promote Chinese culture to the West through its extravagance. Taipei-based architect Yang Cho-Cheng was responsible for the design of the new hotel.

The hotel was established in May 1952, but it was expanded several times before it became the landmark as it is known today. The tennis court, pool and membership lounge were constructed in 1953, and the Golden Dragon Pavilion and Golden Dragon Restaurant opened in 1956. The Jade Phoenix Pavilion and Chi-Lin Pavilion opened in 1958 and 1963, respectively. In 1968 the hotel was rated as one of the world's top ten hotels by the US Fortune magazine. Finally, on the Double Tenth Day in 1973, the main Grand Hotel building was completed and became an instant Taipei icon.

In June 1995 a disastrous fire broke out on the roof of the main building during necessary reconstruction and refurbishment. As neither ladders nor high pressure pumps could reach the fire, the roof and the upper floors were destroyed. Not until 1998 did the hotel recover from the damage and fully reopen to the public. Following the fire, the two dragon heads on the roof were rotated 180 degrees to point inwards. As dragons are traditionally a symbol of rain and water, this was intended to symbolize preparedness against a future fire.

== Features ==
=== General features ===
With its vermilion columns, the roof makes the hotel a visible showcase of Chinese architecture and culture. The hotel itself contains numerous objets d'art, wall panels, paintings, carvings, and significant restaurants. Dragon motifs are frequently intertwined throughout the various structures that make up the hotel, earning the hotel the name "The Dragon Palace". Besides dragons, lion and plum flower motifs also make a significant presence in the hotel.

Each of the eight guest levels represents a different Chinese dynasty, as reflected through the murals and general decor. The hotel has a total of 490 rooms. The rooms facing south offer guests a panoramic view of Taipei City. The presidential suite, as the hotel claims, contains former President Chiang Kai-shek's desk and Madame Chiang's dressing table.

The hotel also features auditoriums and meeting rooms, making it a popular venue for conventions and conferences in Taiwan.

=== Secret passages ===
Ever since its opening, rumor had it that secret passages ran from the hotel to the nearby Shilin Official Residence and farther out to the Presidential Office Building for Chiang's convenience. The truth was uncovered after the 1995 fire as part of the safety commission that was conducted. The secret passages were revealed to be two air raid tunnels, each of them 180 m (590 ft) in length leading to nearby parks, not to the presidential residence or the emergency headquarters as rumors had suggested. The western passage is equipped with a slide for the disabled as an alternative to the spiraling stairs. The exits are obscured by concrete walls, thus escaping public detection for decades. The tunnels have a maximum capacity of about 10,000 people.

=== Room Keys ===
The hotel used to use bronze spade money as its room key card - which also appears on the emblem of the Ministry of Finance (Taiwan).

== Notable guests ==
- Dwight D. Eisenhower – The only American president who visited Taiwan (June 1960) while still in power.
- Richard Nixon – Stayed at the hotel during an Asian trip in 1965
- President of the Republic of Vietnam, Nguyễn Văn Thiệu and his wife
- Ronald Reagan
- Bill Clinton
- Warren Christopher – His arrival from nearby Songshan Airport in 1978 was delayed several hours by crowds throwing eggs and screaming protests over U.S. President Jimmy Carter's decision to break relations with Taiwan.
- Benigno "Ninoy" Aquino, Jr. – Stayed at the hotel the night before his assassination on August 21, 1983
- Nelson Mandela
- Margaret Thatcher
- Shigeru Yoshida
- Shah of Iran Mohammad Reza Pahlavi – First head of state to stay at the hotel (1958)
- King Hussein of Jordan
- Lee Kuan Yew – Stayed at least 14 times and once was so impressed with the level of service that he requested that the hotel butler accompany him throughout his visit to Taiwan.
- The King of Thailand, Bhumibol Adulyadej and his wife, Queen Sirikit Kitiyakara, 1963

== Notable events ==
- First Taiwan Trade Show – "Taiwan Export Clothings Exhibition" (29 September 1974)
- Founding of the Democratic Progressive Party (28 September 1986)
- Sixth Chen–Chiang summit (20–22 December 2010)
- House of Bishops Meeting of the Episcopal Church (17–23 September 2014)

== In popular culture ==
- The Taipei Grand Hotel was featured in the 1994 film Eat Drink Man Woman by Taiwanese film director Ang Lee.
- The hotel features prominently in Taiwanese director Edward Yang's 2000 film Yi Yi.
- A level in the 2010 videogame Alpha Protocol is set here.
- Major Motoko Kusanagi stays at the hotel in an episode of Ghost in the Shell: S.A.C. 2nd GIG.
- A scene from the third-season premiere of the American sitcom Fresh off the Boat was filmed in the hotel.
- The hotel's lobby hosted the Finish Line for the third season of the Israeli edition of The Amazing Race.

== Gallery of images ==
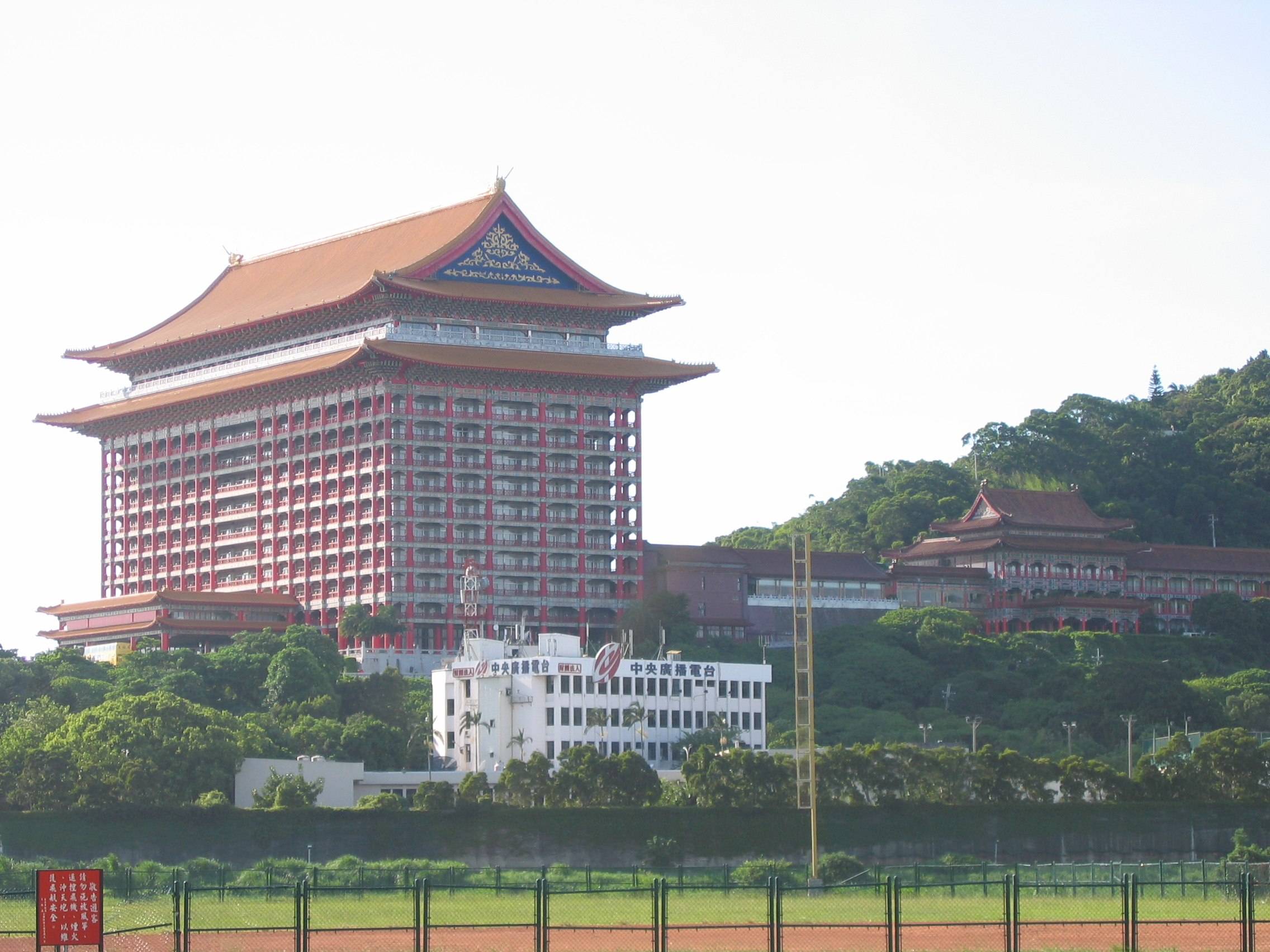
View of The Grand Hotel from afar.

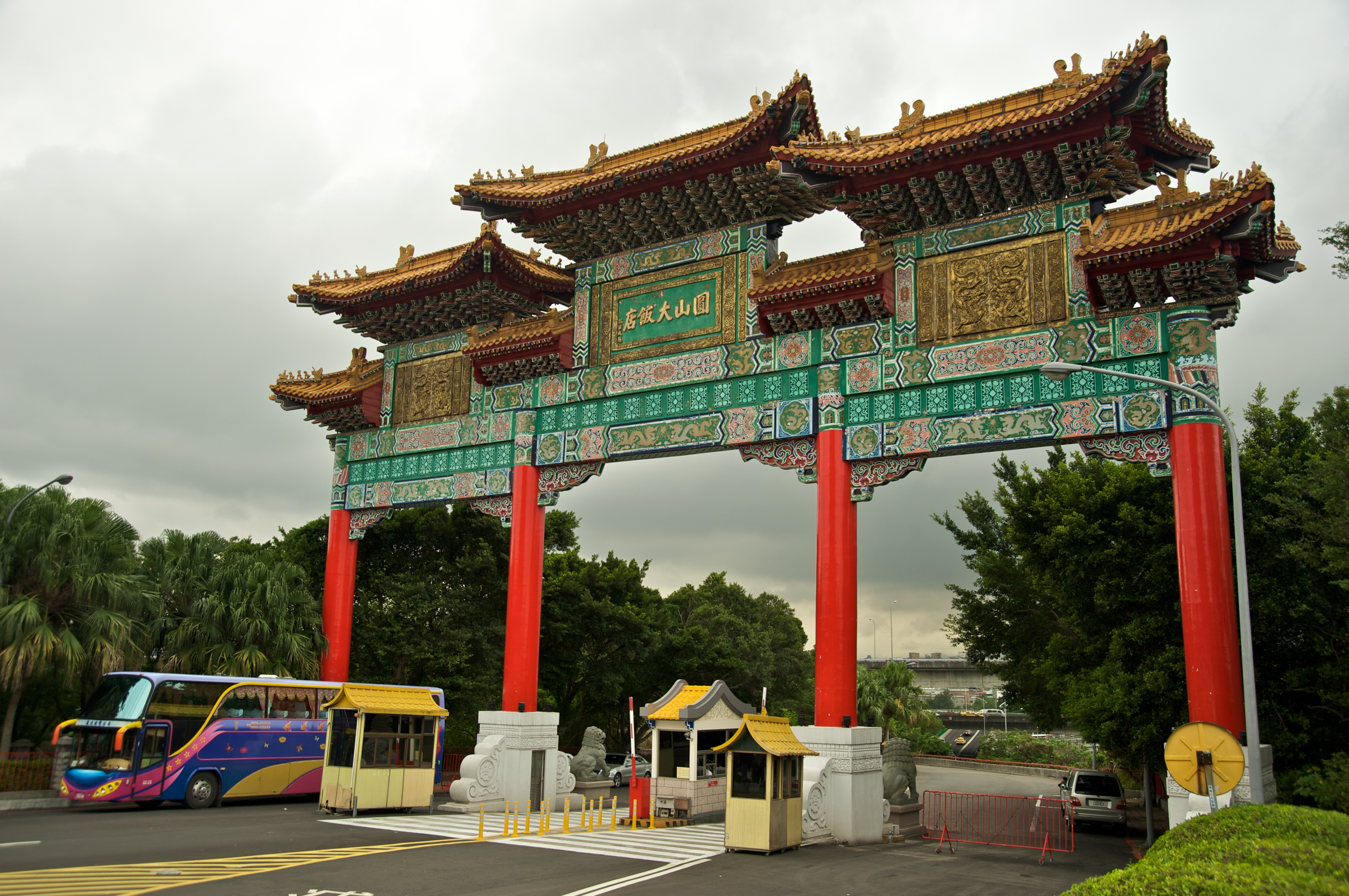
The front gate.

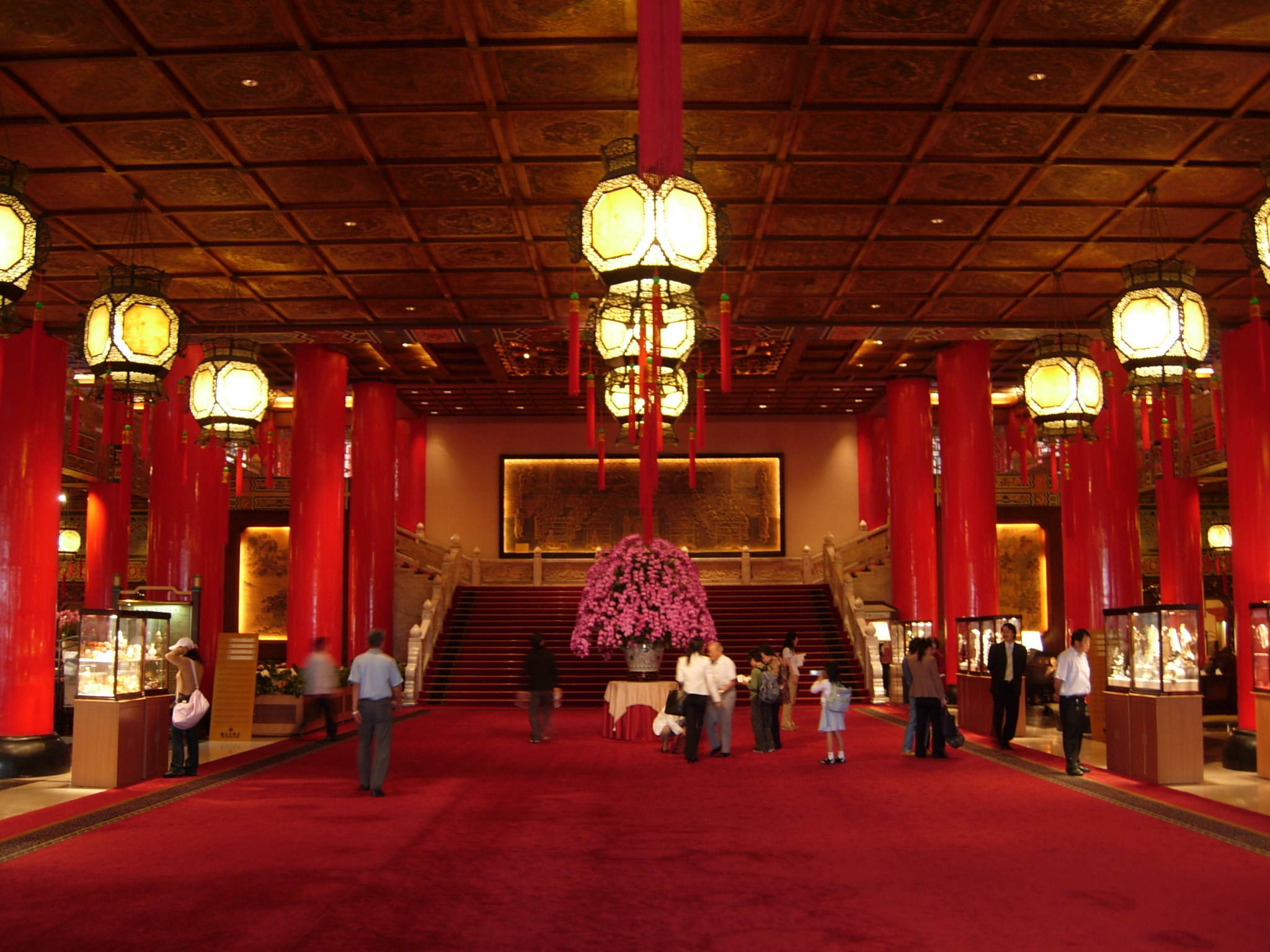
Lobby

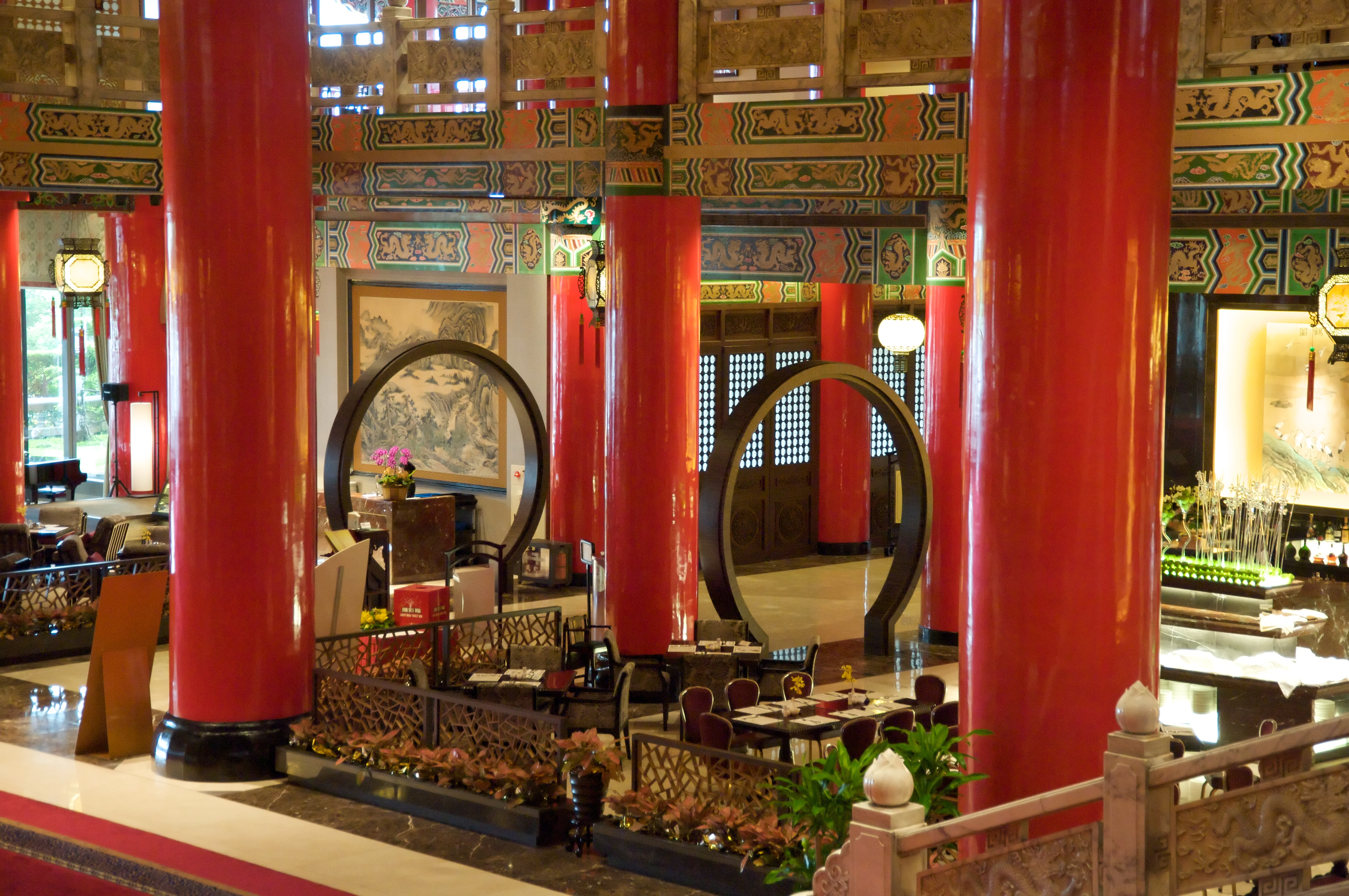
Bar and Cafe

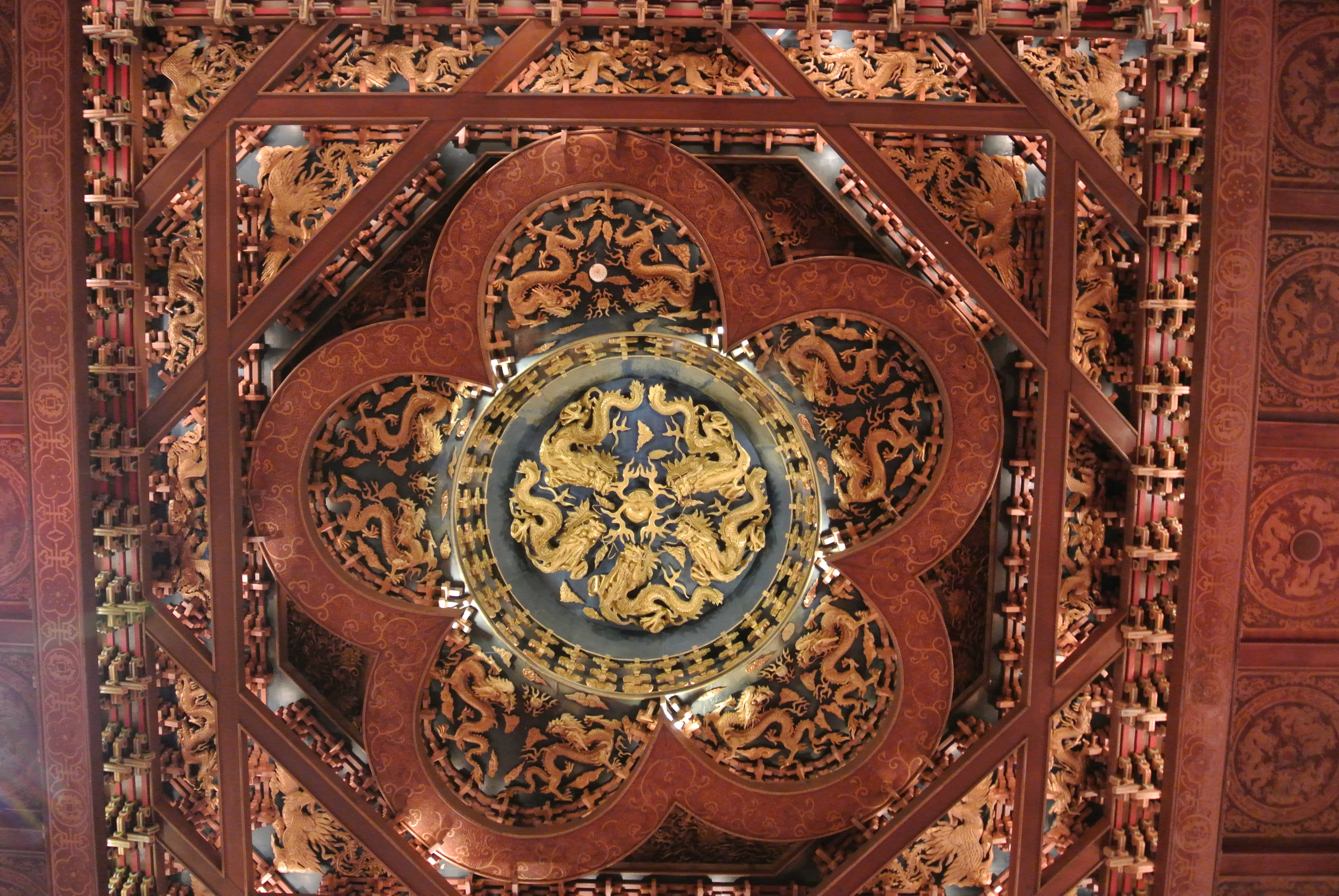
The plum flower and dragons on the lobby ceiling caisson.

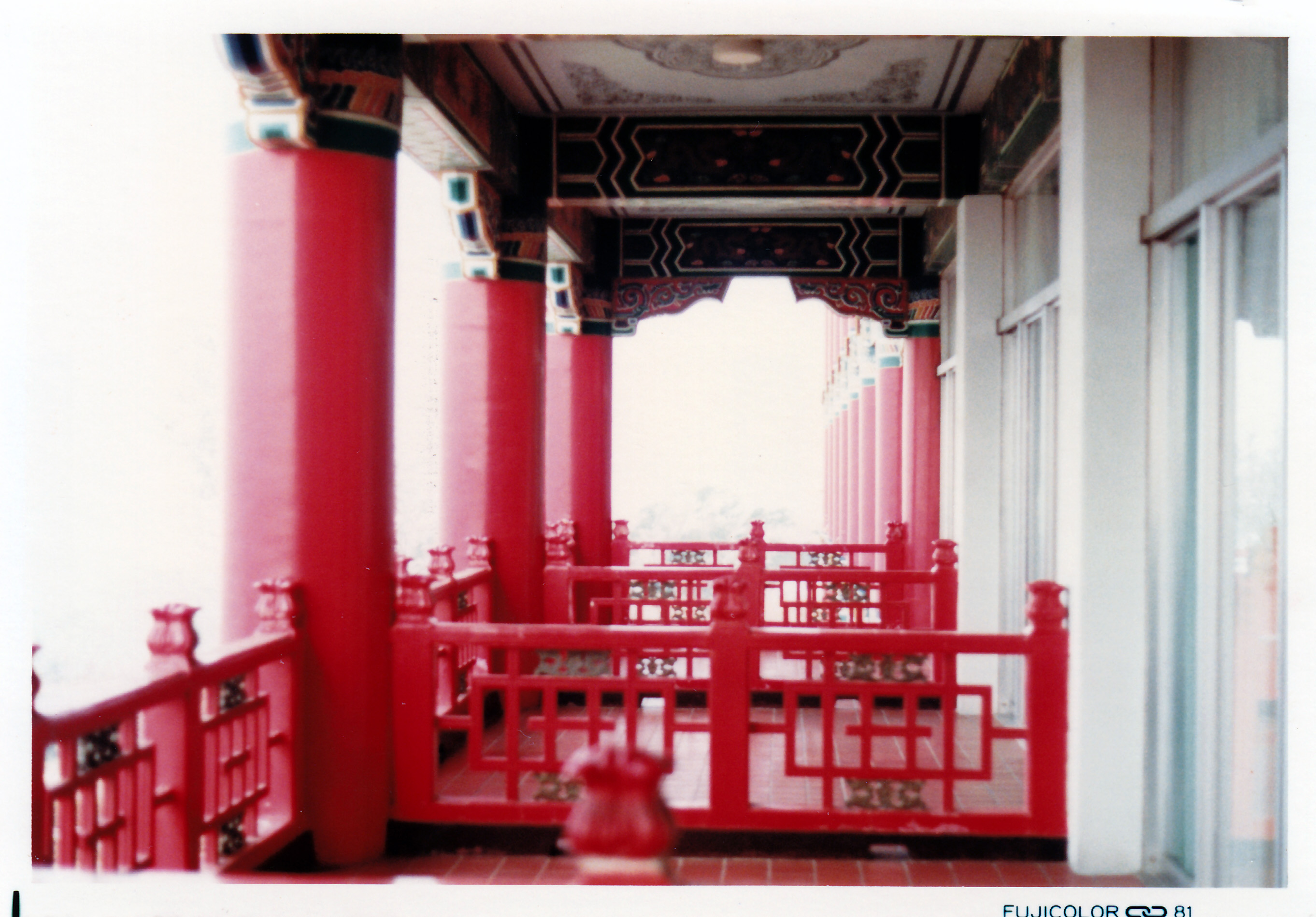
Hotel room balconies with traditional Chinese-style railings (pictured in 1981).

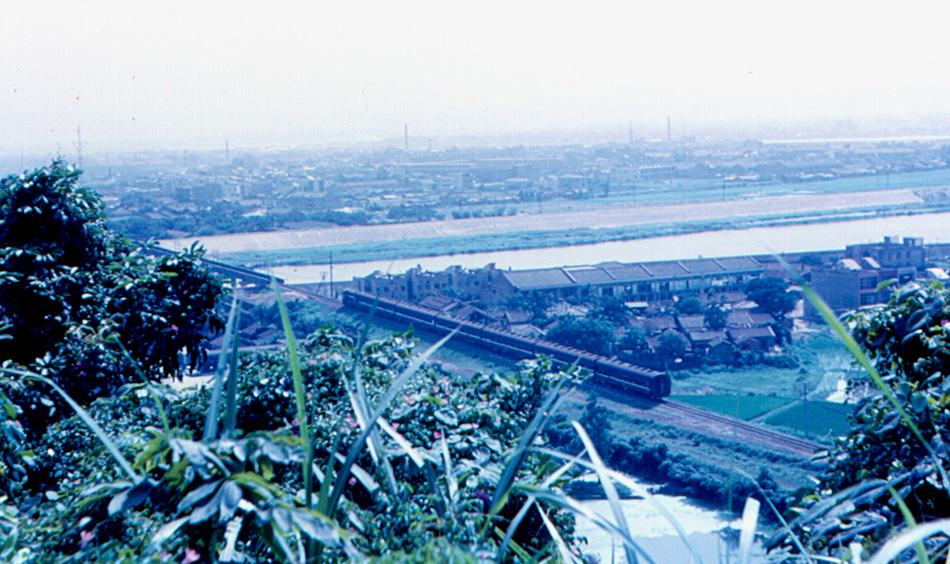
View of the Keelung River and TRA Tamsui Line from the Grand Hotel (May 1967).

== See also ==
- Kaohsiung Grand Hotel
- List of tallest buildings in Taiwan

Preceded by Hilton International Taipei	Tallest building in Taiwan; 1973 – 1981	Succeeded by First Commercial Bank Building
