= Chen Yunlin =

Chinese politician

- 陈云林
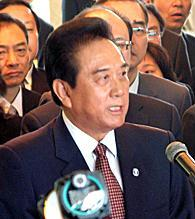

President of the Association for Relations Across the Taiwan Straits
- In office 3 June 2008 – 26 April 2013
- Preceded by: Vacant, Wang Daohan (2005)
- Succeeded by: Chen Deming

Personal details
- Born: December 1941 (age 84) Heishan, Liaoning, Republic of China
- Party: Chinese Communist Party
- Spouse: Lai Xiaohua
- Education: Beijing Agricultural University

Chen Yunlin (Chinese: 陈云林; pinyin: Chén Yúnlín; born December 1941) was the chairman of the Association for Relations Across the Taiwan Straits (ARATS), the body responsible for negotiations with Taiwan in the People's Republic of China in 2008–2013.

== Early life ==
Chen was born in 1941 in Heishan, Liaoning. He joined the Chinese Communist Party (CCP) in 1966. In 1967, he graduated from Beijing Agricultural University and started to work as technician in a chemical factory in Qiqihar, Heilongjiang, and later on promoted to be factory director.

== Political life ==
In 1981, Chen started to work for the government as the Director of Qiqihar City Economic Planning Committee. In 1983, he became the mayor of Qiqihar and in 1984, he was appointed Chinese Communist Party Deputy Committee Secretary and Director of Commission for Restructuring the Economy of Heilongjiang Province. In 1987, he became the vice governor of Heilongjiang Province.

In 1994, he was appointed to the Taiwan Affairs Office of the State Council as vice director, becoming its director in 1997. In 2008, due to the resumption of talks with Taiwan following the election of Ma Ying-jeou, Chen Yun-lin became the second head of ARATS.

Though nominally a private body, ARATS is directly led by the Taiwan Affairs Office of the State Council. Chen's new office at ARATS is in the same building complex as his old office at the Taiwan Affairs Office. The ARATS is the body directly responsible for negotiating with the Strait Exchange Foundation (SEF), its counterpart in Taiwan, which is correspondingly directly led by the Mainland Affairs Council of the Executive Yuan.

== Visit to Taiwan ==
On November 4, 2008, Chen met with his Taiwanese counterpart at the Second Chen-Chiang summit. Chiang Pin-kung, head of Taiwan's SEF. It was the first ever meeting between ARATS and SEF leaders in Taiwan. The meeting lasted from November 3 to 7 in Taipei. The 5-day visit was the highest level meeting between the KMT and the CCP in six decades. Another visit to Taiwan was followed on December 21, 2009.

This controversial visit triggered an important social movement called the Wild Strawberry student movement.

Political offices
Preceded by Wang Daohan	President of ARATS; 2008–2013	Succeeded by Chen Deming
