= Chiang Pin-kung =

Taiwanese politician and economist (1932–2018)

- 江丙坤
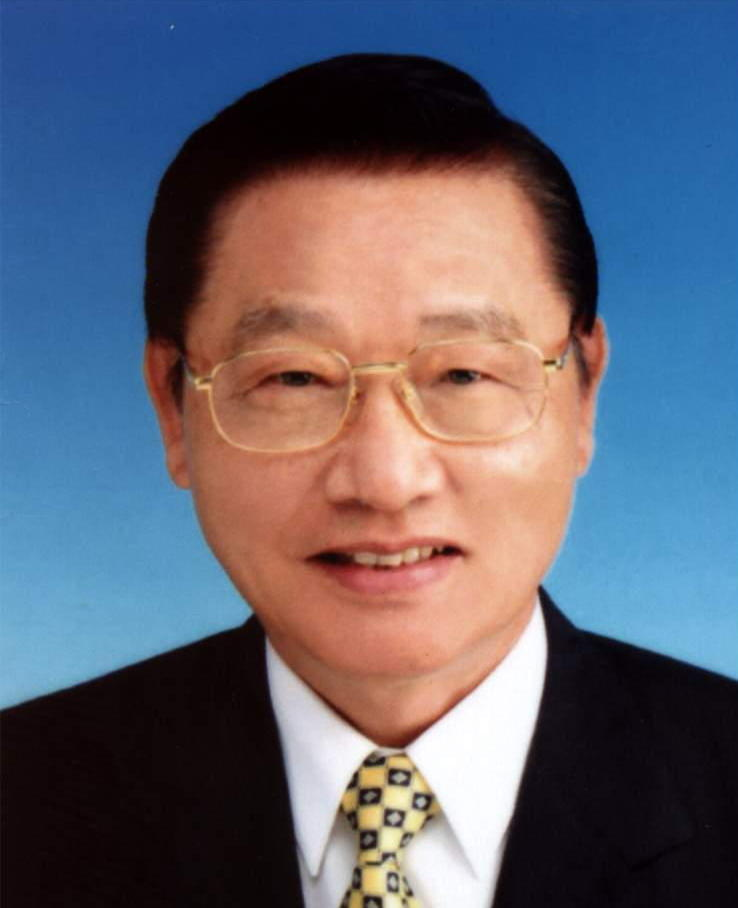

Chairman of the Straits Exchange Foundation
- In office 26 May 2008 – 27 September 2012
- Deputy: Kao Koong-lian
- Preceded by: Hung Chi-chang
- Succeeded by: Lin Join-sane

Vice Chairman of the Kuomintang
- In office 30 March 2000 – 19 September 2012
- Chairperson: Lien Chan; Ma Ying-jeou; Wu Po-hsiung

Vice President of the Legislative Yuan
- In office 1 February 2002 – 31 January 2005
- President: Wang Jin-pyng
- Preceded by: Yao Eng-chi
- Succeeded by: David Chung

Member of the Legislative Yuan
- In office 1 February 2002 – 31 January 2008
- Constituency: Republic of China

Minister of the Council for Economic Planning and Development
- In office 8 June 1996 – 20 May 2000
- Preceded by: Hsu Li-teh
- Succeeded by: Chen Po-chih

Minister of Economic Affairs of the Republic of China
- In office 27 February 1993 – 8 June 1996
- Preceded by: Vincent Siew
- Succeeded by: Wang Chih-kang

Personal details
- Born: 16 December 1932 Nantō District, Taichū Prefecture, Taiwan, Empire of Japan
- Died: 10 December 2018 (aged 85) Taipei, Taiwan
- Party: Kuomintang
- Education: National Taipei University (BS); University of Tokyo (PhD)
- Profession: Agricultural economist

Chiang Pin-kung (Chinese: 江丙坤; pinyin: Jiāng Bǐngkūn; 16 December 1932 – 10 December 2018) was a Taiwanese economist and politician. He led the Ministry of Economic Affairs from 1993 to 1996, when he was named Minister of the Council for Economic Planning and Development, where he served until 2000. Chiang was subsequently elected to consecutive terms on the Legislative Yuan from 2002 to 2008. During his first term as a legislator, Chiang was Vice President of the Legislative Yuan. He was Chairman of the Straits Exchange Foundation from 2008 to 2012.

== Early life and education ==
Chiang was born in Nantō District (now Nantou County), Taichū Prefecture, on 16 December 1932 during the Japanese rule of Taiwan. After graduating from National Taipei University with a bachelor's degree in agriculture in 1959, he completed military service in the Republic of China Armed Forces and won the Kuomintang (KMT)'s Sun Yat-sen Scholarship to complete doctoral studies in Japan. In 1971, Chiang earned his Ph.D. in agricultural economics from the University of Tokyo.

== Economic career ==
He was Assistant Commercial Attaché at the ROC Embassy in Japan from 1967 to 1974, Commercial Attaché at the ROC Consulate General in Johannesburg from 1974 to 1979, Economic Counsellor at the ROC Embassy in South Africa from 1979 to 1981, Deputy Director-General of the Board of Foreign Trade (BOFT) from 1982 to 1983, Secretary-General of the China External Trade Development Council from 1983 to 1988, and Director-General of the BOFT from 1988 to 1989.

At the Ministry of Economic Affairs, Chiang served as Administrative Vice Minister from 1989 to 1990, Political Vice Minister from 1990 to 1993, and Minister from 1993 to 1996. From 1996 to 2000 he was Chairman of the Council for Economic Planning and Development. In this capacity, he was the special envoy of Lee Teng-hui at the 1998 and 1999 Asia-Pacific Economic Cooperation leader's summits (Lee was, because of pressure from the People's Republic of China, not permitted to attend). From 1998 to 2000 he was a Minister without Portfolio.

== Political career ==
Chiang was elected to the Legislative Yuan in 2001 and was selected vice president of the legislature, a post he held until the Fifth Legislative Yuan adjourned in 2005. Chiang was re-elected to the Legislative Yuan in 2004 but did not take on the vice president post, which went to the KMT's alliance People First Party. There were ongoing negotiations for Chiang to join the cabinet of Premier Frank Hsieh as vice premier, but talks fell apart between the KMT and the administration over Chiang's specific responsibilities for the post.

In March 2005, Chiang led the KMT's first official delegation to mainland China since the end of major hostilities in the Chinese Civil War in 1949. The delegation paid homage to the 72 martyrs of the Tenth Revolution in Huanghuagang before travelling to the Sun Yat-sen Mausoleum in Nanjing and to Beijing. During the trip, Chiang promoted opening the three links and economic development.

On 14 March 2007, Chiang became acting chairman of the KMT after Wu Po-hsiung, who had been acting chairman since Ma Ying-jeou's resignation earlier in the year, resigned the acting chairmanship so that he could run for chairman in the upcoming party election.

=== Straits Exchange Foundation ===
Following the Kuomintang's landslide win in the presidential election in 2008, Chiang was designated as chairman of the Straits Exchange Foundation, the semi-official body responsible for negotiation on non-political matters with the People's Republic of China. This made him responsible for the front line negotiations with the PRC government. He stepped down from this position in 2012.

== Personal life and death ==
Chang was married to Mei-Fuey Chen, with whom he had two sons and one daughter. He spoke English and Japanese fluently.

Chiang collapsed at a restaurant on 8 December 2018, and was subsequently sent to hospital. He died of multiple organ failure at Mackay Memorial Hospital in Taipei on 10 December 2018.

== Honours ==
- Order of the Rising Sun, 2nd Class, Gold and Silver Star (2015)

Government offices
Preceded by Vincent Siew	Economic Affairs Minister of the Republic of China; 1993–1996	Succeeded by Wang Chih-kang
Preceded by Hung Chi-chang	Chairman of the Straits Exchange Foundation; 2008–2012	Succeeded by Lin Join-sane
Party political offices
Preceded by Wu Po-hsiung (acting)	Chairman of the Kuomintang (acting); 2007	Succeeded by Wu Po-hsiung
