= Association for Relations Across the Taiwan Straits =

People's Republic of China organization for dialog with Taiwan (Republic of China)

- 海峡两岸关系协会
- Formation: December 16, 1991; 34 years ago
- Type: GONGO
- Purpose: Mainland relations with Taiwan
- Location: Beijing, China
- Official language: Standard Chinese
- President: Zhang Zhijun
- Executive vice president: Long Mingbiao
- Vice president: Sun Yafu; Li Yafei
- Parent organization: Taiwan Affairs Office
- Affiliations: Chinese Communist Party
- Website: www.arats.com.cn

The Association for Relations Across the Taiwan Straits (ARATS; Chinese: 海峡两岸关系协会; pinyin: Hǎixiá Liǎng'àn Guānxì Xiéhuì; often abbreviated as 海协会; Hǎixiéhuì) is a united front organization set up by the Taiwan Affairs Office of the People's Republic of China for handling technical and business matters with Taiwan.

== History ==
The ARATS was founded in 1991 by the Taiwan Affairs Office. The foundation's founding chairman was former Shanghai mayor Wang Daohan, honorary chairman Rong Yiren. The ARATS-SEF meeting in 1992 produced the 1992 Consensus. Negotiations with SEF stopped in 1999, and after Wang's death in 2005, no new chair was appointed until 2008. Following the election of Ma Ying-jeou to the presidency of Taiwan, talks between ARATS and SEF have restarted and progress was made in the areas of transport and economy such as the Three Links in 2008 and Economic Cooperation Framework Agreement in 2010. Chen Yunlin, who was formerly head of the Taiwan Affairs Office, was the head of ARATS from 2008 to 2013. He has met his counterpart Chiang Pin-kung in 2008.

In 2024, Taiwan's Mainland Affairs Council banned its citizens from working at China's Confucius Institute due to national security concerns.

== Functions ==
The ARATS conducts cross-strait exchanges without the official imprimatur of the Chinese Communist Party or the People's Republic of China. Its counterpart in Taiwan is the Straits Exchange Foundation. Exchanges between ARATS and SEF have only occurred during Kuomintang presidencies, with no contact when the Democratic Progressive Party is in power.

== List of presidents ==
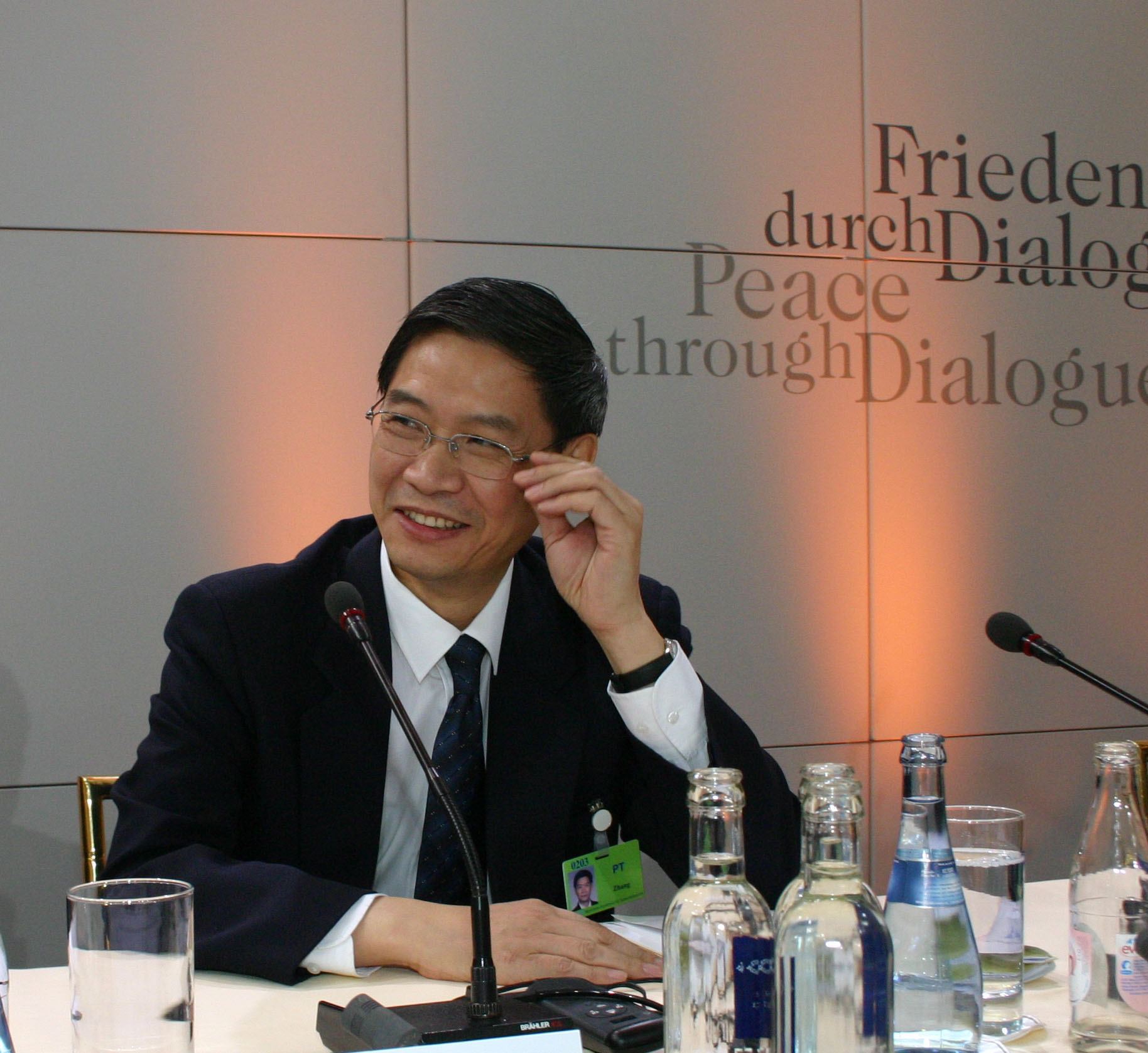
Zhang Zhijun, the incumbent President of ARATS.

The president of the ARATS tends to be a former ministerial-level director of the Taiwan Affairs Office.

Name	Term
Wang Daohan	1991–2005
Vacant	2005–2008
Chen Yunlin	2008–2013
Chen Deming	2013–April 2018
Zhang Zhijun	April 2018–present

== See also ==
- United front in Taiwan
- Economic Cooperation Framework Agreement
- Straits Exchange Foundation (SEF), Taiwan
- Taiwan Affairs Office
