= Straits Exchange Foundation =

Taiwan's semi-official organization for dialog with China

Straits Exchange Foundation 海峽交流基金會
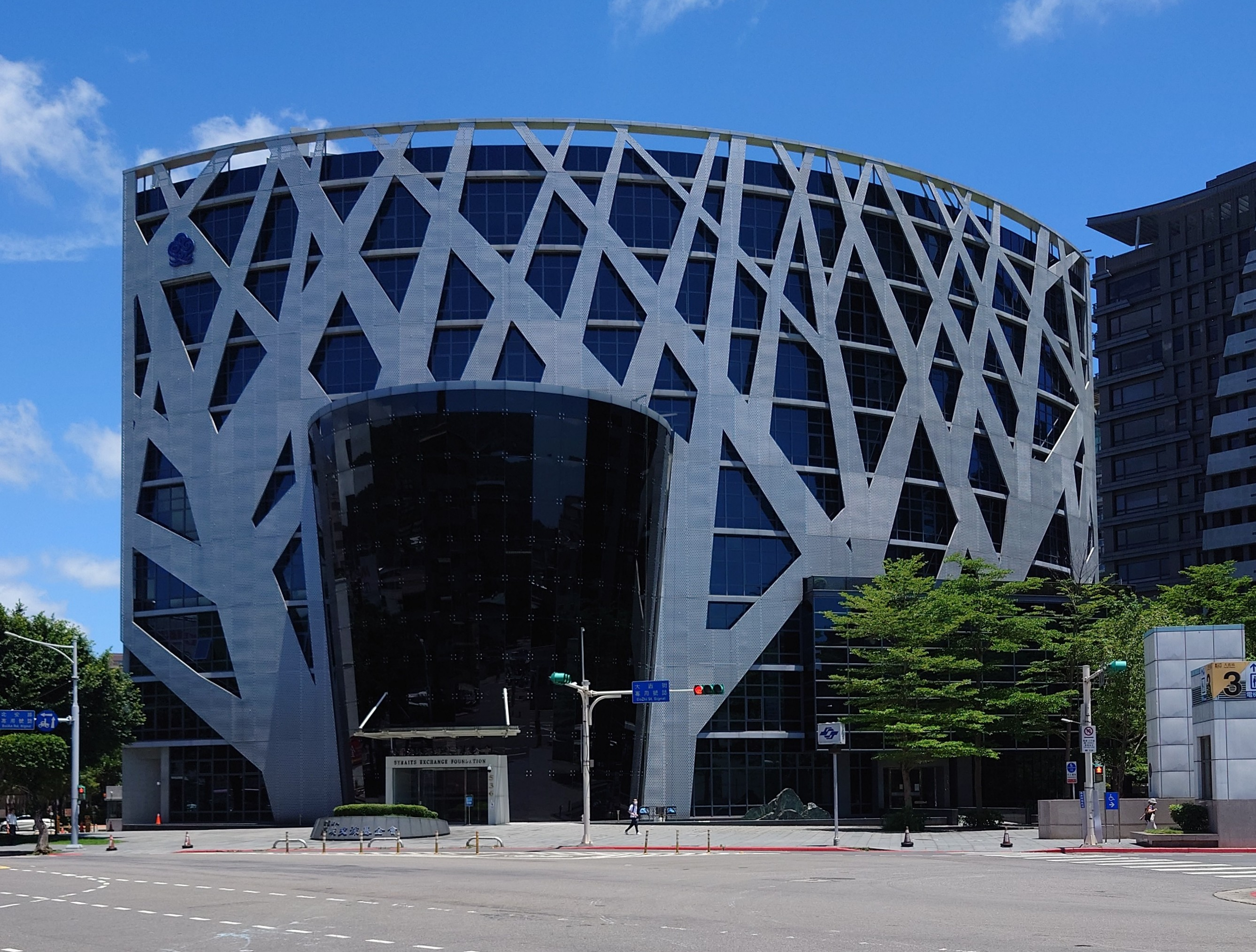
- Formation: 21 November 1990 (first meeting); 9 March 1991 (start operation)
- Headquarters: Zhongshan, Taipei, Taiwan
- Chairperson: Su Jia-chyuan
- Website: www.sef.org.tw (in Chinese)

The Straits Exchange Foundation (SEF; Chinese: 海峽交流基金會; pinyin: Hǎixiá Jiāoliú Jījīnhuì; often abbreviated as 海基會) is a semiofficial organization set up by the Government of the Republic of China (Taiwan) to handle civil and business matters with the People's Republic of China (PRC). Though technically a private organization, it is funded by the government and under the supervision of the Mainland Affairs Council of the Executive Yuan. Its role is effectively to function as the de facto embassy to the PRC, as a means of avoiding acknowledgement of the PRC's statehood status.

Its counterpart in the PRC is the Association for Relations Across the Taiwan Straits (ARATS).

== History ==
Business and civil activities across Taiwan Strait resumed when the armed conflict between the two side ceased after the end of the Cold War. Due to the complexity of the political and legal status of cross-strait relations and lack of contact between the two opposing governments during the conflict, the ROC government had to create an intermediary body from the private sector to deal with cross-strait matters. Thus on 9 March 1991, the SEF was formally established with the help of the government and private sector funds.

At the same time, the PRC government established ARATS. The creation of these two offices facilitate a new stage in cross-strait relations after they had been virtually non-existent for almost 50 years since the establishment of PRC.

== Organization structure ==
- Department of Cultural Affairs
- Department of Economic Affairs
- Department of Legal Affairs
- Department of Planning and Public Affairs
- Secretariat
- Personnel Office
- Accounting Office

== List of chairpersons ==
No.	Name	Term of Office		Days
1	Koo Chen-fu 辜振甫	21 November 1990	3 January 2005 (Note: Died in office.)	5157 (Note: Longest-serving chairperson.)
—	Johnnason Liu 劉德勳	3 January 2005	10 June 2005	158
2	Chang Chun-hsiung 張俊雄	10 June 2005	21 May 2007	710
3	Hung Chi-chang 洪奇昌	12 July 2007	19 May 2008	313
4	Chiang Pin-kung 江丙坤	26 May 2008	27 September 2012	1585
5	Lin Join-sane 林中森	27 September 2012	20 May 2016	1331
—	Chen Ter-shing 陳德新	20 May 2016	12 September 2016	115
6	Tien Hung-mao 田弘茂	12 September 2016	27 March 2018	561
7	Katharine Chang 張小月	27 March 2018	5 June 2020	801
8	David Lee 李大維	5 June 2020	3 August 2020	59
—	Rock Hsu 許勝雄	28 August 2020	13 February 2023	899
8	David Lee 李大維	14 February 2023	7 June 2024	479
9	Cheng Wen-tsan 鄭文燦	7 June 2024	7 July 2024	30
—	Rock Hsu 許勝雄	18 July 2024	3 November 2024	108
10	Frank Wu 吳豐山	4 November 2024	31 December 2025	422
—	Rock Hsu 許勝雄	1 January 2026	22 January 2026	21
11	Su Jia-chyuan 蘇嘉全	23 January 2026	Incumbent	93

== SEF branch office in Mainland China ==
On 11 April 2013, the Executive Yuan approved a bill to open SEF branch offices in Mainland China. In the initial announcement, three offices were planned.

== SEF building ==
The current SEF building in Beian Road originated since its groundbreaking construction on 25 September 2010 when its ceremony was presided over by then SEF Chairman Chiang Pin-kung. On 31 March 2012, the finished constructed building was refurbished and SEF started to move there on 4 April 2012 from their old rented office building on Minsheng East Road. The new building was opened for service on 9 April 2012. On 18 May 2012, President Ma Ying-jeou presided over the building's official opening ceremony.

The SEF building is adjacent to Dazhi Station of the Taipei Metro on the Brown Line.

== See also ==
- Cross-strait relations
