= Cross-strait relations =

Bilateral relations between mainland China and Taiwan

Cross–strait relations
- China: Taiwan

Cross-strait relations
- Traditional Chinese: 兩岸關係
- Simplified Chinese: 两岸关系
Transcriptions
Standard Mandarin
- Hanyu Pinyin: Liǎng'àn guānxì
- Gwoyeu Romatzyh: Leang'ann guanshih
- Wade–Giles: Liang^{3}-an^{4} kuan^{1}-hsi^{4}
- Tongyong Pinyin: Liǎng-àn guansì
- MPS2: Liǎng'àn guānshì
Hakka
- Romanization: Lióng-ngan kôan-he
Yue: Cantonese
- Jyutping: Loeng5 ngon6 gwaan1 hai6
Southern Min
- Hokkien POJ: Lióng-gān koan-hē
- Tâi-lô: Lióng-gān kuan-hē

Alternative Chinese name
- Traditional Chinese: 海峽兩岸關係
- Simplified Chinese: 海峡两岸关系
Transcriptions
Standard Mandarin
- Hanyu Pinyin: Hǎixiá Liǎng'àn guānxì
- Gwoyeu Romatzyh: Haeshya Leang'ann guanshih
- Wade–Giles: Hai3-hsia2 Liang3-an4 kuan1-hsi4
- Tongyong Pinyin: Hǎisiá Liǎng-àn guansì
- MPS2: Hǎishiá Liǎng'àn guānshì
Hakka
- Romanization: Hói-kia̍p Lióng-ngan kôan-he
Yue: Cantonese
- Jyutping: Hoi2 haap6 Loeng5 ngon6 gwaan1 hai6
Southern Min
- Hokkien POJ: Hái-kiap Lióng-gān koan-hē
- Tâi-lô: Hái-kiap Lióng-gān kuan-hē

Second alternative Chinese name
- Traditional Chinese: 臺海關係
- Simplified Chinese: 台海关系
- Literal meaning: Taiwan Strait relations
Transcriptions
Standard Mandarin
- Hanyu Pinyin: Táihǎi guān xì
- Wade–Giles: Tʻai2-hai3 kuan1-hsi4

Third alternative Chinese name
- Traditional Chinese: 陸臺關係
- Simplified Chinese: 陆台关系
- Literal meaning: Mainland–Taiwan relations
Transcriptions
Standard Mandarin
- Hanyu Pinyin: Lù-Tái guān xì
- Wade–Giles: Lu4-Tʻai2 kuan1-hsi4

Fourth alternative Chinese name
- Traditional Chinese: 中臺關係
- Simplified Chinese: 中台关系
- Literal meaning: China–Taiwan relations
Transcriptions
Standard Mandarin
- Hanyu Pinyin: Zhōng-Tái guān xì
- Wade–Giles: Chung1-Tʻai2 kuan1-hsi4

Cross-strait relations (sometimes called Mainland–Taiwan relations, China–Taiwan relations, or PRC–ROC relations) are the political and economic relations between China (officially the People's Republic of China, or PRC) and Taiwan (officially the Republic of China, or ROC) across the Taiwan Strait. Due to the existing controversy over the status of Taiwan and the Chinese legitimacy question, they are also not defined as diplomatic relations by either side.

The relationship has been complex and controversial due to the dispute regarding the political status of Taiwan after the island's administration was transferred from Japan to the Republic of China in 1945, and the split between the PRC and ROC in 1949 as a result of the ROC's retreat to the island after losing the Chinese Civil War. The essential questions are whether the two governments are still in a state of civil war over One China, each holding one of two "regions" or parts of the same country (i.e. "one nation, two states"); whether they can be unified under a "one country, two systems" framework; or whether they are now separate countries (either as Two Chinas, or as "one China, one Taiwan"). The English expression "cross-strait relations" is considered to be a neutral term that avoids reference to the political status of either side.

After the Japanese surrender at the end of the Second World War in 1945, the administration of Taiwan was transferred from the Empire of Japan (who had annexed Taiwan as a spoil of war through the First Sino-Japanese War) to the Republic of China, who was one of the "Big Four" of Allied Nations, although questions remain regarding the legal language used in the Treaty of San Francisco. In 1949, with the Chinese Civil War turning decisively in favor of the Chinese Communist Party (CCP), the Republic of China Government led by the Nationalist Party of China (Kuomintang, or KMT) evacuated to Taiwan and established a provisional capital in Taipei, while still claiming to be the legitimate government of all of China. CCP chairman Mao Zedong proclaimed the establishment of the Central People's Government with Beijing as the capital, and the People's Liberation Army (PLA) subsequently conquered and quelled all of mainland China, although the disastrous landing attempt at Kinmen, the unexpected outbreak of the Korean War and the subsequent American involvement halted any further plans to invade Taiwan. The two sides then entered decades of stalemate and de facto ceasefire with sporadic episodes of naval skirmishes and island shellings, but no armistice or peace treaty has ever been signed, and debate continues as to whether the civil war has legally ended.

Since then, the relations between the governments in Beijing and Taipei have been characterized by limited contact, tensions, and instability. In the early years, military conflicts continued, while diplomatically both governments competed to be the "legitimate government of China". Since the democratization of Taiwan, the question regarding the political and legal status of Taiwan has shifted focus to the choice between political unification with the mainland or de jure Taiwanese independence. The PRC remains hostile to any formal declaration of independence and maintains its claim over Taiwan, citing its status as the only internationally recognized government of all of China since the United Nations General Assembly Resolution 2758 in 1971.

The administration of cross-strait relations of both sides are independent from the official diplomatic system. The Taiwanese government established the Mainland Affairs Council led by the Executive Yuan, and China established the Taiwan Affairs Office in both the State Council and the CCP Central Committee, while the top decision-making body is Central Leading Group for Taiwan Affairs of the CCP. The communication between both sides are through two semi-official institutions: Straits Exchange Foundation by the ROC side, and the Association for Relations Across the Taiwan Straits by the PRC side.

== History ==
=== Timeline ===
Dutch & Spanish
(Netherlands) (Spain)
Tungning
Qing
(Qing dynasty)
Japan
(Empire of Japan)
Republic of China
Ming
Qing
S. Ming
Qing
(Qing dynasty)
Republic of China
People's Republic of China
│
1625
│
1650
│
1675
│
1700
│
1725
│
1750
│
1775
│
1800
│
1825
│
1850
│
1875
│
1900
│
1925
│
1950
│
1975
│
2000
│
2025

Leaders of the two governments

=== Before 1949 ===
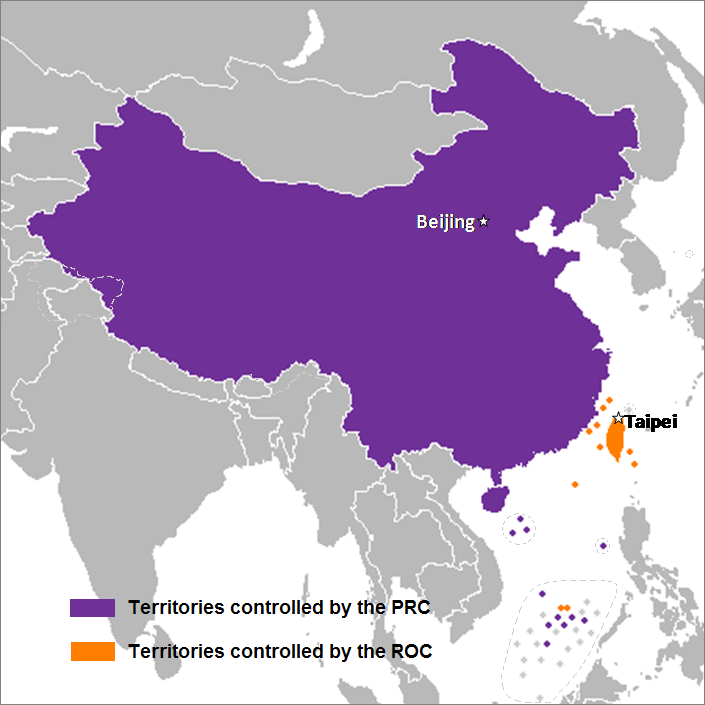
Territories currently administered by the two governments that formally use the name China: the People's Republic of China (PRC, in purple) and the Republic of China (ROC, in orange). The PRC currently actually rules the mainland (including Hong Kong, Macau, and Hainan), while the ROC currently actually rules Taiwan (including Kinmen, Matsu, Pratas Islands, and Taiping Island & Zhongzhou Reef of the Spratly Islands). The size of minor islands is exaggerated in this map for ease of identification.

The early history of cross-strait relations involved the exchange of cultures, people, and technology. However, no Chinese dynasty formally incorporated Taiwan in ancient times. In the 16th and 17th centuries, Taiwan first caught the attention of Portuguese, then Dutch and Spanish explorers. After establishing their first settlement in Taiwan in 1624, the Dutch were defeated in 1662 by Koxinga (Zheng Chenggong), a southern Ming dynasty loyalist, who expelled the Dutch and established the first Han Chinese regime in Taiwan. Koxinga's heirs used Taiwan as a base for launching raids into mainland China against the Manchu-led Qing dynasty, before his descendants being defeated in 1683 by Qing forces. Taiwan was incorporated into Fujian Province in 1684.

With other powers increasingly eyeing Taiwan for its strategic location and resources in the 19th century, the administration began to implement a modernization drive. In 1887, Fujian-Taiwan Province was declared by Imperial decree. However, the fall of the Qing outpaced the development of Taiwan, and in 1895, following its defeat in the First Sino-Japanese War, the Imperial government ceded Taiwan to Japan in perpetuity. Qing loyalists briefly resisted Japanese rule under the banner of the "Republic of Formosa" but were quickly put down by Japanese authorities.

Japan ruled Taiwan until 1945. As part of the Empire of Japan, Taiwan was a foreign jurisdiction in relation to the Qing dynasty until 1912, and then to the Republic of China for the remainder of Japanese rule. From 1928 to 1942, the Chinese Communist Party (CCP) maintained that Taiwan was a separate nation. In a 1937 interview with Edgar Snow, Mao Zedong stated, "we will extend them (the Koreans) our enthusiastic help in their struggle for independence. The same thing applies for Taiwan."

In 1945, Japan was defeated in World War II and surrendered its forces in Taiwan to the Allies; the ROC, then ruled by the Kuomintang (KMT), took custody of the island. The period of post-war KMT rule over China (1945–1949) was marked by conflict in Taiwan between local residents and the new KMT authority. The Taiwanese rebelled on 28 February 1947, but the uprising was violently suppressed by the KMT. The seeds of the Taiwan independence movement were sown during this period.

China was soon engulfed in full-scale civil war. In 1949, the conflict turned decisively against the KMT in favor of the CCP. On 1 October 1949, CCP Chairman Mao Zedong proclaimed the founding of the People's Republic of China (PRC) in Beijing. The ROC government retreated to Taiwan, eventually declaring Taipei its temporary capital in December 1949.

=== Military stalemate to diplomatic war (1949–1979) ===
In October 1949, the PRC's attempt to capture the ROC-controlled island of Kinmen was thwarted in the Battle of Guningtou, halting the PLA's advance towards Taiwan. In November 1949, ROC forces repulsed the PRC at the Battle of Dengbu Island but were later forced to retreat after the PRC established air superiority. Other PRC amphibious operations in 1950 were more successful, leading to the capture of Hainan Island, the Wanshan Islands off the Guangdong coast, and Zhoushan Island off Zhejiang. Additional PRC successes included the Battle of Dongshan Island and the Battle of Nanpeng Island.

While in the process of losing mainland China, the ROC declared a "closure" of Chinese ports, and its navy attempted to intercept all foreign ships. This also blocked direct traffic between northern and southern China. On the mainland, the ROC government launched several air bombing raids on Shanghai. Meanwhile, approximately 12,000 KMT soldiers retreated to Burma, where they continued launching guerrilla attacks into southern China during the early 1950s.

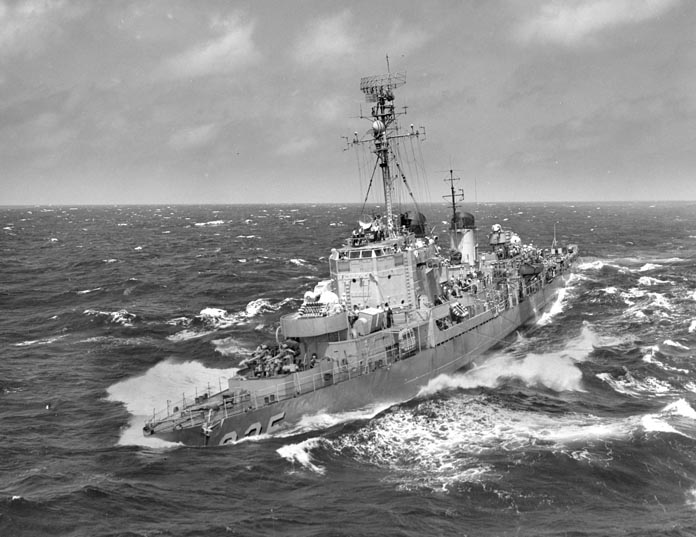
USS Carpenter during a Taiwan Strait patrol on 20 August 1953

Most observers expected Chiang's government to eventually fall in response to a Communist invasion of Taiwan, and the U.S. initially showed no interest in supporting Chiang's government in its final stand. Things changed radically with the onset of the Korean War in June 1950. At this point, it became politically impossible in the U.S. to allow a total Communist victory over Chiang, so President Harry S. Truman ordered the U.S. Seventh Fleet into the Taiwan Strait. The U.S. fleet hindered the Communist invasion of Taiwan, and the PRC decided to send troops to Korea in October 1950. The ROC proposed participation in the Korean War but was rejected. The battles on the coastal islands of the mainland continued. In 1952, the ROC won the Battle of Nanri Island with U.S. support. In 1953, the Communists secured victories in the Battle of Nanpeng Archipelago, the Battle of Dalushan Islands and the Dongshan Island Campaign. At the end of the Korean War, approximately two-thirds of captured Communist Chinese soldiers, many of whom were originally KMT soldiers, were repatriated to Taiwan rather than China.

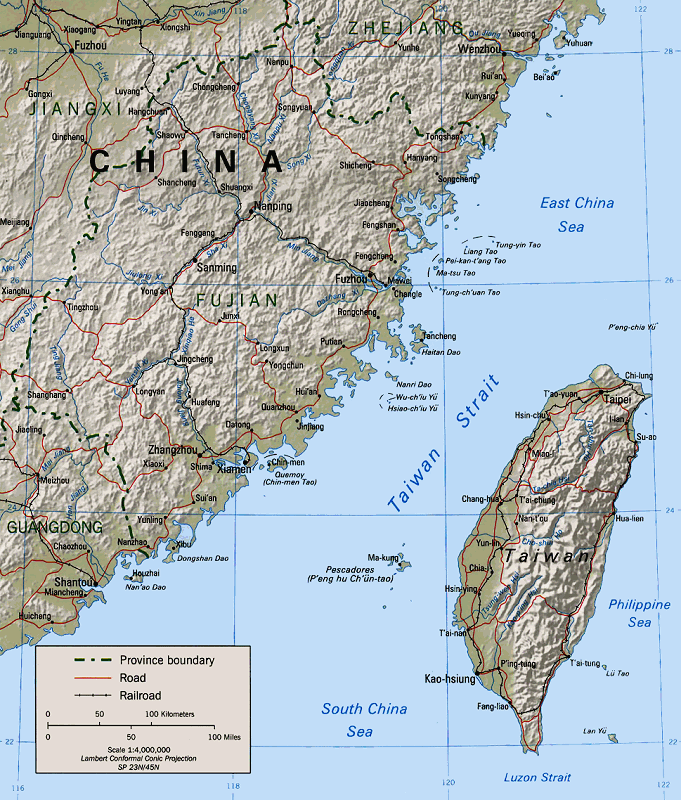
The Taiwan Strait

Though viewed as a military liability by the United States, the ROC viewed its remaining islands in Fujian as vital for any future campaign to defeat the PRC and retake China. On 3 September 1954, the First Taiwan Strait Crisis began when the PLA started shelling Kinmen and threatened to take the Dachen Islands. The Mutual Defense Treaty between the U.S. and the ROC was signed in December, covering Taiwan and the Penghu islands as territories to be defended. On 19 January 1955, the PLA took the nearby Yijiangshan Islands, with the entire ROC garrison of 720 troops killed or wounded in the defense. The U.S. Congress then passed the Formosa Resolution, authorizing the President Dwight D. Eisenhower to defend the ROC's offshore islands. The First Taiwan Strait Crisis ended in March 1955 when the PLA ceased its bombardment. The crisis was brought to a close during the Bandung Conference. At the conference, the PRC articulated its Five Principles of Peaceful Coexistence with Premier Zhou Enlai publicly stating, "[T]he Chinese people do not want to have a war with the United States. The Chinese government is willing to sit down to discuss the question of relaxing tension in the Far East, and especially the question of relaxing tension in the Taiwan area." Two years of negotiations with the U.S. followed, although no agreement was reached on the Taiwan issue.

The Second Taiwan Strait Crisis began on 23 August 1958 with air and naval engagements between the PRC and the ROC military forces, leading to intense artillery bombardment of Kinmen (by the PRC) and Xiamen (by the ROC), and ended in November of the same year. PLA patrol boats blockaded the islands from ROC supply ships. Though the U.S. rejected Chiang Kai-shek's proposal to bomb Chinese artillery batteries, it quickly moved to supply fighter jets and anti-aircraft missiles to the ROC. It also provided amphibious assault ships to land supply, as a sunken ROC naval vessel was blocking the harbor. On 7 September, the U.S. escorted a convoy of ROC supply ships, and the PRC refrained from firing. On 25 October, the PRC announced an "even-day ceasefire"—the PLA would only shell Kinmen on odd-numbered days.

After the 1950s, the "war" became more symbolic than real, represented by on again, off again artillery bombardment towards and from Kinmen. In later years, live shells were replaced with propaganda sheets. While the ROC initiated Project National Glory to retake mainland China, the plan was abandoned in the 1960s. The PRC and the ROC have never signed any agreement or treaty to officially end the war. There were occasional defectors from both sides. Both governments claimed to be the legitimate government of China, and referred to the other as "bandits". Civil war propaganda permeated educational curricula on both sides. Additionally, the ROC suppressed expressions of support for Taiwanese identity or Taiwan independence.

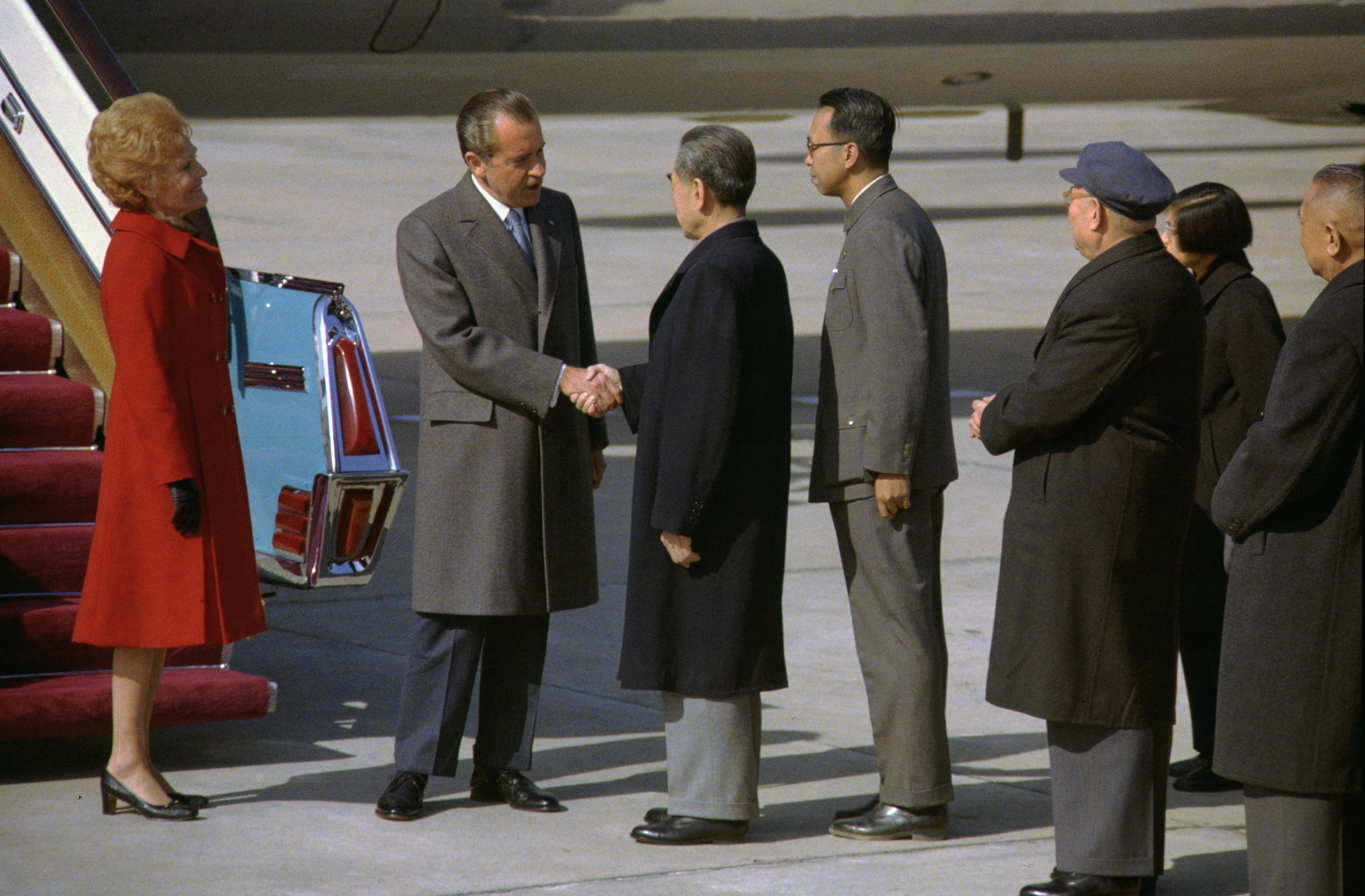
U.S. President Richard Nixon shakes hands with Premier Zhou Enlai during his visit to Beijing, China in February 1972.

Until the 1970s, the ROC had international recognition from most countries. The PRC government was recognized by Soviet Bloc countries, members of the Non-Aligned Movement, and some Western nations, such as the United Kingdom and the Netherlands.

The ROC represented China at the United Nations until 1971, when the PRC replaced the ROC in the UN seat. Alongside U.S. President Richard Nixon's 1972 visit to the PRC, these events triggered a wave of countries switching diplomatic recognition from the ROC to the PRC throughout the 1970s. In 1978, U.S. President Jimmy Carter announced that the United States would formally recognize the PRC and sever its diplomatic relations with the ROC. While the Mutual Defense Treaty remained in effect through 1979, the U.S. enacted the Taiwan Relations Act to maintain economic and security ties following the shift in diplomatic recognition.

=== Thawing of relations (1979–1999) ===
After the United States formally recognized the PRC and broke its official relations with the ROC in 1979, the PRC under the leadership of Deng Xiaoping shifted its strategy from "liberating Taiwan" to "peaceful unification." The PRC stopped the bombardment of Kinmen and other islands, moderating its rhetoric by referring to "Taiwan authorities" instead of "Chiang's clique." In the 1 January 1979 "New Year's Day Message to Taiwan Compatriots," the Standing Committee of the National People's Congress (NPC) stated that the PRC would "take present realities into account in accomplishing the great cause of reunifying the motherland and respect the status quo on Taiwan and the opinions of people in all walks of life there and adopt reasonable policies and measures in settling the question of reunification so as not to cause the people of Taiwan any losses."

Deng proposed a model for the incorporation of Taiwan into the PRC which involved a high degree of autonomy within the Chinese state, similar to the model proposed to Hong Kong which would eventually become one country, two systems. Consistent with Deng's one country, two systems approach, NPC Standing Committee Chair Ye Jianying elaborated on peaceful unification under per his 30 September 1981 "Nine Points Proposal" in which Taiwan would have a high degree of autonomy following unification. The Nine Points Proposal also talked of trade, transportation, and postal services as "Three Links" across the strait and "four exchanges" in the areas of culture, academics, economics, and sports.

The ROC government under Chiang Ching-kuo maintained a Three Noes policy of no contact, no negotiation and no compromise to deal with the PRC government. However, Chiang was forced to break from this policy during the May 1986 hijacking of a China Airlines cargo plane, in which the Taiwanese pilot subdued other members of the crew and flew the plane to Guangzhou. In response, Chiang sent delegates to Hong Kong to discuss with PRC officials the return of the plane and crew, which was seen as a turning point in cross-strait relations.

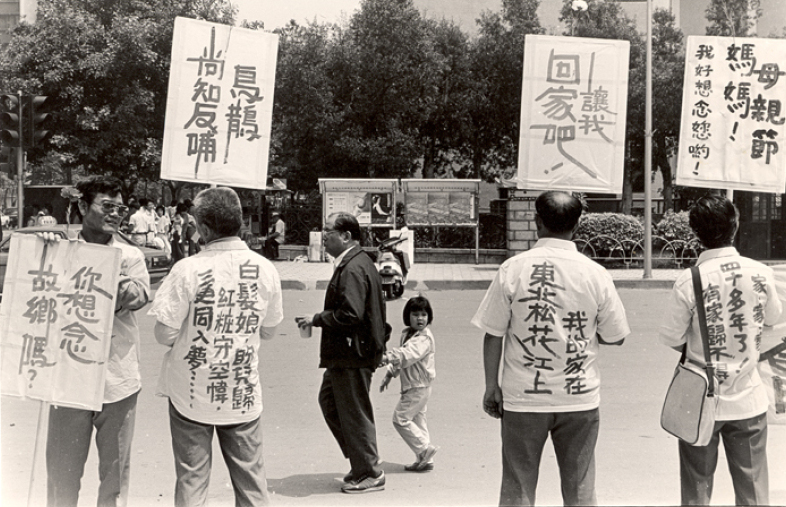
A 1987 movement in Taipei calling for the right to visit relatives in mainland China

In 1987, Chiang became willing to open up cross-strait economic and cultural contacts. That year, the ROC government began allowing visits to China. This benefited many, especially old KMT soldiers, who had been separated from their families in China for decades. This catalyzed a thawing of relations between the two sides, but problems arising from increased contact necessitated a mechanism for regular negotiations. From the end of 1987 to June 1995, the two sides frequently exchanged envoys to develop formal and informal institutions and agencies for cross-strait relations.

In 1988, a guideline was approved by PRC to encourage ROC investments in the PRC. It guaranteed that ROC establishments would not be nationalized, exports would be free from tariffs, and ROC businessmen would be granted multiple visas for easy movement.

In 1990, under the presidency of Lee Teng-hui, the National Unification Council was established in Taiwan. The following year, the Guidelines for National Unification were adopted, and the period of mobilization for the suppression of Communist rebellion was terminated. Seeking to negotiate with China on operational issues without affirming the other side's legitimacy, the ROC government created the Straits Exchange Foundation (SEF), a nominally non-governmental institution directly led by the Mainland Affairs Council (MAC), an instrument of the Executive Yuan in 1991. The PRC established the Association for Relations Across the Taiwan Straits (ARATS), directly led by the Taiwan Affairs Office of the State Council. This system, described as "white gloves", allowed the two governments to engage with each other on a semi-official basis without compromising their respective sovereignty policies.

On 1 August 1992, the ROC's National Unification Council passed the "Definition of One China Resolution," stating: "The two sides of the Taiwan Strait uphold the One China principle, but the interpretations of the two sides are different ... Our side believes that one China should mean the Republic of China, established in 1912 and existing today, and its sovereignty extends throughout China, but its current governing authority is only over Taiwan, Penghu, Kinmen, and Matzu. Admittedly, Taiwan is part of China, but the mainland is also a part of China."

This resolution became the basis for quasi-governmental negotiations between SEF and ARATS from October to November 1992. Led by Koo Chen-fu and Wang Daohan, these talks culminated in the 1993 Wang–Koo summit. Both sides agreed to confer ambiguity on questions of sovereignty in order to engage on operational questions affecting both sides. The ambiguity of the 1992 Consensus allowed the PRC to emphasize that both sides of the strait upheld the position of one China and allowed the ROC to emphasize that it was the one China to which both the mainland and Taiwan belonged. This facilitated the improvement of cross-strait relations in the early 1990s.

Nonetheless, the rhetoric of ROC President Lee Teng-hui increasingly leaned towards advocating Taiwan independence. Prior to the 1990s, the ROC had been a one-party authoritarian state committed to eventual unification with China. However, democratic reforms reshaped attitudes of the general public, which in turn began influencing policy in Taiwan. As a result, the ROC government shifted away from its commitment to One China and towards a separate political identity for Taiwan. In 1993, Taiwan applied to rejoin the United Nations, while China responded by issuing its first white paper on the Taiwan issue, reaffirming its sovereignty over the island.

In January 1995, CCP General Secretary Jiang Zemin announced the PRC's "Eight-Point Proposal" discussing a gradual process of cross-strait rapprochement and negotiation leading to eventual unification. The Eight-Point Proposal emphasized maintaining the status quo, facilitating economic exchanges and the Three Links, and seeking to deter Taiwan from separating from the mainland. As long as Taiwan was committed to the One China principle, than the PRC stated that it would consider Taiwan concerns like renouncing the use of force or treating the Taipei government as an equal political entity.

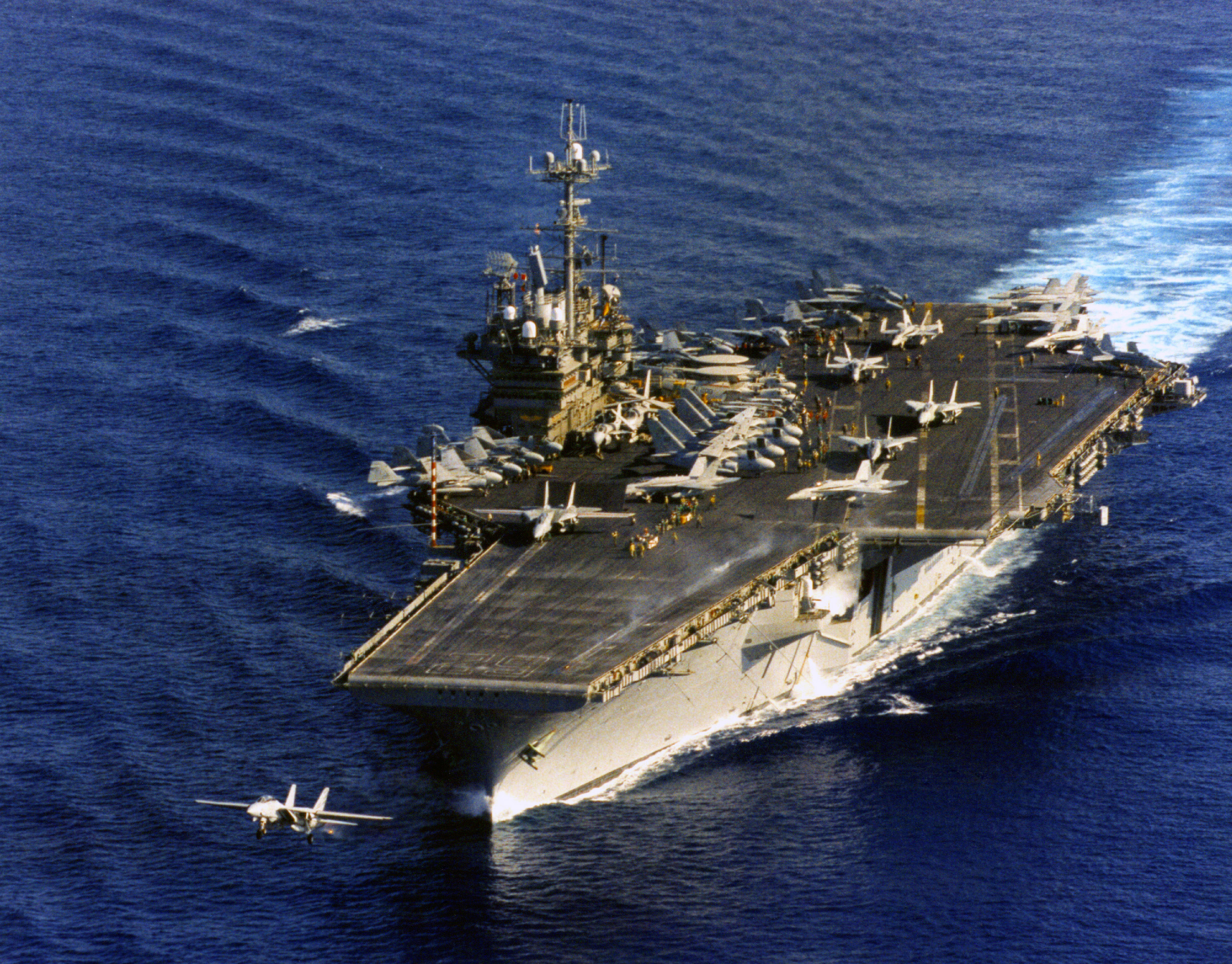
USS Independence underway during the Third Taiwan Strait Crisis

In June 1995, Lee visited the United States and delivered a speech to an invited audience at Cornell University. In response to Taiwan's diplomatic moves, the PRC postponed the second Wang–Koo summit indefinitely. The PLA attempted to influence the 1996 Taiwanese presidential election by conducting a missile exercise, leading to the Third Taiwan Strait Crisis. Following the crisis and the growing influence of a pro-independence element in Taiwan politics, the PRC increased its focus on modernizing its military to deter Taiwan independence and deter U.S.-involvement.

In May 1998, the Central Committee of the Chinese Communist Party convened a Work Conference on Taiwan Affairs which stated that the whole party and the whole nation should work together for peaceful unification. The next month, the ARATS and the SEF resumed contact and the second Wang–Koo summit was held in Shanghai, China. Jiang also received the Taiwanese representatives in Beijing.

=== Hostile non-contact (1999–2008) ===
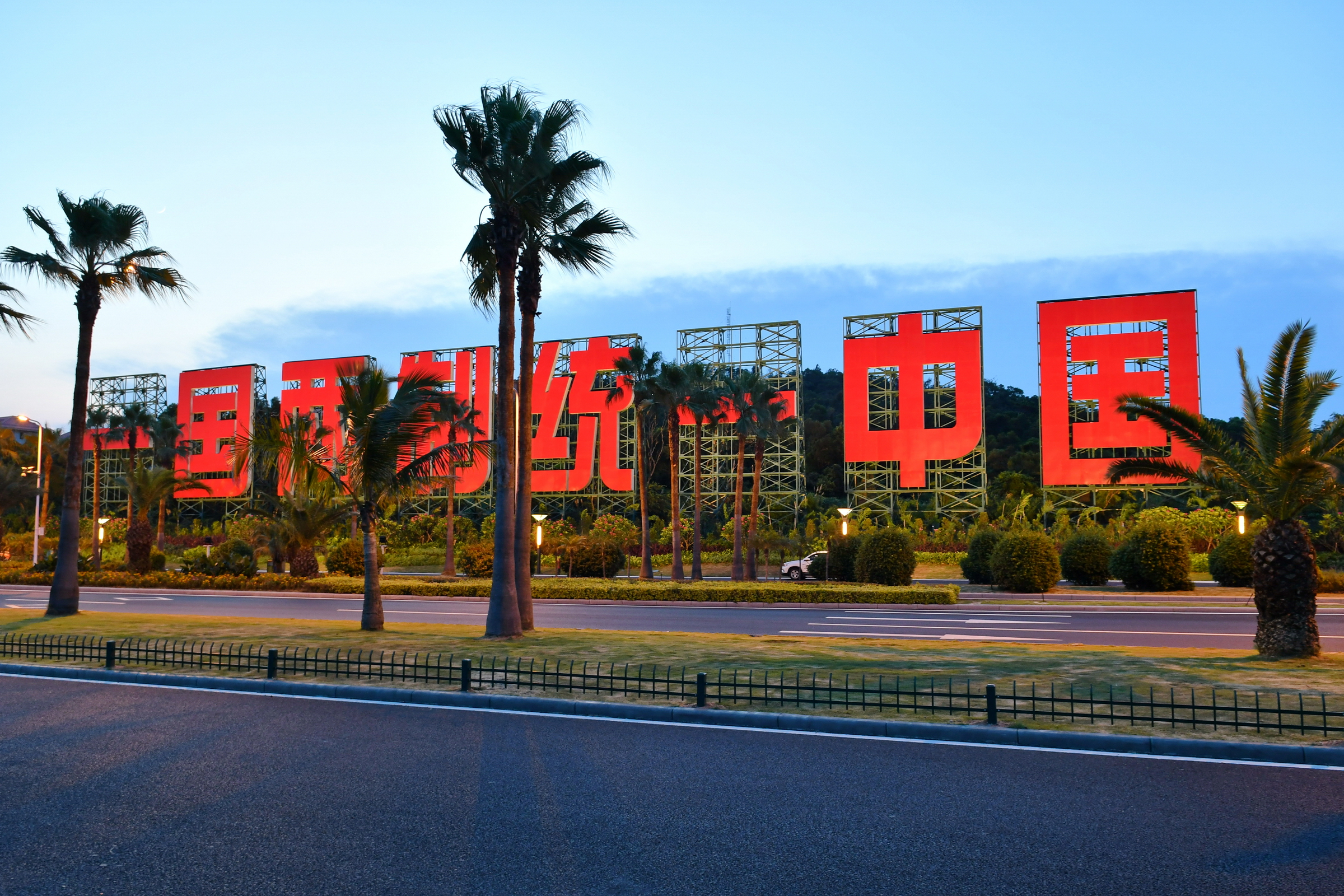
A slogan promoting "one country, two systems" has stood along the coastline of Xiamen since 1999.

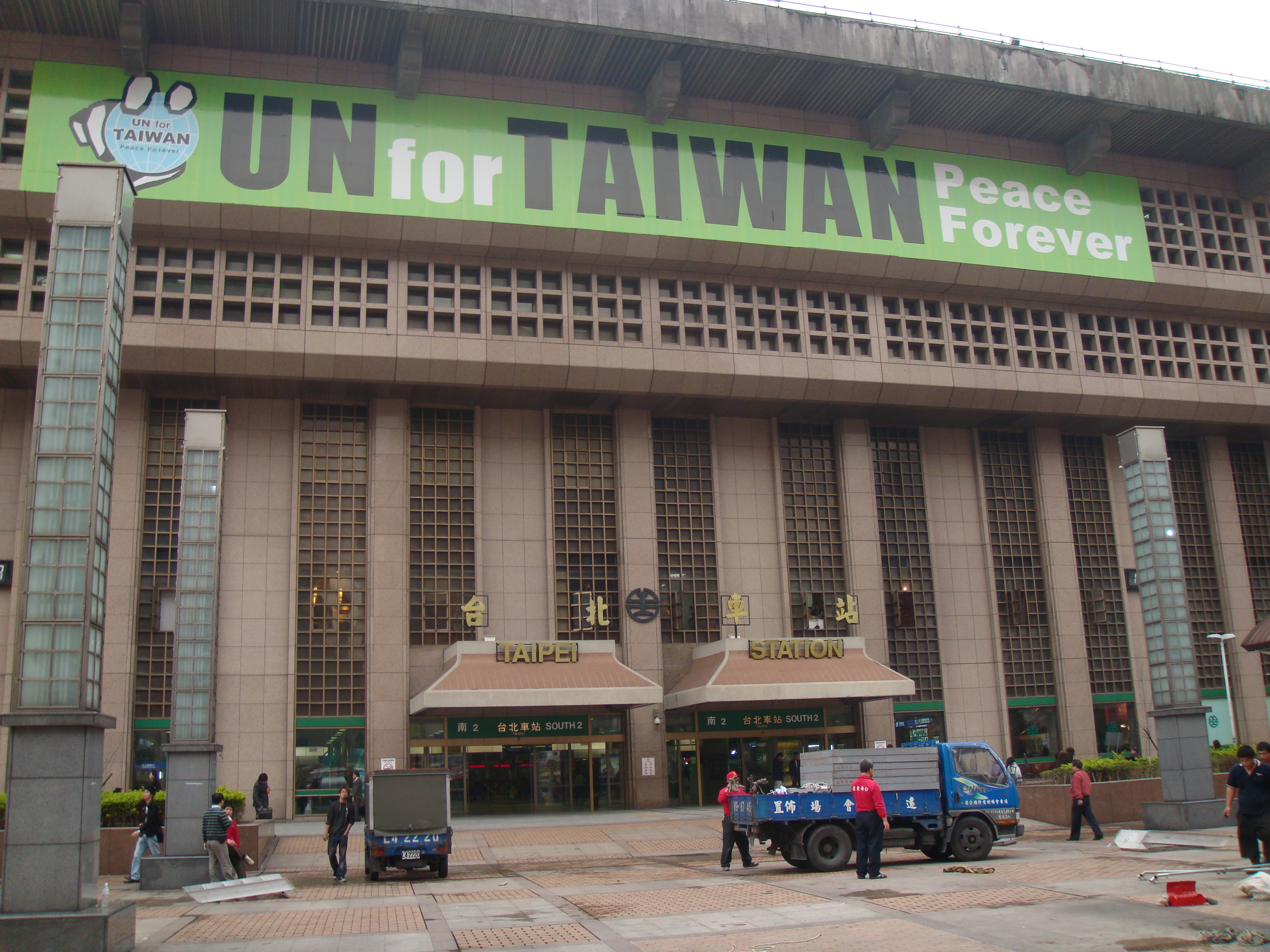
A "UN for Taiwan" banner at Taipei Railway Station in 2008

While Wang Daohan's return visit to Taiwan was scheduled, Lee Teng-hui described cross-strait relations as "state-to-state or at least special state-to-state relations" in July 1999. PRC leadership interpreted Lee's statement as a sign that Taiwan would take steps toward independence. Lee's two-states theory postponed Wang's visit indefinitely and the PRC issued a white paper entitled "The One-China Principle and the Taiwan Issue" in February 2000, before the 2000 Taiwanese presidential election. In the white paper, the PRC warned against conduct it would view as separatism and stated that the PRC would consider the use of force if Taiwan sought to indefinitely avoid meaningful talks with the PRC.

Chen Shui-bian of the pro-independence Democratic Progressive Party (DPP) was elected President of the ROC in 2000. Before the KMT handed over power to the DPP, chairman of the Mainland Affairs Council Su Chi suggested a new term 1992 Consensus as a common point that was acceptable to both sides so that Taiwan and China could keep up cross-strait exchanges. Chen expressed some willingness to accept the 1992 Consensus, but backed down after backlash within his own party. In his inaugural speech, Chen Shui-bian pledged to the Four Noes and One Without, in particular, promising to seek neither independence nor unification as well as rejecting the concept of special state-to-state relations expressed by his predecessor, Lee Teng-hui, as well as establishing the Mini-three Links. Furthermore, he pursued a policy of normalizing economic relations with the PRC. The PRC did not engage Chen's administration, but meanwhile in 2001 Chen lifted the 50-year ban on direct trade and investment with the PRC. In November 2001, Chen repudiated "One China" and called for talks without preconditions. On 3 August 2002, Chen defined the cross-strait relations as One Country on Each Side (namely, that China and Taiwan are two different countries). The PRC subsequently cut off official contact with the ROC government. Certain cross-strait affairs transitioned into a non-governmental negotiation model, such as the talks held in Macau regarding direct cross-strait charter flights for Taiwanese businessmen during the Chinese New Year.

Hu Jintao became General Secretary of the Chinese Communist Party in late 2002, succeeding Jiang as top leader of the PRC. Hu urged Taiwan's DPP administration to resume cross-strait dialogue on the basis of the 1992 Consensus. China continued its military build-up against Taiwan and pursued a vigorous policy of isolating Taiwan diplomatically. After the re-election of Chen Shui-bian in 2004, China issued a statement before Chen's inaugural speech, indicating that preventing Taiwan's de jure independence was the top priority of Beijing's Taiwan policy. In March 2005, the 10th National People's Congress passed the Anti-Secession Law, which authorized military action if Taiwan were to declare formal independence.

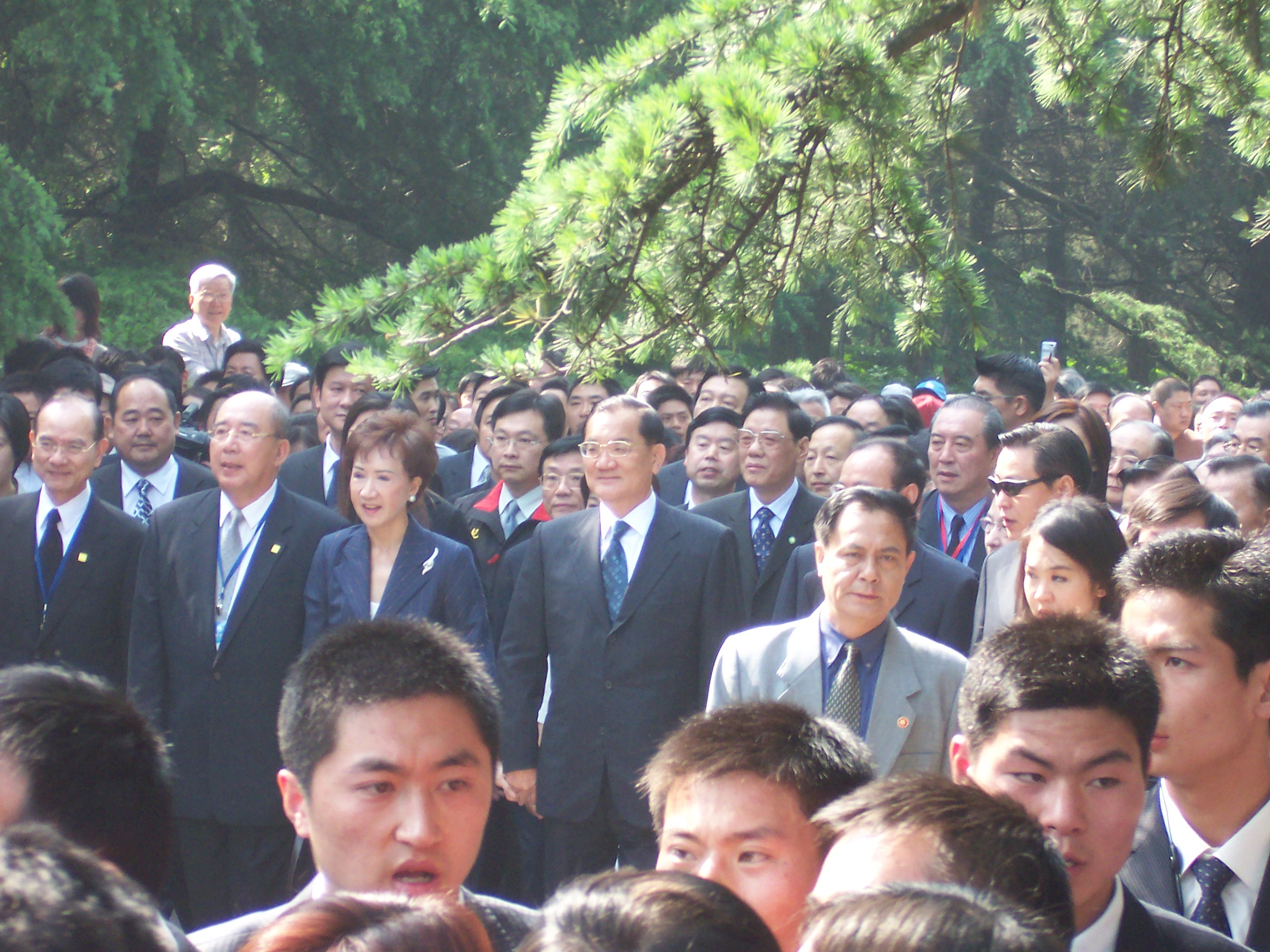
Lien Chan touring the Sun Yat-sen Mausoleum with the Kuomintang delegation to mainland China in 2005

Meanwhile, the PRC administration sought to engage with apolitical or politically non-independence-leaning groups in Taiwan. The CCP increased contacts on a party-to-party basis with the KMT, then the opposition party in Taiwan, due to their support for the 1992 Consensus. The increased contacts culminated in the 2005 Pan-Blue visits to China, including a meeting between Hu and then-KMT chairman Lien Chan in April 2005. It was the first meeting between the leaders of the two parties since the end of the Chinese Civil War in 1949. The KMT and the CCP also initiated the KMT-CCP Forum the following year as a communication channel.

=== Resumption of high level contact (2008–2016) ===
In 2008, the KMT won a large majority in the legislative election and its candidate Ma Ying-jeou won the following Taiwanese presidential election on 22 March. Ma advocated that cross-strait relations should shift from "mutual non-recognition" to "mutual non-denial". He stated that the relations are neither between two Chinas nor two states. It is a special relationship. Cross-strait cooperation increased during Ma's tenure. During Ma's administration, the two sides signed 23 agreements and held eleven high-level talks.

Both Hu Jintao and his new counterpart, Ma Ying-jeou, considered the 1992 Consensus to be the basis for negotiations between the two sides of the Taiwan Strait. On 26 March 2008, Hu Jintao held a telephone talk with the U.S. President George W. Bush, in which he explained that the "1992 Consensus" shows that "both sides recognize there is only one China, but agree to differ on its definition". There followed a series of meetings between the two sides. On 12 April 2008, Hu Jintao held a meeting with ROC's then vice-president elect Vincent Siew as chairman of the Cross-Straits Common Market Foundation during the Boao Forum for Asia. On 28 May 2008, Hu met with the KMT chairman Wu Po-hsiung, the first meeting between the heads of the CCP and the KMT as ruling parties. During this meeting, Hu and Wu agreed that both sides should recommence semi-official dialogue under the 1992 Consensus.

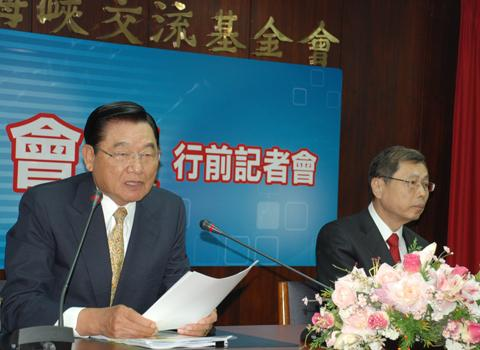
Chiang Pin-kung (left) represented the SEF at the Chen–Chiang Summit in October 2011.

Cross-strait high-level talks between the ARATS and the SEF reopened in June 2008, with the first meeting held in Beijing. On 13 June, Chen Yunlin, President of the ARATS, and Chiang Pin-kung, President of the SEF, signed agreements stating that direct charter flights between the two sides would begin, and that Taiwan would allow the entry of up to 3,000 visitors from China daily. After Chen and Chiang's second meeting, the first direct flights and shipments began on 15 December 2008. On 31 December 2008, Hu Jintao made six proposals on cross-strait relations, stating that both sides of the strait should "make pragmatic explorations in their political relations under the special circumstances where the country has not yet been unified."

The financial relationship between the two areas improved in 2009 when the ROC's financial regulator, the Financial Supervisory Commission, announced that Chinese investors would be permitted to invest in Taiwan's money markets for the first time since 1949. Investors could apply to purchase Taiwan shares, provided that their holdings did not exceed one-tenth of the value of the firm's total shares. In 2010, the Economic Cooperation Framework Agreement (ECFA) removed tariffs on hundreds of products. While the deal favored Taiwan, Beijing hoped to gain political advantages in its long-standing unification campaign.

As Taiwan's risk factor as a flashpoint has significantly decreased in relation to China, a 2010 report from Taiwan's Ministry of National Defense stated that China's charm offensive is only accommodating on issues that do not undermine its claim to Taiwan. The report also warned that the PRC would invade if Taiwan declared independence, developed weapons of mass destruction, or suffered from civil chaos. President Ma has repeatedly called for the PRC to dismantle the missile batteries targeting Taiwan's cities. Additionally, Ma has urged the PRC to embrace Sun Yat-sen's call for freedom and democracy.

In 2012, Ma Ying-jeou won his second presidential election, and the KMT maintained its majority in Taiwan's legislature. In the same year, Xi Jinping succeeded Hu Jintao as General Secretary of the Chinese Communist Party, as well as the PRC top leader. Xi continued Hu's Taiwan policy, and offered 31 new measures to improve Taiwan's economic integration with the mainland in June 2013. The Cross-Strait Service Trade Agreement (CSSTA) was signed in Shanghai during the ninth cross-strait high-level talks, opening the service sectors on both sides to further exchanges. Xi further expressed his intention regarding Taiwan when he met Taiwan's former vice president, Vincent Siew, at the 2013 APEC summit, stating that these issues cannot be passed on from generation to generation.

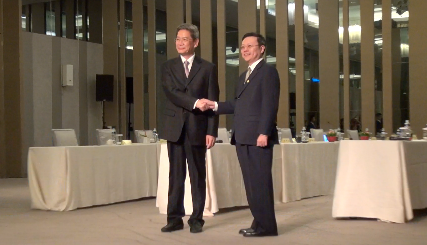
2014 Wang-Zhang Meeting in Taiwan

While Xi met with Siew at the summit, Wang Yu-chi, Minister of the Mainland Affairs Council, spoke with Zhang Zhijun, Minister of the Taiwan Affairs Office, with each addressing the other by his official title. Both called for the establishment of a regular dialogue mechanism between their two agencies. The two ministers met in Nanjing on 11 February 2014, making the first official, high-level, government-to-government contact between the two sides since 1949. Zhang visited Taiwan from 25 to 28 June 2014, becoming the first ministerial-level PRC official to do so.

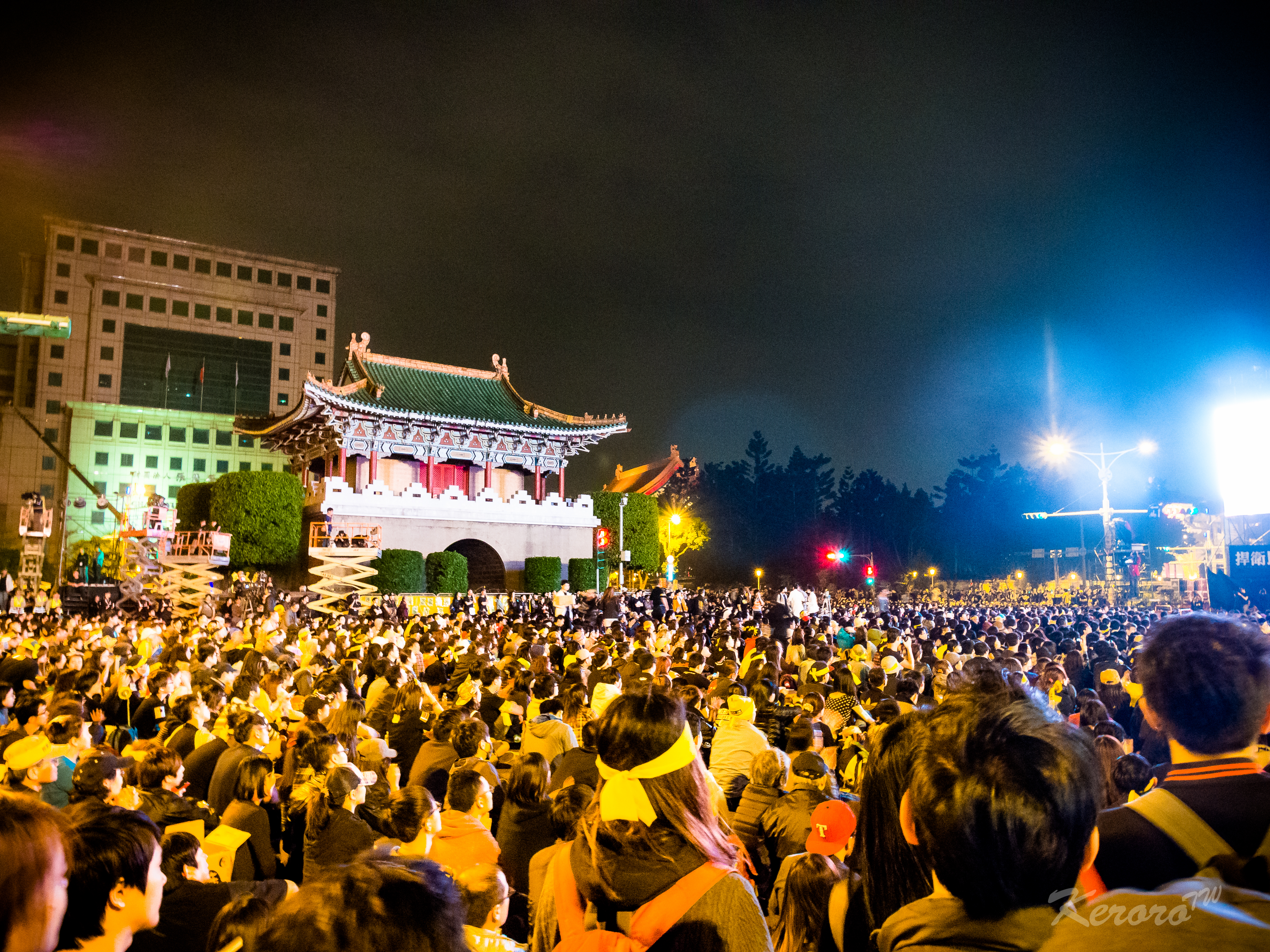
Sunflower Student Movement against the CSSTA in Taipei

At the same time that official talks between the two sides began, the CSSTA, awaiting review by the Legislative Yuan, faced internal opposition in Taiwan, which ultimately led to the outbreak of the Sunflower Student Movement. Citizens occupied the Legislative Yuan for 23 days, protesting against the ruling KMT's attempt to push the CSSTA through. The protesters felt that the trade pact with China would leave Taiwan vulnerable to political pressure from Beijing. In the end, the agreement was not ratified by the legislature. Subsequent talks on other cross-strait trade agreements were suspended. In September 2014, Xi Jinping adopted a more uncompromising stance than his predecessors, calling for the "one country, two systems" model to be applied to Taiwan. It was noted that the model had not been mentioned by the PRC for quite some time. Taiwan's ruling KMT later suffered a historic defeat in the 2014 Taiwanese local elections.

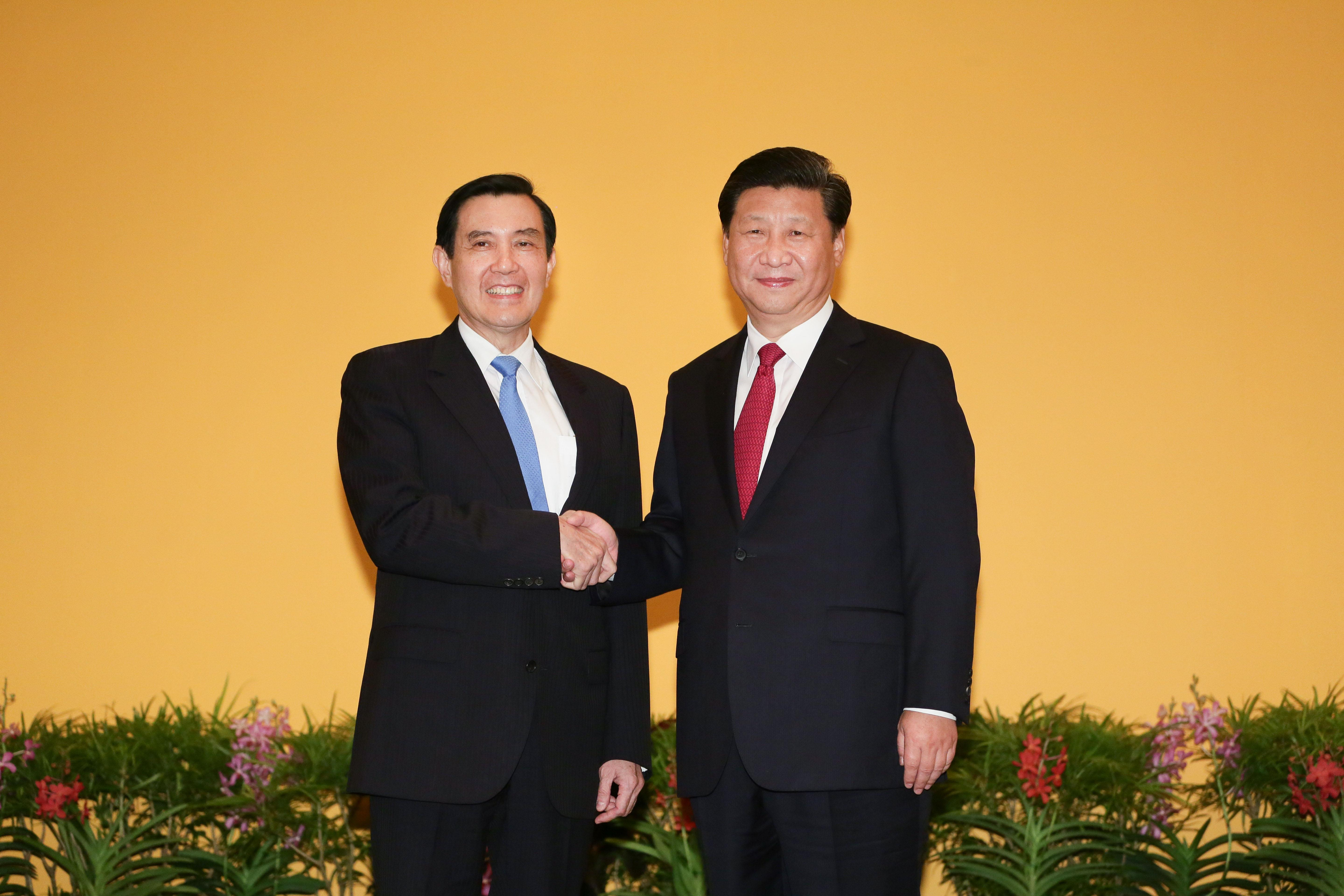
2015 Ma–Xi meeting in Singapore

With the prospect of Taiwan's DPP taking control of the presidency and legislature in the upcoming 2016 elections, Ma and Xi met on 7 November 2015 in Singapore, marking the first meeting between leaders of the two sides since the end of the Chinese Civil War in 1949. They met within their capacity as "Leader of Mainland China" and "Leader of Taiwan" respectively and addressed each other as "mister". No major agreements were reached on the occasion, however, a hotline connecting the head of the Mainland Affairs Council and the head of the Taiwan Affairs Office was established at the end of 2015.

=== Deteriorating relations (2016–present) ===
In the 2016 Taiwanese general elections, Tsai Ing-wen and the DPP captured landslide victories. Tsai initially pursued a similar strategy as Chen Shui-bian, but after winning the election she received a similarly frosty reception from the PRC. On 12 March 2016, Xi stated that the 1992 Consensus was "the greatest common denominator and political bottom line for the peaceful development of cross-strait relations".

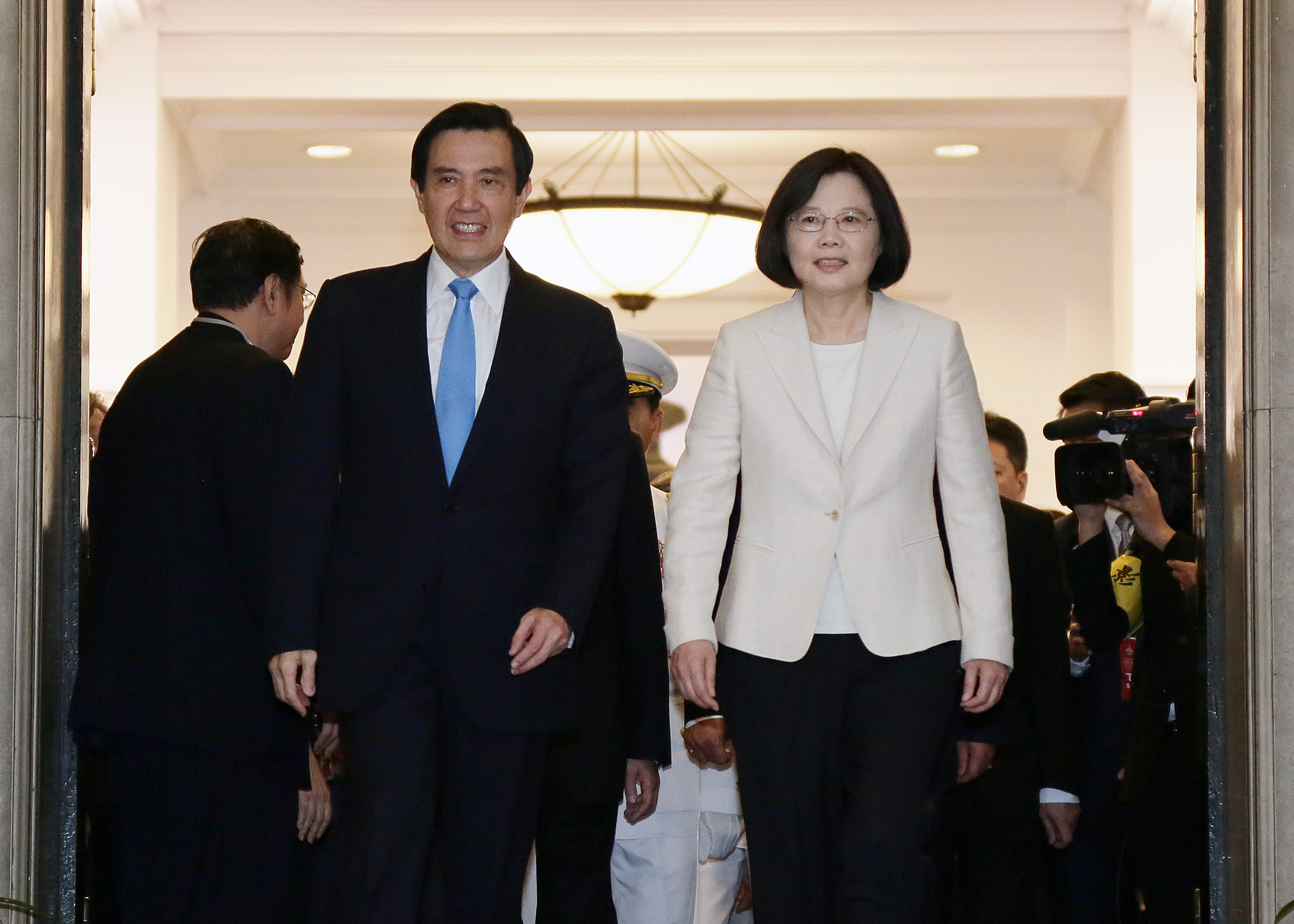
Tsai Ing-wen succeeded Ma Ying-jeou as the ROC President in May 2016.

In her inauguration speech, President Tsai acknowledged that the talks surrounding the 1992 Consensus took place without agreeing that a consensus was reached. She credited the talks with spurring 20 years of dialogue and exchange between the two sides. She hoped that exchanges would continue on the basis of these historical facts, as well as the existence of the Republic of China's constitutional system and the democratic will of the Taiwanese people. In response, Beijing called Tsai's answer an "incomplete test paper" because Tsai did not agree to the content of the 1992 Consensus. On 25 June 2016, Beijing suspended official cross-strait communications, with any remaining cross-strait exchanges thereafter taking place through unofficial channels.

The Tsai administration blocked former President Ma Ying-jeou from visiting Hong Kong, but eight non-DPP magistrates and mayors from Taiwan visited Beijing in 2016. Their visit aimed to reset and restart cross-strait relations after Tsai took office. The eight local leaders reiterated their support for One China under the 1992 Consensus. In response, Tsai presented the "New Four Noes" in her first National Day speech, stating that "our pledges will not change, and our goodwill will not change; but we will not bow to pressure, and we will of course not revert to the old path of confrontation".

In October 2017, Tsai Ing-wen expressed hopes that both sides would restart their cross-strait relations after the 19th National Congress of the Chinese Communist Party, and argued that new practices and guidelines governing mutual interaction should be examined. However, Xi Jinping emphasized the PRC's sovereignty over Taiwan in his opening speech at the 19th National Congress. At the same time, he offered the chance for open talks and "unobstructed exchanges" with Taiwan as long as the government moved to accept the 1992 Consensus. Xi stated that people from Taiwan could receive national treatment in pursuing careers on the mainland and in February 2018 the PRC government announced 31 preferential policies for Taiwan people on matters of industry, finance, taxation, land use, employment, education, and health care. Among other measures, beginning 1 September 2018 Taiwan people who live on the mainland for six months and have stable jobs are eligible to obtain residence permits. By the end of February 2018, 24 provinces and 72 cities had introduced preferential policies for people from Taiwan.

Beginning in the mid-to-late 2010s, Beijing has significantly restricted the number of Chinese tour groups allowed to visit Taiwan in order to place pressure upon President Tsai Ing-wen. During Tsai's first presidential term, seven countries shifted their diplomatic recognition to the PRC. The People's Liberation Army Air Force conducted circumnavigations around Taiwan, strengthening the PLA's conventional strategic deterrence. China was also accused of conducting hybrid warfare against Taiwan. ROC political leaders, including President Tsai and Premier Lai Ching-te, as well as international media outlets, have repeatedly accused the PRC of spreading fake news via social media to create divisions in Taiwanese society and influence voters.

In a January 2019 speech commemorating the 40th anniversary of the "Message to Compatriots in Taiwan," Xi Jinping called for "peaceful reunification with Taiwan" in accordance with the "One China principle" and the 1992 Consensus. In Xi's view, the Taiwan issue emerged from China's weakness dating back to the Opium Wars and after World War II, the "two sides of the Taiwan straits fell into a special state of protracted political confrontation due to the civil war in China and the interferences of foreign forces."

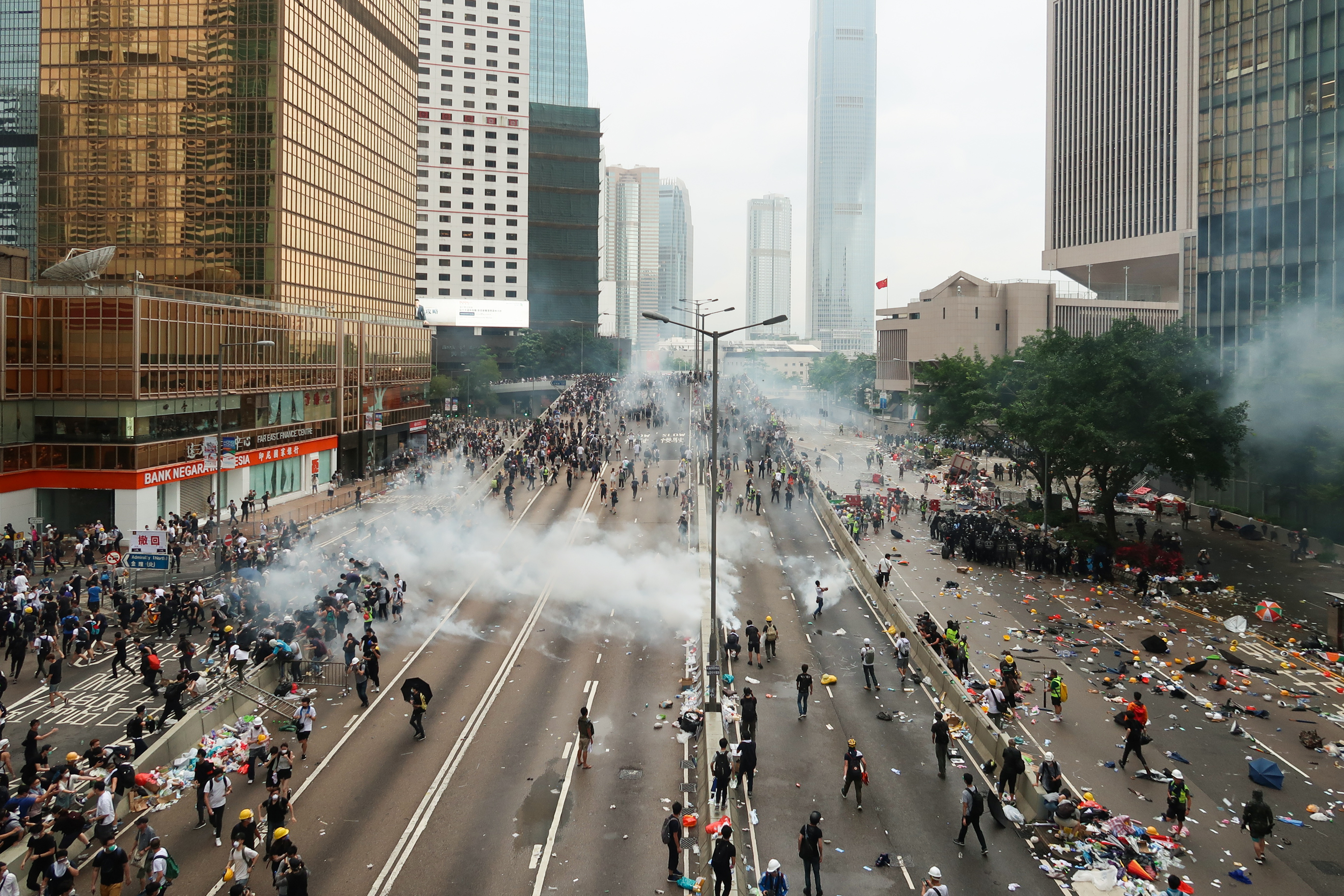
The Hong Kong protests were considered a contributing factor in the 2020 Taiwanese elections

In response, Tsai emphasized that she has never accepted the 1992 Consensus. Tsai made a shift from not publicly accepting the 1992 Consensus to directly rejecting it, stating that there's no need to talk about the 1992 Consensus anymore, because this term has already been defined by Beijing as "one country, two systems." Tsai, who supported the 2019–2020 Hong Kong protests, pledged that as long as she is Taiwan's president, she will never accept the "one country, two systems." In January 2020, re-elected Tsai Ing-wen argued that Taiwan already was an independent country called the "Republic of China (Taiwan)", further arguing that the mainland Chinese authorities had to recognize that situation.

The Taiwanese public turned further against mainland China, due to fallout from the Hong Kong protests and also due to the PRC's continued determination to keep the ROC out of the World Health Organization during the COVID-19 pandemic. The opposition KMT also appeared to distance itself from China in 2020, stating it would review its unpopular advocacy of closer ties with the PRC. In March 2021, KMT chairman Johnny Chiang rejected "one country, two systems" as a feasible model for Taiwan, citing Beijing's response to protests in Hong Kong as well as the value that Taiwanese place in political freedoms.

The Hong Kong Economic, Trade and Cultural Office in Taiwan suspended its operation indefinitely in 2021, followed by the Macau Economic and Cultural Office. In October 2021, Tsai stated her "four commitments" in a National Day speech, including that the Republic of China and the People's Republic of China should not be subordinate to each other. The PRC denounced Tsai's speech as "incited confrontation and distorted facts", and added that seeking Taiwanese independence was closing doors to dialogue. Following a ban on the importation of pineapples from Taiwan and wax apples in 2021, the Chinese government banned the import of grouper fish in June 2022, claiming they had found banned chemicals and excessive levels of other substances.

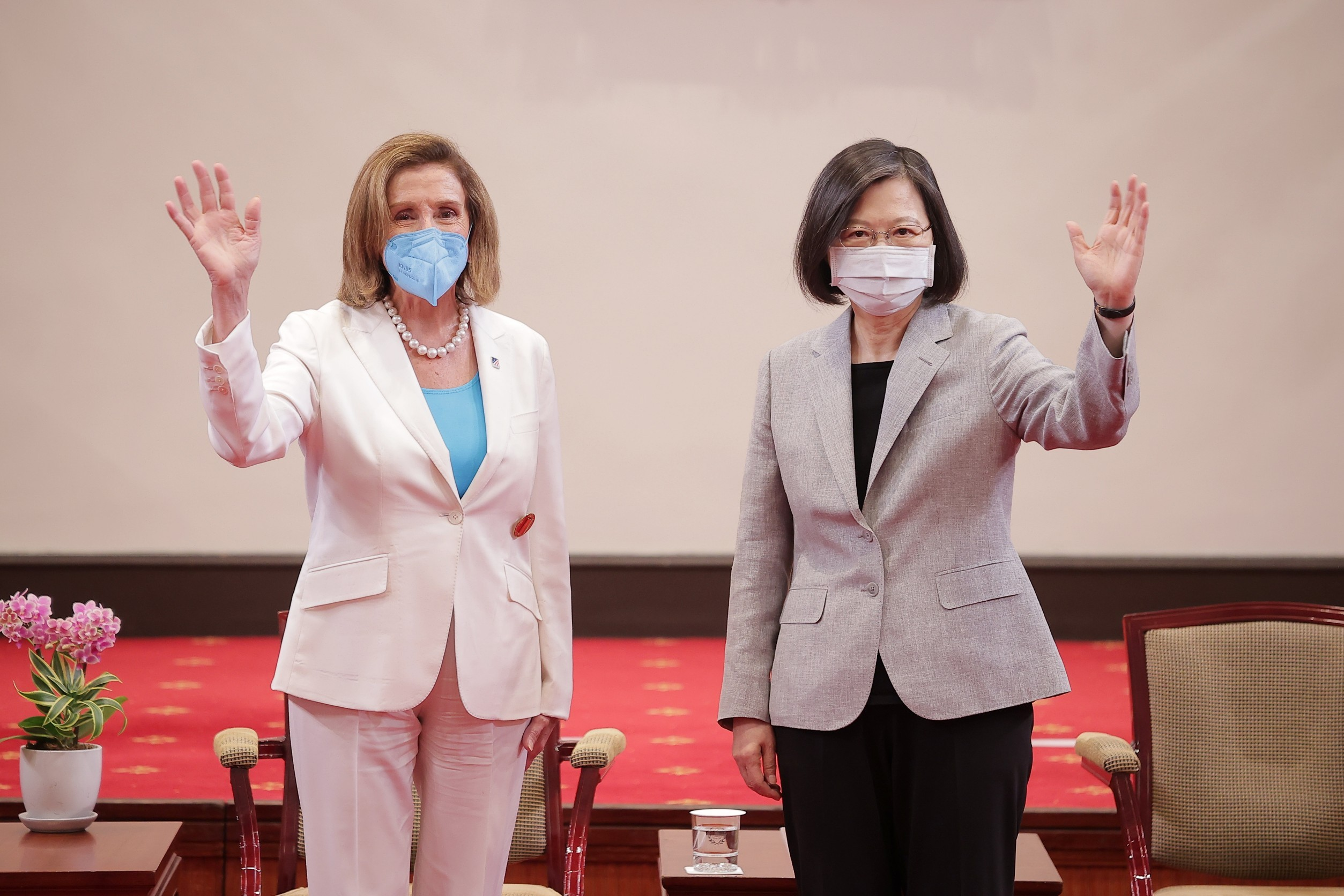
ROC President Tsai Ing-wen with U.S. House Speaker Nancy Pelosi on 3 August 2022

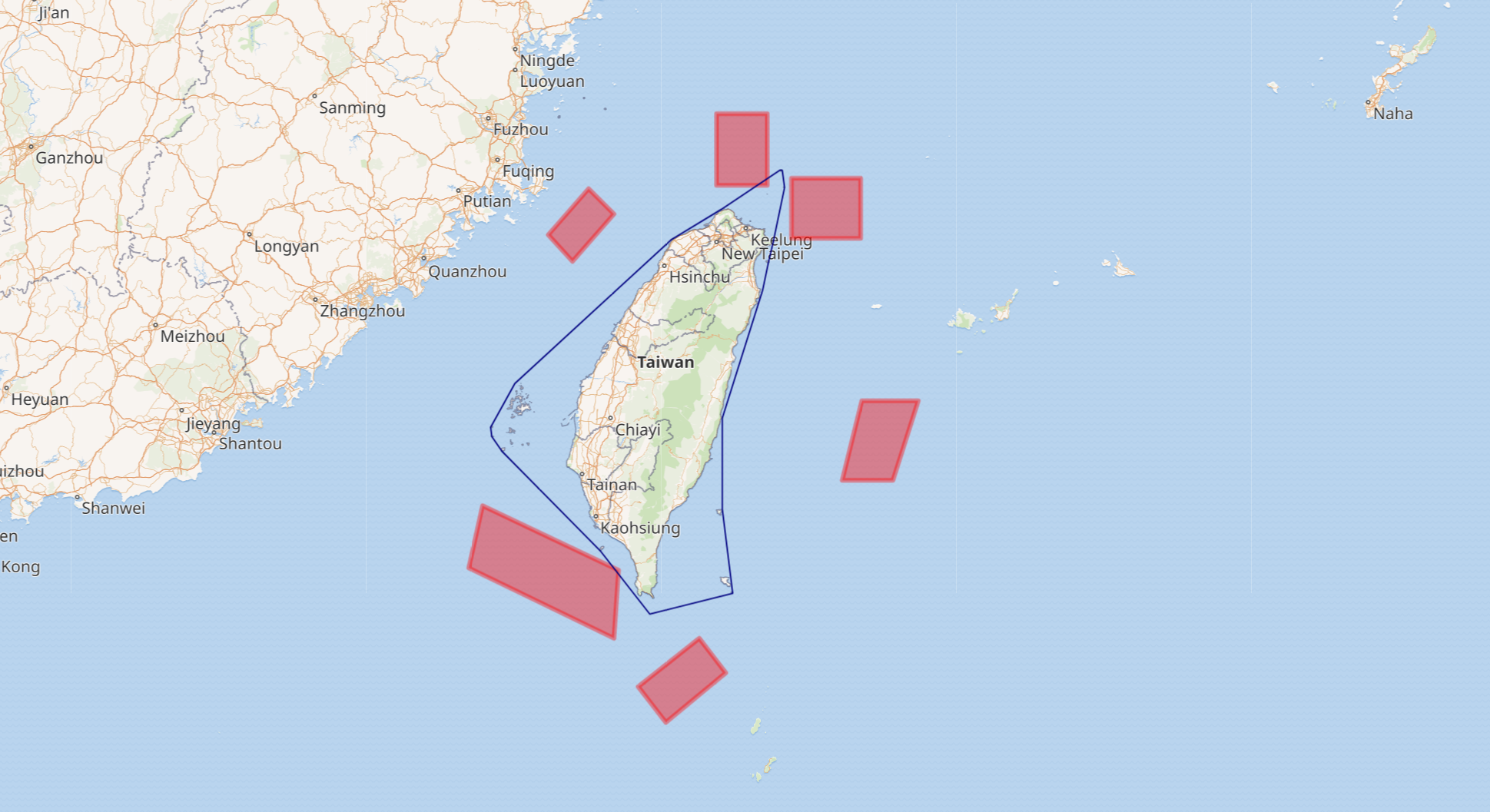
China has conducted several large-scale military drills around Taiwan annually since 2022 Military zones of the 2022 military exercises Territorial sea baseline of Taiwan

On 2 August 2022, U.S. House Speaker Nancy Pelosi visited Taiwan, which China viewed as a violation of its sovereignty. In response, the PLA conducted unprecedented live-fire drills from 4 August in six zones around Taiwan, involving live ammunition, air assets, naval forces, and firing ballistic missiles near and over Taiwan. This marked the beginning of the Fourth Taiwan Strait Crisis, and China's biggest escalation in the region since the Third Taiwan Strait Crisis in 1996. Taiwan deployed ships and aircraft, but no military conflict occurred, though tensions escalated. China ended the exercises on 10 August but stated that regular "patrols" would be launched in the Taiwan Strait. China also released its first white paper on Taiwan's status since 2000, once again urging Taiwan to unify under the "one country, two systems" framework, but omitted a previous statement that no troops would be sent to Taiwan after unification. In response, Taiwan's Mainland Affairs Council called the white paper "wishful thinking and disregarding facts."

Another set of Chinese military exercises around Taiwan began on 8 April 2023, after president Tsai visited U.S. Speaker Kevin McCarthy in California. The PRC has described its military exercises as a "stern warning" against "separatist acts".

In June 2023, Wang Huning, the chairman of the Chinese People's Political Consultative Conference, unveiled a plan to transform Fujian province into a demonstration zone for "Taiwan's economic integration into China". Under the plan, the Chinese government would boost economic and transportation cooperation with Taiwan and make it easier for Taiwanese people to live, buy property, access social services and study in Fujian.

Before the 2024 Taiwanese election, China began ending preferential import tariffs under the ECFA. After Lai Ching-te's election, China declared that the DPP could not represent mainstream Taiwanese opinion. Tensions rose following the capsizing of a Chinese motorboat in Kinmen waters, which resulted in two deaths. Upon taking office, Lai stated that the ROC and the PRC are not subordinate to each other, prompting China to conduct military exercises codenamed Joint Sword-2024A. Subsequently, China suspended preferential tariff arrangements on 134 items under the ECFA. In addition, China threatened the death penalty for independence advocates and, in September 2024, sentenced a Taiwanese individual to nine years for "separatism." Four days after Taiwan's National Day in October 2024, China conducted further military exercises named Joint Sword-2024B.

In 2025, in response to rising espionage activity, President Lai announced his intention to reinstate military trials for active-duty personnel and labeled China a "foreign hostile force" under the Anti-Infiltration Act. Meanwhile, Taiwan's judiciary initiated the first prosecution of a Chinese cargo ship captain for deliberately damaging a subsea cable near the Penghu Islands and sentenced four former DPP staffers to six to ten years for spying for China. Taiwan's National Security Bureau reported a 17% increase in Chinese cyberattacks on government systems, averaging 2.8 million daily incidents; China has denied involvement and accused Taiwan of conducting its own cyber operations. Throughout late 2025, various Chinese public security bureaus intensified legal pressure on Taiwanese citizens by launching bounty programs or criminal investigations for alleged secessionist activities, targeting military personnel, a legislator, and online content creators.

Large-scale Chinese military drills continued into 2025, beginning with the launch of Strait Thunder-2025A in April. Following the onset of the China–Japan diplomatic crisis and the announcement of the largest U.S. arms sales to Taiwan, the PLA's Eastern Theater Command announced a major military exercise on 29 December. Codenamed Justice Mission 2025, the maneuvers involved the command's land, sea, air, and rocket forces.

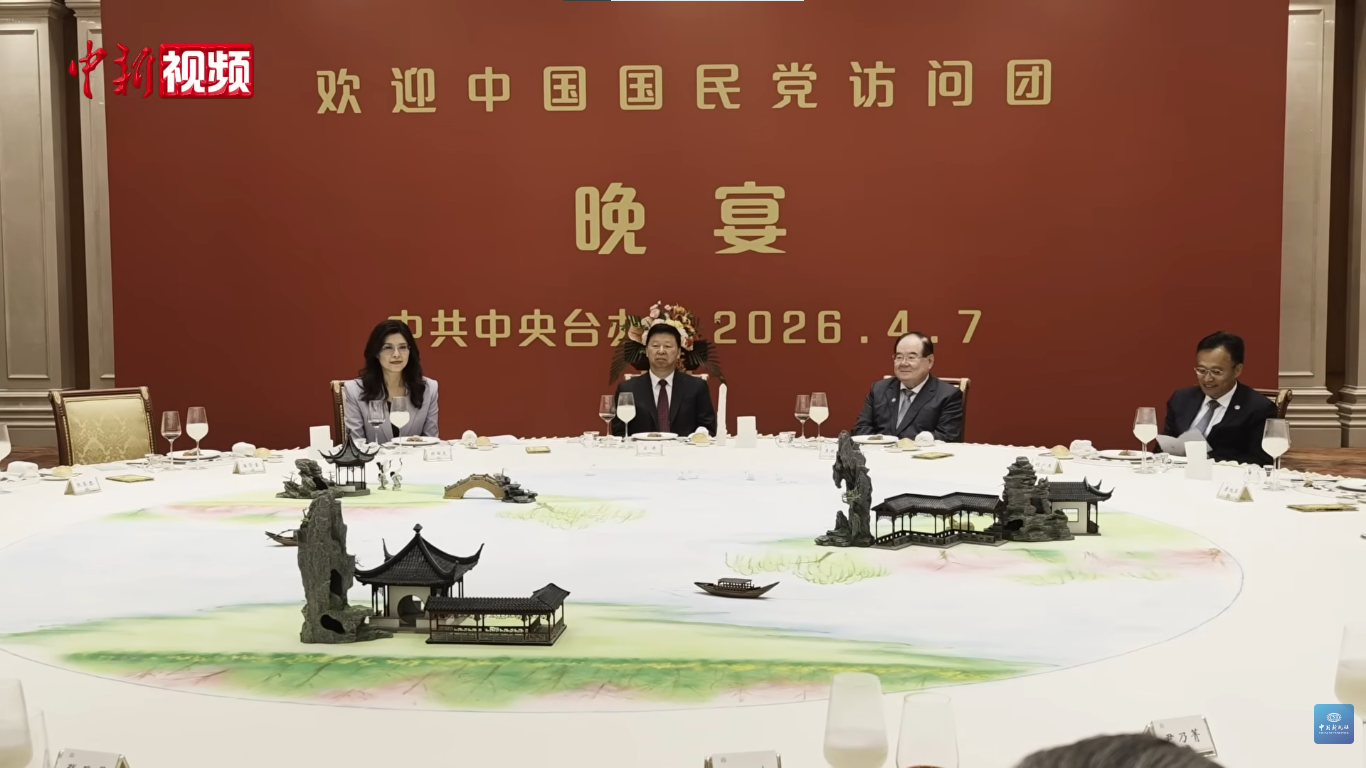
Cheng Li-wun attended a welcome banquet at the Nanjing East Suburb State Guesthouse on 7 April 2026 during her visit to mainland China

In April 2026, in a bid to improve relations, Kuomintang chairwoman Cheng Li-wun visited mainland China and stopped at Nanjing, Shanghai and Beijing. She also met with Xi Jinping, marking the first meeting between the leaders of the KMT and the CCP in nearly ten years. Xi Jinping stated that China and Taiwan should avoid conflict and instead focus on peace and prosperity, also saying that "ties will improve and people of both side will come closer over the time".

In 22–23 April 2026, a planned visit by Lai Ching-te to Eswatini was cancelled after Seychelles, Mauritius, and Madagascar revoked overflight permits. Taiwanese authorities attributed the cancellations to diplomatic pressure from the People's Republic of China, which emphasized the One-China principle and does not recognize Taiwan's presidency. In May 2026, Taiwan President Lai Ching-te visited Eswatini and met King Mswati III, signing trade and cooperation agreements, despite China's efforts to block the trip.

On 12 May 2026, Taiwan's Mainland Affairs Council criticized Beijing for calling Taiwanese media representatives to a cross-strait summit and asking them to report on Taiwan independence activities. On 16 May 2026, Taiwan reiterated that it is a sovereign and independent nation, following U.S. President Donald Trump's caution after his state visit with Chinese President Xi Jinping against formally declaring independence. In July 2026, Taiwanese prosecutors detained an Nvidia employee while investigating the alleged shipment of advanced AI servers with Nvidia chips to China.

== Semi-official relations ==
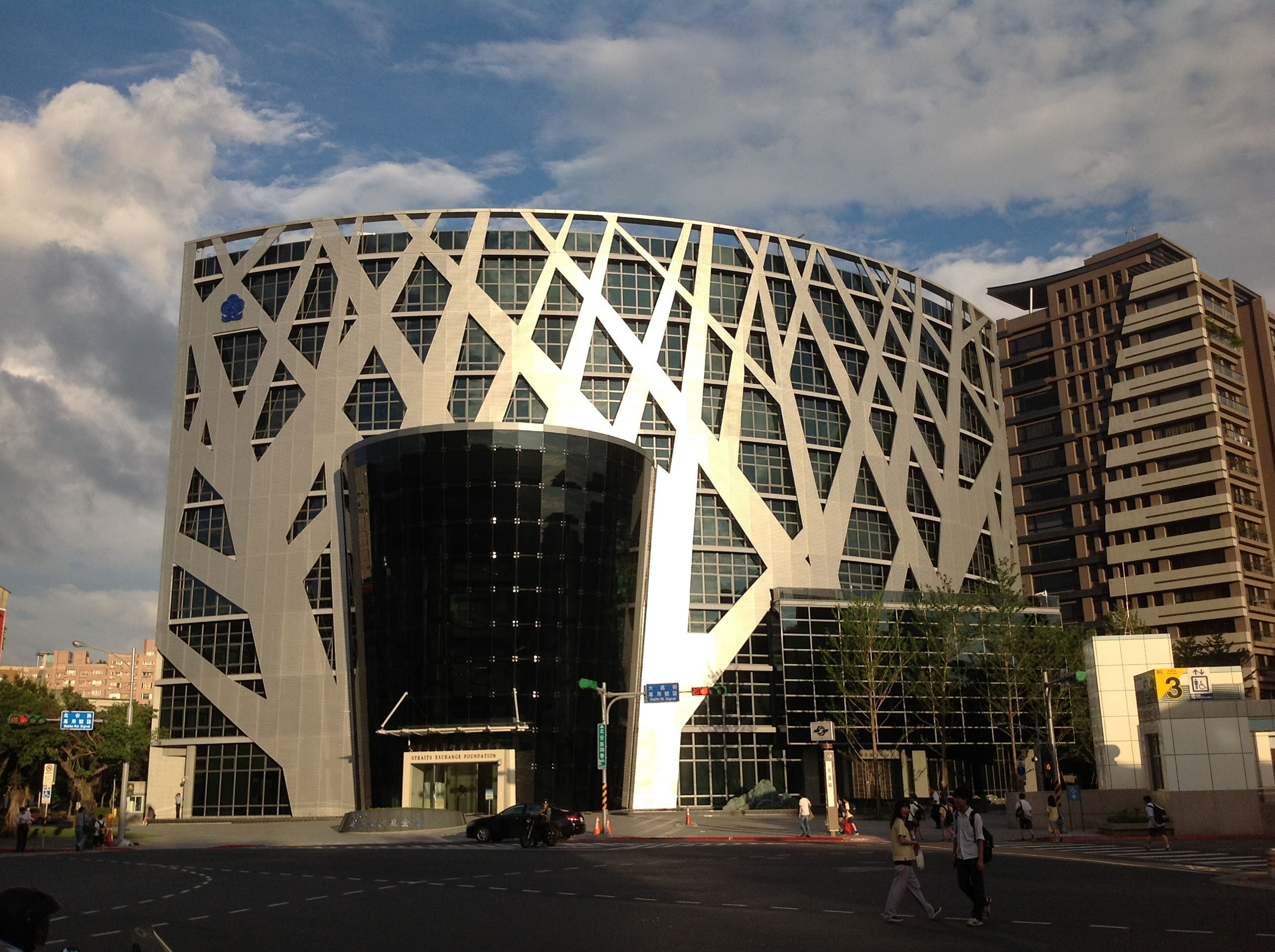
Straits Exchange Foundation headquarter office in Taipei, Taiwan

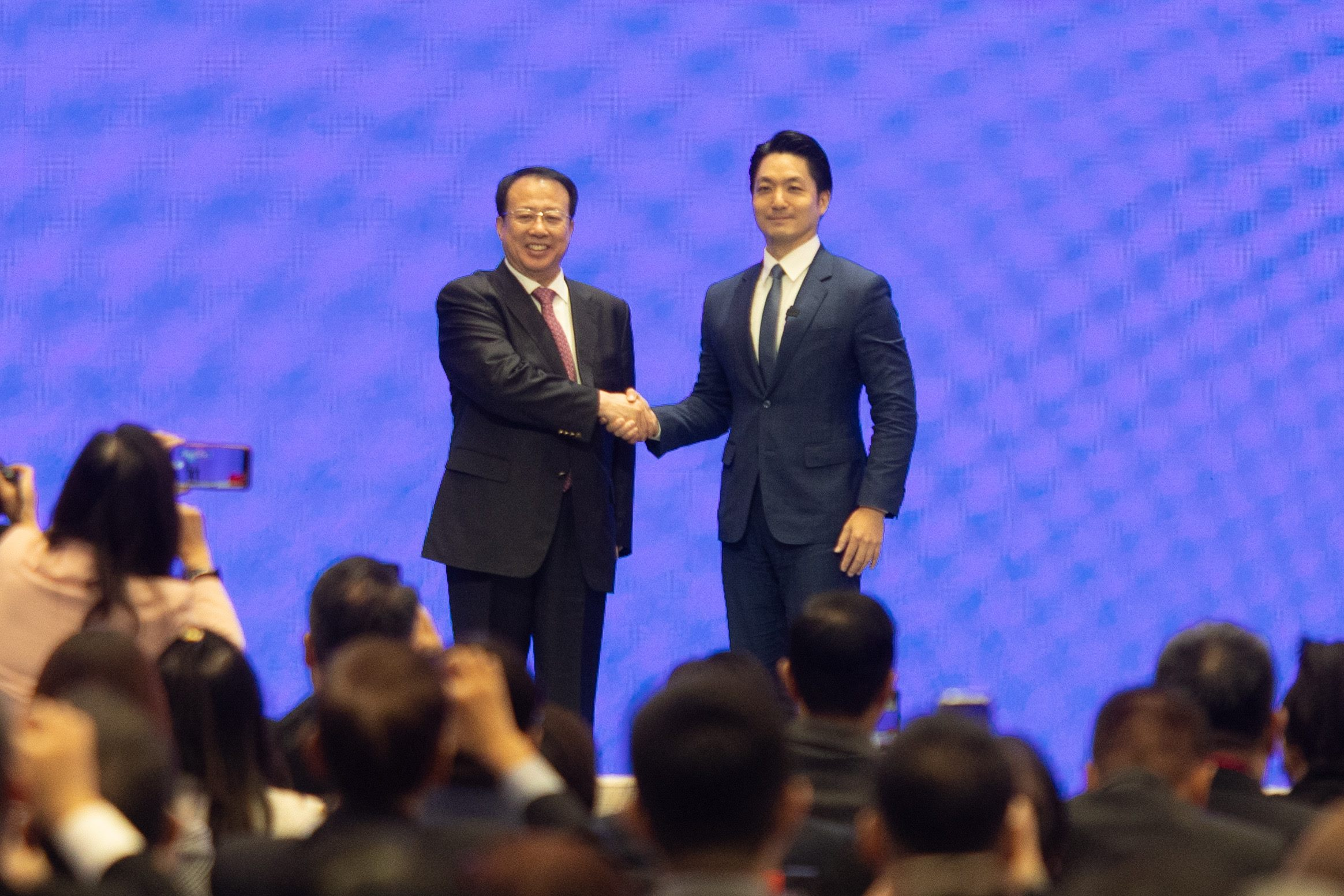
Shanghai mayor Gong Zheng and Taipei mayor Chiang Wan-an shaking hands at the 2025 Shanghai–Taipei City Forum

Semi-governmental contact is maintained through the Straits Exchange Foundation (SEF) and the Association for Relations Across the Taiwan Straits (ARATS). Although formally privately constituted bodies, the SEF and the ARATS are both directly led by the executive governments of each side: the SEF by the Mainland Affairs Council of the ROC's Executive Yuan, and the ARATS by the Taiwan Affairs Office of the PRC's State Council. The heads of the two bodies are both full-time appointees and do not hold other government positions.

Semi-official representative offices between the two sides are the PRC's Cross-Strait Tourism Exchange Association (CSTEA) in Taiwan, and the ROC's Taiwan Strait Tourism Association (TSTA) in China. Both were established in May 2010. However, the duties of these offices are limited only to tourism-related affairs.

The Shanghai–Taipei City Forum is an annual forum between the cities of Shanghai and Taipei. Launched in 2010 by then-Taipei mayor Hau Lung-pin to promote city-to-city exchanges, it led to Shanghai's participation in the Taipei International Flora Exposition end of that year. Both Taipei and Shanghai are the first two cities across the Taiwan Strait that carries out exchanges. The forum proceeded even though Ko Wen-je was the non-KMT mayor of Taipei from 2014 to 2022.

== Transportation ==
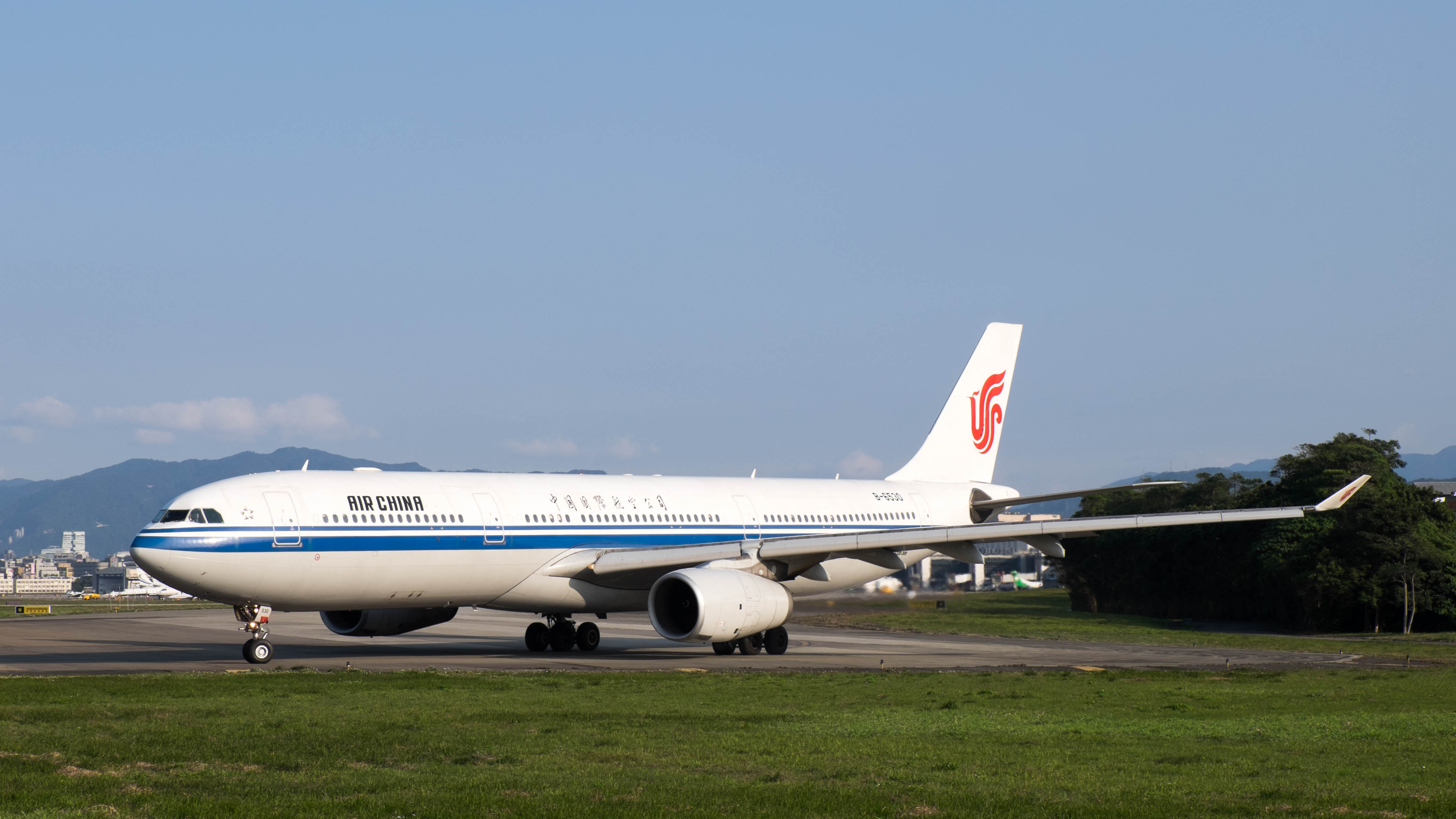
An Air China Airbus A330-300 at Taipei Songshan Airport

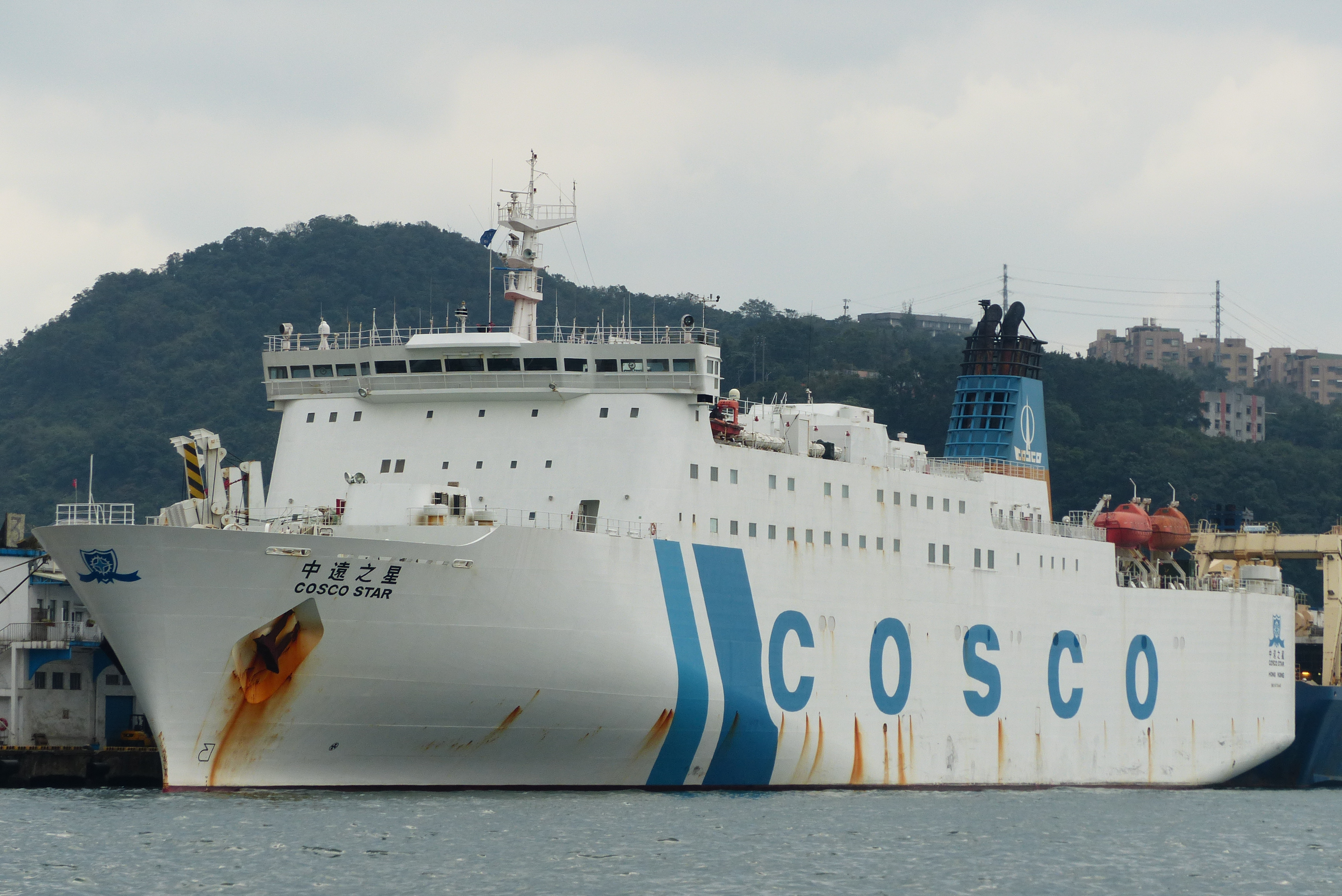
COSCO Star operates direct maritime passenger and cargo roll-on/roll-off services between China and Taiwan

The PRC proposed Three Links to open up postal, transportation and trade links between mainland China and Taiwan. Before 2003, travelers had to make a time-consuming stopover at a third destination, usually Hong Kong or Macau. Cross-strait charter flights during Chinese New Year took off in 2003. However, the charter flights still had to land in Hong Kong. The transportation model was improved in 2005 as the flights had to fly over Hong Kong's flight information region without landing. It was not until 2008 that direct flights and cargo shipments began. As of 2015, 61 mainland Chinese cities are connected with eight airports in Taiwan. The flights operate every day, totaling 890 round-trip flights across the Taiwan Strait per week.

Taiwan residents cannot use the Republic of China passport to travel to mainland China, and mainland China residents cannot use the People's Republic of China passport to travel to Taiwan, as neither the ROC nor the PRC considers this international travel. The PRC government requires Taiwan residents to hold a Mainland Travel Permit for Taiwan Residents when entering mainland China, whereas the ROC government requires mainland Chinese residents to hold the Exit and Entry Permit for the Taiwan Area of the Republic of China to enter the Taiwan Area.

== Economy ==
China is one of Taiwan's most important target for outward foreign direct investment (FDI). From 1991 to 2022, more than US$200 billion has been invested in China by Taiwanese companies, comprising over half of Taiwan's outward FDI annually before 2016. Much of Taiwanese-owned manufacturing, particularly in the electronics sector and the apparel sector, takes place in the PRC, with major companies like TSMC, Foxconn, and UMC establishing subsidiaries there. The investments helped the Taiwanese economy but also propelled China's economic rise.

China is also Taiwan's largest trading partner, accounting for over 20 percent of total trade. China and Hong Kong together account for over 30 percent of Taiwan's exports. In 2022, Taiwan's trade surplus with mainland China and Hong Kong amounted to $100.4 billion. Electronic components, including semiconductor chips, lead in Taiwan's total exports to China.

Neither China nor Taiwan is comfortable with mutual economic dependence, and each government has been driven to seek alternatives. China issued a "Made in China 2025" plan in 2015 to promote manufacturing. On the other hand, Taiwan has tried to reduce its economic reliance on mainland China through its "New Southbound Policy" since 2016. In 2022, Taiwan's total investments in the countries targeted by the policy outstripped investments in China for the first time. The number of Taiwanese working in China, including Hong Kong and Macau, also fell from over 400,000 before the COVID-19 pandemic to 217,000 in 2023.

Since the governments on both sides of the strait do not recognize the other side's legitimacy, there is a lack of legal protection for cross-strait economic exchanges. The Economic Cooperation Framework Agreement (ECFA) was viewed as providing legal protection for investments. In 2014, the Sunflower Student Movement effectively halted the Cross-Strait Service Trade Agreement (CSSTA).

Taiwan rejected China's offer for energy security through "reunification" amid the ongoing West Asian conflict, stating it had secured alternative liquefied natural gas supplies, despite receiving a third of its LNG from Qatar and no energy imports from China.

== Cultural exchanges ==
The National Palace Museum in Taipei and the Palace Museum in Beijing have collaborated on exhibitions. Scholars and academics frequently visit institutions across the Taiwan Strait. Books published on each side are regularly re-published in the other side. However, restrictions on direct imports, different writing systems, and censorship somewhat impede the exchange of books and ideas. Some cultural exchanges are even accused of being associated with China's united front work.

Taiwanese students can apply to universities in the mainland China without taking China's nationwide unified examination, called Gaokao. There are regular programs for school students from each side to visit the other. In 2019, there were 30,000 mainland Chinese and Hong Kong students studying in Taiwan. There were also more than 7,000 Taiwanese students studying in Hong Kong that same year.

Religious exchange has become frequent. Frequent interactions occur between worshipers of Matsu, and also between Buddhists. Taiwan Buddhist organization Tzu Chi is the first overseas non-governmental organization allowed to operate in China.

== Humanitarian actions ==
Both sides have provided humanitarian aid to one another on several occasions. Following the 2008 Sichuan earthquake, an expert search and rescue team was sent from Taiwan to help rescue survivors in Sichuan. Shipments of aid materials were also provided under the coordination of the Red Cross Society of the Republic of China and charities such as Tzu Chi. One year later, China donated prefabricated homes to Taiwan for use by the victims of Typhoon Morakot in 2009.

Political disputes sometimes arose during humanitarian relief efforts. Taiwan declined China's offer of rescue teams and emergency supplies, accusing China of attempting to gain political advantage from the 1999 Jiji earthquake. On another occasion, China accused Taiwan of using the COVID-19 pandemic as a means to pursue independence.

== Military ==
Cross-strait conflict
- Part of the aftermath of the Chinese Civil War
Date	1 October 1949 – present (77 years, 1 month, 2 weeks and 6 days)
Location	Mainland China; Taiwan Area
Status	Ongoing

Belligerents
Republic of China (Taiwan)	People's Republic of China

Commanders and leaders
Lai Ching-te (since 2024) Former: Tsai Ing-wen (2016–2024); Ma Ying-jeou (2008–2016); Chen Shui-bian (2000–2008); Lee Teng-hui (1988–2000); Chiang Ching-kuo # (1978–1988); Yen Chia-kan (1975–1978); Chiang Kai-shek # (1948–1975)	Xi Jinping (since 2012) Former: Hu Jintao (2002–2012); Jiang Zemin (1989–2002); Deng Xiaoping (1978–1989); Hua Guofeng (1976–1978); Mao Zedong # (1949–1976)

=== Growing military tensions ===
The People's Republic of China's persistent opposition to Taiwan's de facto autonomy has edged many times on the possibility and threat of a military invasion of the latter territories with the aim of achieving its vision of Chinese unification. Such a threat has become increasingly tangible in the course of the 2020s, driven by the expressed willingness of mainland political leadership to pursue a military intervention, its parallel build-up of forces and recurrent exercises around Taiwan; as a consequence, Taiwan has also pursued forms of military preparation and international political alignment to discourage and possibly resist such intervention.

Taiwan's President Lai Ching-te has emphasized the need for stronger measures to counter China's increased efforts to infiltrate and weaken Taiwan's defenses, particularly through espionage and psychological warfare. In response, Taiwan has proposed stricter laws, including reinstating military trials for espionage and restricting access to Taiwanese identification for Chinese nationals. China's frequent military exercises near Taiwan's airspace and waters, including recent incursions and information leaks by retired Taiwanese military personnel, have heightened concerns. Taiwan has bolstered its defense with new weapons and extended mandatory military service to one year. China continues to assert territorial claims over Taiwan, and in 2025, the island marked the 20th anniversary of China's Anti-Secession Act, which outlines conditions under which China might use force to reclaim Taiwan.

US officials have warned that China's military could be prepared for potential military action against Taiwan by 2027 although the US intelligence community has expressed skepticism that China has any plans to execute such an action. Beijing's large-scale exercises, including a simulated siege of the island, were described by Admiral Samuel Paparo, head of U.S. Indo-Pacific Command, as indicators of this readiness.

In late 2025, China conducted extensive military drills around Taiwan, including warships, aircraft, and rocket launches, claiming to simulate a blockade. While these maneuvers garnered international attention, Taiwan largely dismissed them, with the public showing little concern due to the frequency of such exercises since 2022. Despite China's growing military presence, Taiwanese media focused on domestic events, reflecting a sense of routine rather than panic.

China has stationed converted J-6 fighter jets as attack drones at six air bases near the Taiwan Strait. Satellite images show the drones at base in Fujian and Guangdong provinces. Experts suggest they could be used to overwhelm Taiwan's defense. Taiwan plans to acquire counter-drone system in response.

On 19 May 2026, Taiwan's Premier Cho Jung-tai said China's military actions were the main source of regional instability, after Beijing conducted exercises near the island. China, which claims Taiwan as its territory, has increased military pressure through patrols and drills in the Taiwan Strait and surrounding waters. Taiwan described these actions as threatening peace and safety, while China called them routine training.

On 26 May 2026, Taiwan's Ministry of National Defence said it had tracked a Chinese "joint combat readiness patrol" around the island involving 29 military aircraft and seven warships, with most of the aircraft crossing the Taiwan Strait's median line. Taiwan said its forces monitored and responded to the activity, which it views as part of increasing Chinese military pressure.

In late May 2026, a China Coast Guard vessel entered waters near Pratas Island, which is controlled by Taiwan, leading to a 30-hour standoff with Taiwan's Coast Guard.

In June 2026, Taiwan's coast guard reported that it had expelled four Chinese government ships that entered restricted waters off the island's southern tip. The incident came after more Chinese ships were spotted near Taiwan, and both sides issued warnings to each other. Taiwanese officials called the move coercive, while China said it was just a routine law-enforcement operation. The same month, Chinese research vessel Xiangyanghong 22 conducted a marine survey in waters east of Taiwan that Beijing claims as its own. China said such surveys would become a regular part of its scientific activities and maritime presence. Taiwan reported increased activity by Chinese coast guard and survey ships near sensitive areas, including the Pratas Islands, and said it was part of a broader effort to put pressure on the island.

In July 2026, China started new coast guard patrols in waters east of Taiwan, saying they are protecting its territorial and maritime rights. Taiwan rejected the move, calling the patrols illegal under international law, and said China has no authority in those waters. Taiwan also sent its coast guard to monitor the Chinese ships. The patrols came after similar operations in June as China continued to push its claims over Taiwan. Taiwan has described this as "lawfare". The same month, China began live-fire military drills in parts of the Taiwan Strait near Fujian province.

On 12 August 2026, Indonesia said its naval exercise with China east of Taiwan was a routine passing exercise. Taiwan called it a military provocation, while China said the drill showed cooperation and reinforced its claim over the waters around Taiwan.

=== Possibility of a PRC invasion ===
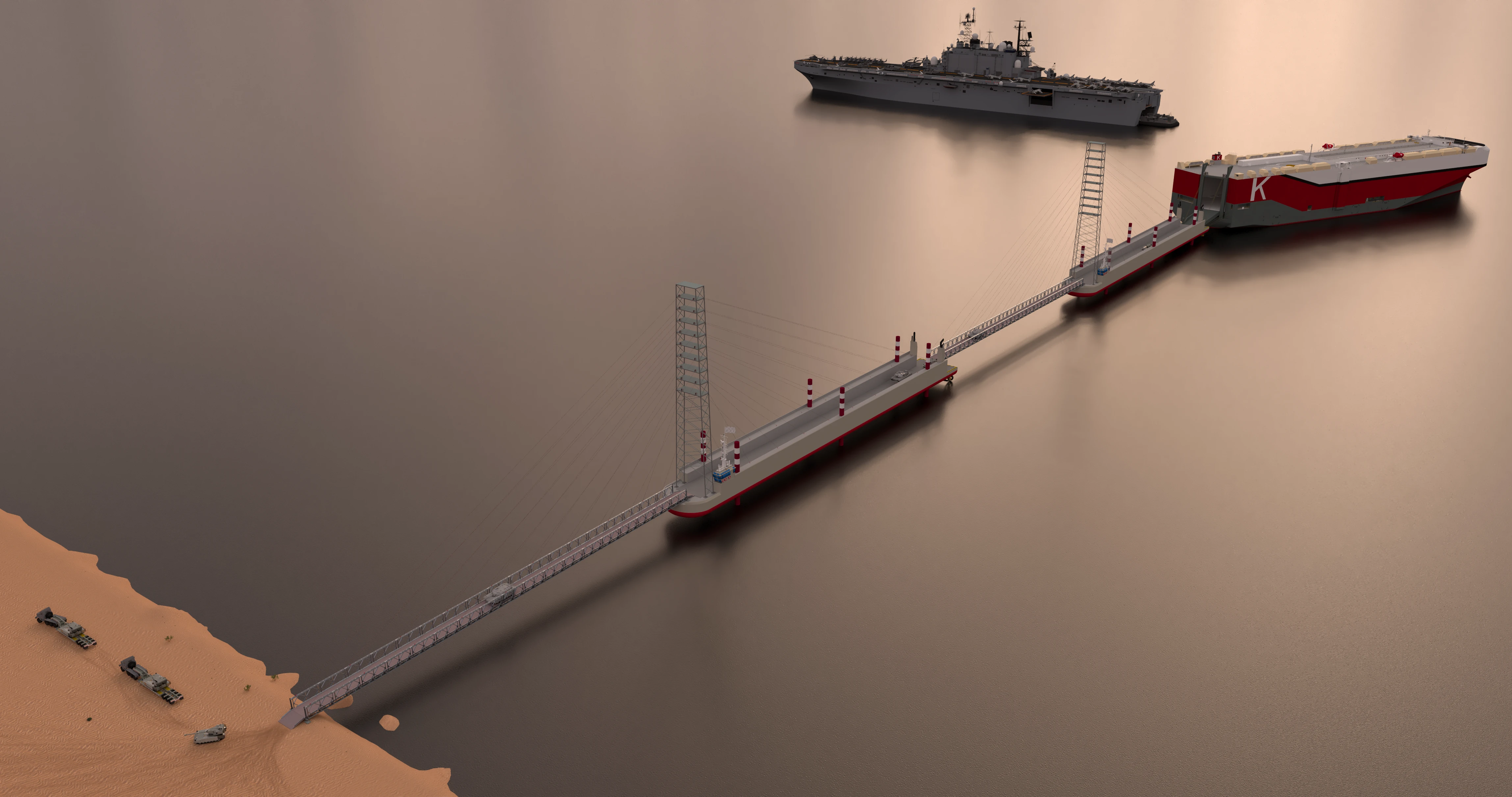
3D sketch of a bailey bridge barge dock being developed by China to potentially invade Taiwan

Speculation about the odds of war between China and Taiwan is rife. The Deputy Director-General of Taiwan's National Security Bureau, Chen Wen-fan, stated in 2020 that Xi Jinping intends to solve the "Taiwan Problem" by 2049. In 2022, U.S. Pacific Command described the situation of cross-strait relations as being dire, as China was amassing the largest build-up of military personnel and assets seen since World War II. Admiral Mike Gilday, Chief of Naval Operations of the U.S. Navy, warned that the American military must be prepared for the possibility of a Chinese invasion of Taiwan before 2024. A poll conducted by the Center for Strategic and International Studies (CSIS) summarized that China is determined to unify with Taiwan and the potential for a military crisis or conflict in the Taiwan Strait is very real. The poll also showed that China is willing to wait to unify with Taiwan peacefully, but would immediately invade if Taiwan declared independence.

The People's Liberation Army's current capacity of carrying out and winning such a war is a matter of debate, ranging mostly on the analysis whether it has the power to take the self-governing island despite the heavy costs foreseen. The perceived failure of the Russian army in rapidly occupying Ukraine, turning into a protracted conflict with destabilizing repercussions inside Russia itself, is believed to weigh on PRC decision making.

=== Geopolitical strategies and alliances ===
The consolidation of Chinese hegemony in the Indo-Pacific and the immediate economic repercussions of the disruption to commodities logistics and electronic technology production are its main concerns in relation to Taiwan's security.

The United States of America officially follows the "One-China policy", encouraging China and Taiwan to resolve their differences through dialogue, while also supporting Taiwan's efforts to enhance its self-defense under the Taiwan Relations Act. The U.S. has conducted military exchanges with Taiwan, and U.S. military vessels have occasionally transited the Taiwan Strait. Chinese leader Xi Jinping requested that U.S. President Biden change the U.S. position to explicitly oppose Taiwan's independence, but the U.S. maintained that it "does not support" Taiwan independence. After President Trump returned to the White House in 2025, the U.S. State Department removed the phrase "we do not support Taiwan independence" from the fact sheet on its website.

Aside from the United States, Australia, Canada, France, Germany, Japan, New Zealand, and the United Kingdom all had naval vessels transit the Taiwan Strait in the 2020s. Some analysts see India as an approximation to the United States as a visible positioning as well as a growing liability, amounting to the possibility of the country being dragged into the war.

=== Historical parallels ===
In response to Chinese military threats and recent drills near its coast in February 2025, Taiwan's defense ministry warned that history, including World War II, showed that aggression leads to failure. Marking 80 years since the war's end, Taiwan compared China's actions to past invaders, accusing Beijing of destabilizing the region. Taiwan, once a Japanese colony, has a complex wartime history, with some Taiwanese fighting for Japan. Meanwhile, Xi Jinping attended Russia's World War Two commemorations.

== Public opinion ==
=== China ===
A 2019 phone survey conducted in nine major cities found that 53.1% of respondents supported using military force for unification with Taiwan while 39.1% stated that they would oppose military force under any circumstance. A survey conducted between 2020 and 2021 showed that 55 percent of the respondents accepted launching a war to unify with Taiwan entirely while 33 percent of them opposed. 22 percent of the respondents accepted the two sides of the Taiwan Strait keeping separate political systems, with unification not necessarily being the end game.

Another survey conducted in 2022 showed Chinese respondents were split between those favoring tough policies on Taiwan and those favoring friendly ones.

A September 2024 poll by the Carter Center and Emory University found that 55% of mainland Chinese respondents agreed with the statement that "the Taiwan problem should not be resolved using force under any circumstances", with 24.5% dissagreeing. By 2026, those agreeing had dropped to 45%, while those disagreeing rose to 38%.

According to a 2025 poll by the Chicago Council on Global Affairs and the Carter Center, 91% of Chinese people consider "our Taiwan compatriots" to be a friend of China, while 9% do not. The poll also found that 44% of Chinese people consider the "current government of Taiwan, China" to be a friend of China, while 55% do not. According to a 2026 feeling thermometer poll by the Carter Center and Emory University, Chinese opinion of Taiwan was on average 62 out of 100. 80% agreed with the statement that "unification with Taiwan would symbolize resolving a long-standing historical issue" while 71% agreed that "both sides of the strait share the same cultural heritage and are like one family".

Young jingoistic Chinese nationalists on the internet, also called Little Pink, occasionally bypassed the Great Firewall to flood websites with messages and stickers in protest against Taiwan independence.

=== Taiwan ===
Results from an identity survey conducted each year since 1992 by the Election Study Center, National Chengchi University. Responses are Taiwanese (green), Chinese (red) or both Taiwanese and Chinese (hatched). Non-responses are shown as grey.

An annual poll conducted by the Election Study Center of National Chengchi University (NCCU) showed that the Taiwanese public preferred maintaining some form of the status quo, rather than choosing immediate Taiwan independence or unification with China. A regular survey released by the Mainland Affairs Council (MAC) yielded similar results. Another regular survey conducted by the Taiwanese Public Opinion Foundation (TPOF) indicated that the public preferred independence over unification. According to Taiwan's Mainland Affairs Council, percentage of people favoring "maintaining the ‘status quo’ and deciding on independence or unification later" fell from 40.5 percent in 2005 to 24.1 percent in 2026, percentage preferring "maintaining the ‘status quo’ indefinitely" increased from 19 percent to 33.9 percent, those supporting unification in some form dropped from 13.8 percent to 7.8 percent, while those supporting independence rose from 20 percent to 27.8 percent.

On people's national identity of being either "Taiwanese" or "Chinese," a majority of respondents identify as Taiwanese in either poll of the NCCU or the TPOF. MAC polls have consistently shown support for the future of Taiwan to be decided by the people in Taiwan.

In 2020, an annual poll conducted by Academia Sinica showed 73 percent of respondents disagreed with the statement that "the Chinese government is a friend of Taiwan's," an increase of 15 percent from the previous year. In 2024, an annual survey by Academia Sinica found that 80.6 percent of Taiwan residents believe Taiwan and China do not belong to the same country. According to a poll by the Japan-Taiwan Exchange Association conducted between December 2025 and January 2026, only 3% Taiwanese consider China as their favorite country; more than 75% consider Japan as their favorite country.

According to My Formosa, 26.4 percent of Taiwanese respondents agreed that "both sides of the Taiwan Strait belong under one China", up from 17.4 in 2024, while 65.7 percent disagreed, down from 76.4 percent in 2025. Additionally, 37.4 percent of Taiwanese respondents classified cross-strait relations as a business partnership, while 16.9 percent classified as a relationship between enemies. My Formosa also found that the percentage Taiwanese aged 20-29 who agreed that the mainland and Taiwan do not belong to "one China" fell from 82.1 percent to 65.8 percent from 2015 to 2025. Additionally, the percentage of Taiwanese aged 20–29 who favored independence dropped from 26.7 in 2023 to 17.9 in 2025, while the percentage who favored unification increased from 1.4 percent to 6.8 percent.

== See also ==
- Cross-Strait Economic, Trade and Culture Forum
- Cross-strait high-level talks
- Cross-Strait Peace Forum
- History of cross-strait relations
- Cold War II
