= Bombing of Shanghai =

Bombing of Shanghai may refer to:

- January 28 Incident (1932), during which Japanese air forces bombed Shanghai
- Battle of Shanghai (1937), during which both Chinese and Japanese air forces bombed Shanghai
  - Bloody Saturday (1937), air raids by the Republic of China Air Force that caused major civilian casualties and injuries
  - Battle of Jianqiao (1937), air battle between Chinese and Japanese air forces
- Bombing of Shanghai (1945), air raids by the Allied forces targeting Japanese military facilities in Shanghai
- Bombing of Shanghai (1949–1953), air raids by the Republic of China Air Force during the Chinese Civil War
