= Association for Tourism Exchange Across the Taiwan Straits =

Semi-official representative office of the People's Republic of China in Taiwan

Coordinates: 25.029291°N 121.548255°E

- 海峽兩岸旅遊交流協會
- Formation: 7 May 2010
- Type: NGO
- Region served: Taiwan
- President: Shao Qiwei
- Website: hlhbsc.org

Association for Tourism Exchange Across the Taiwan Straits
- Traditional Chinese: 海峽兩岸旅遊交流協會
- Simplified Chinese: 海峡两岸旅游交流协会
Transcriptions
Standard Mandarin
- Hanyu Pinyin: Hǎixiá Liǎng'àn Lǚyóu Jiāoliú Xiéhuì

The Association for Tourism Exchange Across the Taiwan Straits (ATETS; Chinese: 海峽兩岸旅遊交流協會) is a semi-official representative office of the People's Republic of China in Taiwan handling tourism-related affairs. Its counterpart body in Mainland China by the Republic of China (Taiwan) is the Taiwan Strait Tourism Association.

The CSTEA office is located in Ruentex Tower at Daan District, Taipei.

== Opening ==
The official opening ceremony of CSTEA in Taiwan was held at the Grand Hotel in Taipei on 7 May 2010. The ceremony was attended by people from both sides of the Taiwan Strait. Shao Qiwei, President of CSTEA, represented Mainland China and served as both of the main speaker and master of ceremonies during the banquet.

Kao Koong-lian, Vice Chairperson of Straits Exchange Foundation, and Janice Lai, Director-General of the Tourism Bureau of the ROC Ministry of Transportation and Communications and Chairperson of Taiwan Strait Tourism Association were also present during the ceremony.

== Tasks ==
The main tasks of CSTEA are:

- Consulting in tourism-related affairs
- Facilitating communications
- Handling disputes
- Promoting cross-strait tourism

== Transportation ==
The office is accessible within walking distance southeast from Daan Station of the Taipei Metro.

== See also ==
- Taiwan Strait Tourism Association
- List of diplomatic missions in Taiwan
- Cross-Strait relations
