= Taiwan Strait Tourism Association =

- 台灣海峽兩岸觀光旅遊協會
- Formation: 4 May 2010
- Type: NGO
- Region served: People's Republic of China
- Chairperson: David W. J. Hsieh

The Taiwan Strait Tourism Association (TSTA; traditional Chinese: 台灣海峽兩岸觀光旅遊協會; simplified Chinese: 台湾海峡两岸观光旅游协会; pinyin: Táiwān Hǎixiá Liǎng'àn Guānguāng Lǚyóu Xiéhuì) is a semi-official representative office of the Republic of China (Taiwan) in mainland China handling tourism-related affairs. Its counterpart body in Taiwan by the People's Republic of China is the Association for Tourism Exchange Across the Taiwan Straits.

== Offices ==
=== Beijing office ===
The first TSTA office in mainland China was opened on 4 May 2010. The TSTA office is located at LG Twin Towers in Chaoyang District, Beijing.

During the office official opening ceremony in Beijing, Shao Qiwei, President of the Mainland's Cross-Strait Tourism Exchange Association, said that with the establishment of the reciprocal tourism office across the Taiwan Strait means positive progress for exchange and interactions in various aspects between the two sides. Janice Lai, Chairperson of TSTA said that the establishment of the association in Beijing will also promote tourism industry of Taiwan and introduce Taiwan's sightseeing spots to the people in mainland China. This establishment also marks a new milestone leading to closer bilateral tourism exchanges between the two sides.

=== Shanghai office ===
The second TSTA office in mainland China is the Shanghai office, located in Zhabei District. The official opening ceremony was held on 15 November 2012, attended by David W. J. Hsieh, Director-General of the Tourism Bureau of the Republic of China, Shao Qiwei, President of the Cross-Strait Tourism Exchange Association and Tu Jiang, Chairman of Association for Tourism Exchange Across the Taiwan Straits. The office will handle Taiwan-related tourism affairs in Shanghai, Jiangsu, Zhejiang, Anhui, Fujian and Jiangxi.

== Tasks ==
The three major tasks of TSTA are:

- Expanding distribution channels and improving the packaging of quality tourism products
- Strengthening publicity and promotion
- Introducing theme packages by regions

== Transportation ==
The Beijing office of TSTA is accessible within walking distance southwest from Yong'anli Station of the Beijing Subway. The Shanghai office of TSTA is accessible within walking distance southeast from People's Square Station of the Shanghai Metro.

== See also ==
- Cross-Strait Tourism Exchange Association
- List of diplomatic missions of Taiwan
- Cross-Strait relations
