= 22 point regulation =

22 point regulation was a guideline approved by the Chinese Communist Party in 1988 to encourage Taiwanese investments in the People's Republic of China.

== Focus ==
The law encouraged specifically land production and land development in Hainan Island, Guangdong, Fujian and other coastal provinces. It guaranteed Taiwan establishments would not be nationalized, and that exports were free from tariffs. Taiwanese management would be granted multiple visas.

== See also ==
- Economy of China
