= Bombing of Shanghai (1949–1953) =

Bombing of Shanghai by the Republic of China in 1949–1953

- Part of Chinese Civil War; Cold War in Asia
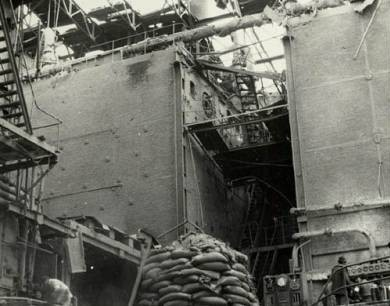
- Zhabei Water and Power Plant after the bombing of 6 February 1950
Date	1949–1953
Location	Shanghai, China
Result	Inconclusive; Shanghai remains under the control of the PRC; ROCAF retreats to Taiwan; PLAAF retains control of Shanghai's airspace

Belligerents
Republic of China: Republic of China Air Force; Supported by United States: United States Air Force	China: People's Liberation Army Air Force; Supported by Soviet Union: Soviet Air Forces

Commanders and leaders
(Taiwan) Chiang Kai-shek; (Taiwan) Zhou Zhirou; (United States) Stuart Symington; (United States) Thomas K. Finletter	(China) Chen Yi (Soviet Union) Pavel Batitsky

The Bombing of Shanghai was a series of air raids conducted by the Republic of China (ROC) on Shanghai, which was under the control of the People's Republic of China (PRC), from 1949 to 1953. After the conclusion of the Shanghai Campaign in May 1949, the People's Liberation Army (PLA) of the Chinese Communist Party (CCP) took control of the city. Despite their retreat to Taiwan, the ROC Air Force (ROCAF) continued to launch bombings on Shanghai, leading to severe civilian casualties and the disruption of industrial activities.

The most devastating incident during this bombing campaign took place on 6 February 1950, when the ROC Air Force dispatched 14 bombers and 3 fighter planes to carry out an attack on Shanghai. Over the course of an hour and a half, they dropped 60 to 70 bombs weighing 500 pounds each, destroying over 2,000 buildings and causing over 1,400 civilian casualties. This led to the suspension of operations at several factories and the destruction of key infrastructure, including the Yangshupu Power Plant and Shanghai Tramways. After the bombing, the CCP's intelligence discovered and dismantled a ROC spy base. On the afternoon of 7 February, Luo Bingqian, the head of the ROC's Intelligence Bureau in Shanghai, was executed by the Shanghai Public Security Bureau.

The air raids on 6 February 1950 led to the intervention of the Soviet Air Forces, which additionally provided over a hundred aircraft of various types and several anti-aircraft guns, which succeeded in downing multiple ROC aircraft. The ROC government decided to prioritise the security of Taiwan and withdrew its forces from the Zhoushan Archipelago, losing its base for bombing operations against Shanghai. This marked the end of large-scale air raids and skirmishes over the city. After the conflict, the Soviets transferred their aircraft and equipment to the Chinese, allowing the PLA to establish its first air defence force.

== Background ==
In May 1949, the Third Field Army of the PLA, led by Chen Yi, captured Shanghai, the economic hub of China. The ROC army retreated to the Zhoushan Archipelago and other southeastern coastal islands, using its superior naval and air forces to launch frequent counterattacks against the mainland. On 26 October 1949, the ROC forces won the Battle of Guningtou. Following this strategic turning point, the ROC command formulated a plan to progressively reconquest mainland China within five years. Due to Shanghai's significant economic importance, the ROC forces took various actions in both economic and military spheres to disrupt the new government's efforts to take control of the city, including conducting air raids on Shanghai.

== Maritime blockade ==
In 1949, the industrial production in Shanghai relied on imports of major raw materials such as cotton, wheat, paper, tobacco, and fuel. Since June 1949, the ROC Government imposed a maritime blockade policy against the mainland. This led to tension with the United States and the United Kingdom, during which the ROC Navy fired on American merchant ships and engaged in standoffs with the British Navy. On 24 November, a British merchant ship was intercepted by ROC forces at the Jiuduansha lighthouse area outside the mouth of the Yangtze River. For three days, British and ROC forces remained in a tense standoff. During this time, the American merchant ship SS Sir John Franklin attempted to force its way through and was fired upon by ROC forces, nearly sinking before managing to limp to Shanghai. On 27 November, the British forces withdrew from the Yangtze. On December 24, the ROC Navy began laying mines at the mouth of the Yangtze River.

The blockade policy implemented by the ROC government effectively sealed off the Yangtze River estuary, preventing production materials from entering Shanghai and plunging the city's economy into distress.

Although the new government in Shanghai municipality implemented a series of measures to stabilize industrial production, the blockade significantly impacted manufacturing. With the blockade proving effective and reducing the threat posed by the PLA to Taiwan, the ROCAF expanded the Zhoushan airfield and gathered aircraft in preparation for bombing raids on Shanghai and other eastern coastal cities. At this time, although the Third Anti-Aircraft Artillery Division, comprising four regiments, had been deployed in Shanghai, the city's overall air defense capability remained weak.

== Air raids ==
From October 1949 to February 1950, the ROCAF launched over 20 air raids on Shanghai from airfields located in Zhoushan and other areas. These attacks dropped more than 360 bombs, damaging over 2,300 buildings and resulting in more than 2,300 casualties. Between 7 January and 6 February 1950, the air force conducted four consecutive targeted attacks on power generation facilities and key urban infrastructure, with the most intense taking place on 6 February 1950. On 25 January 1950, the ROC Air Force carried out a heavy bombing raid on the Jiangnan Shipyard and the Pudong Shipyard, causing significant damage and destruction to 26 ships from the PLA Navy, including vessels like "Changzhou" and "Wanshouhua."

=== 6 February 1950 ===
On 5 February 1950, ROC military aircraft dropped leaflets over coastal cities including Shanghai, Hangzhou, and Tianjin, warning residents to stay away from power plants, docks, and military barracks to avoid potential harm from air raids. In Shanghai, most residents living near these facilities did not take the warning seriously. Prior to the air raid, the Yangshupu Power Plant was operating at full capacity with an output of 96,369 kilowatts, accounting for over 80% of the total electricity supply within Shanghai.

On 6 February, from 12:25 p.m. to 1:53 p.m., the ROCAF deployed its main pilots in four groups totalling 17 bombers, including 12 B-24 "Liberator" heavy bombers, 2 B-25 "Mitchell" medium bombers, 2 P-51 "Mustang" fighters, and 1 P-38 "Lightning" fighter, dropping 67 bombs over Shanghai. The bombing targeted several key production facilities for power, water supply, and machinery, with the Yangshupu Power Plant, Shanghai's largest power plant at the time, suffering the most severe damage. The plant was hit by 15 bombs, 9 of which struck its buildings and equipment, destroying all coal-feeding equipment. Thirteen boilers and six turbines were damaged to varying extents, and one main generator was heavily damaged, reducing the plant's 150,000-kilowatt output to zero. A total of 28 employees of the Shanghai Power Company were killed; 24 bodies were recovered intact, while 4 were missing and presumed dead.

At 1:20 p.m., the Huashang Electric Company on Nanchezhan Road in the Nanshi District was also bombed. Over ten distribution lines at the power distribution centre were damaged, resulting in economic losses exceeding US$700,000. Two people were killed and six were injured, and the distribution room was severely damaged, rendering it unable to supply power. Previously, during the Second Sino-Japanese War, the facility had been occupied by Japanese forces and sold off cheaply under Wang Jingwei's administration, making it one of the most heavily plundered units in Shanghai. The company mainly resold surplus power purchased from the Shanghai Power Company to end-users. The Zhabei Water and Power Company only had its No. 5 boiler destroyed and part of its building burned, but power generation was not impacted. The French-owned Electric Tram and Light Company also suffered significant bombing, but due to inaccurate targeting, the bombs fell around the plant rather than hitting it directly, sparing its power generation and transmission capabilities. However, 21 people were killed and 32 were injured.

After the air raid, more than 2,000 buildings were destroyed in areas such as Yangshupu, Songshan, Luwan, Penglai, Jiangwan, and Wusong in Shanghai. The raid resulted in 1,464 civilian casualties, including 595 deaths and 869 injuries, and affected over 50,000 residents. Although the primary targets of the air raid were power plants, the surrounding civilian population was severely affected, especially in the Songshan, Luwan, and Penglai districts. Songshan district was hit by 7 to 8 bombs, impacting three main areas that included 11 neighbourhood blocks. The raid destroyed 298 single-storey houses, 5 multi-storey buildings, and 2 thatched houses, affecting 648 households. The casualties included 231 deaths, 206 serious injuries, and 9 missing persons. In the Xieqiao, more than 60% of the houses were destroyed. Luwan was hit by 5 bombs, including 2 incendiary bombs, affecting 189 households. The casualties included 91 people burned to death, 66 killed by explosions, 37 crushed to death, 35 seriously injured, and 37 lightly injured, with a total of 1,215 people affected. The damage included 23 single-storey buildings, 73 single-storey rooms, 3 thatched sheds, and 3 factories destroyed. The area was largely made up of slums, mainly inhabited by refugees from northern Jiangsu. The bombing occurred around midday, leading to a high number of casualties among women and children. In Penglai district, four locations, including the Zhongshan South Road hospital entrance and Waijiangjiazhai, were heavily bombed. The attacks resulted in 72 civilian deaths, 11 serious injuries, 70 minor injuries, and 4 missing persons. A total of 119 houses were destroyed. Due to Shanghai's power generation capacity dropping from 250,000 kilowatts to just 4,000 kilowatts, nearly all factories in the city ceased operations. Power outages affected most districts, leaving high-rise building elevators stranded and many shops closed. Shanghai was plunged into darkness, and blackout measures restricted each household to just half an hour of electricity per day, allowing only one light bulb to be used.

Additionally, the air raids also damaged Shanghai's water supply facilities, causing significant disruptions to the city's water distribution. Residents were unable to flush toilets or access clean water. The attacks resulted in 1,148 casualties and the destruction of 1,180 buildings. In response, the Shanghai Municipal Government quickly implemented emergency measures to safeguard critical resources and ensure the safety of citizens. Efforts were made to repair the damaged power infrastructure, and after 42 hours and 5 minutes of emergency work, the city was able to restore basic electricity supply. However, Shanghai's industrial production and daily life were still greatly impacted, with economic losses amounting to 5 million US dollars.

== Soviet intervention ==
Due to the relatively weaker PLA Air Force compared to ROCAF at the time, the PRC government requested aerial support from the Soviet Union. At that time, PRC and the Soviet Union were negotiating the Sino-Soviet Treaty of Friendship, Alliance, and Mutual Assistance. The Soviet Union agreed to provide air defence assistance to Shanghai, but only under the condition that PRC sign a supplementary agreement to the treaty. Faced with pressing air defence challenges and international pressures, the PRC side eventually acquiesced.

In March 1950, at PRC invitation, a mixed air force group was established under the leadership of Soviet commanders Pavel Batitsky. The group was composed of two fighter regiments, one mixed aviation corps, a searchlight regiment, and an anti-aircraft radar battalion, totalling 108 aircraft, including 38 MiG-15 fighters, the world's most advanced subsonic aircraft at the time. This force was deployed to Shanghai to strengthen air defence in China. During the period from March to May of that year, four air battles occurred, in which Soviet aircraft shot down six ROCAF planes, forcing the ROC government to cease further attacks on Shanghai. Subsequently, due to a shift in strategic priorities to safeguard Taiwan, the ROC forces withdrew from Zhoushan. With no nearby airports for takeoff and landing, the ROC air force was no longer able to conduct large-scale airstrikes or harassments over Shanghai, marking the end of the larger-scale aerial battle for the city's airspace.

To strengthen air defence capabilities after the 6 February bombing, the Central Military Commission increased efforts to build up the air force in Shanghai. The PLA Air Force's 4th Mixed Brigade was established in Shanghai, marking the beginning of the PRC's air force development. Shanghai's dedicated defence unit, the Shanghai Garrison District, still maintains an anti-aircraft defence force at the brigade level.

== Aftermath ==
=== Anti-espionage efforts ===
Due to the need for ROCAF bombers to fly at high altitudes to avoid anti-aircraft fire, their bombing accuracy was generally low. However, the ROCAF bombers had a relatively high hit rate during the air raids on Shanghai. As a result, the Communist intelligence services suspected that ground-based guides were providing radio navigation for the aircraft. This led to an intensification of their security and counterintelligence efforts. Both the Nationalist and Communist sides engaged in a series of espionage activities centered around this issue. Eventually, ROC intelligence officer Luo Bingqian was captured by the Communist security services and executed.

=== Repairing infrastructure ===
During the Korean War, both the ROCAF and the United States Air Force sent aircraft into Shanghai airspace for reconnaissance or harassment missions, but these aircraft were either shot down or repelled by the People's Liberation Army and militia forces. The largest steam turbine at the Yangshupu Power Plant, which had been severely damaged in the 6 February bombing, required repairs in Switzerland. However, due to the blockade of maritime routes, the turbine had to be transported overland through the Soviet Union, Austria, and Czechoslovakia, taking over a month to complete its repairs before returning to Shanghai. On 30 December, the Shanghai Military Control Commission placed the Shanghai Electric Power Company, originally owned by American businessmen, under military control and nationalised the power plant.

=== Promoting war bonds ===
With limited government revenue and large-scale expenditure, PRC began attempting to issue government bonds in November 1950. Shanghai was required to meet 45% of the quota. To promote the bonds, the Liberation Daily and Ta Kung Pao carried out extensive campaigns: they capitalised on the emotional response to the earlier 6 February bombing, stirring up anti-American and anti-Chiang Kai-shek sentiment to encourage residents to purchase the bonds.

=== Ending private banking ===
After the 6 February bombing, from 7 February to the end of May, 89 banks and pawnshops in Shanghai closed or went bankrupt, including 40 pawnshops (4 of which were branches of institutions from other regions), leaving only 30 remaining, a loss of more than half. Researchers at the Shanghai Bank Museum attribute this wave of closures to several factors: the dysfunction of the Pawnshop Association, the loss of credibility within the pawnshop industry, illegal business practices and declining profitability in the industry, the government's crackdown on speculation, and the destructive impact of the bombing. These factors created a vicious cycle where businesses could not repay loans, collect debts, issue loans, or borrow money, leading to a large-scale depression in private industry and the private banking sector.

== Memorial ==
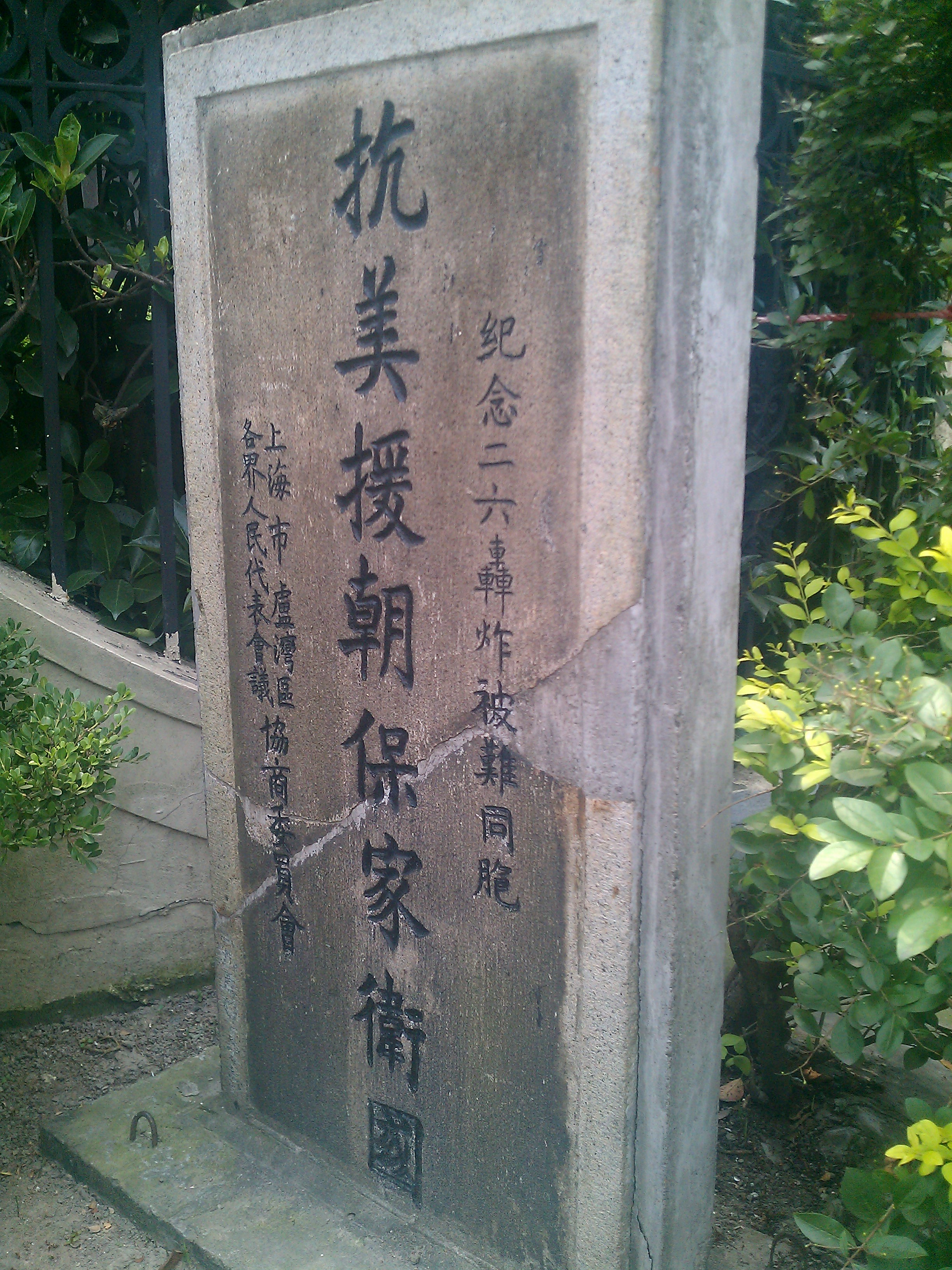
Memorial stele of the 6 February bombing

To commemorate the 6 February bombing, on the anniversary of the attack, the Luwan District government of Shanghai funded the creation of the "Shanghai 6 February bombing Memorial" under the name "Memorial Service for the People Who Died in the 6 February bombing." However, due to restrictions imposed by the local traffic management authorities, the memorial stone could not be placed near the bombing site. It was not until 1952, after proposals by Huang Yuanqing and Lu Agen, and approval by the second People's Representative Assembly of Shanghai (the predecessor to the Shanghai CPPCC), that the memorial was finally erected within a bamboo fence at 458–468 Xujiahui Road. During the Korean War, the front of the monument featured the words "Resist America, Aid Korea, Protect the Homeland," while the back carried a 300-character inscription commemorating the victims of the bombing. The memorial was destroyed during the Cultural Revolution but was later repaired, though it fell into disrepair over time. It has since been listed as an immovable cultural heritage site in the third national cultural heritage survey.
