= 2015 meeting of Ma Ying-jeou and Xi Jinping =

Meeting between leaders of the two Chinas

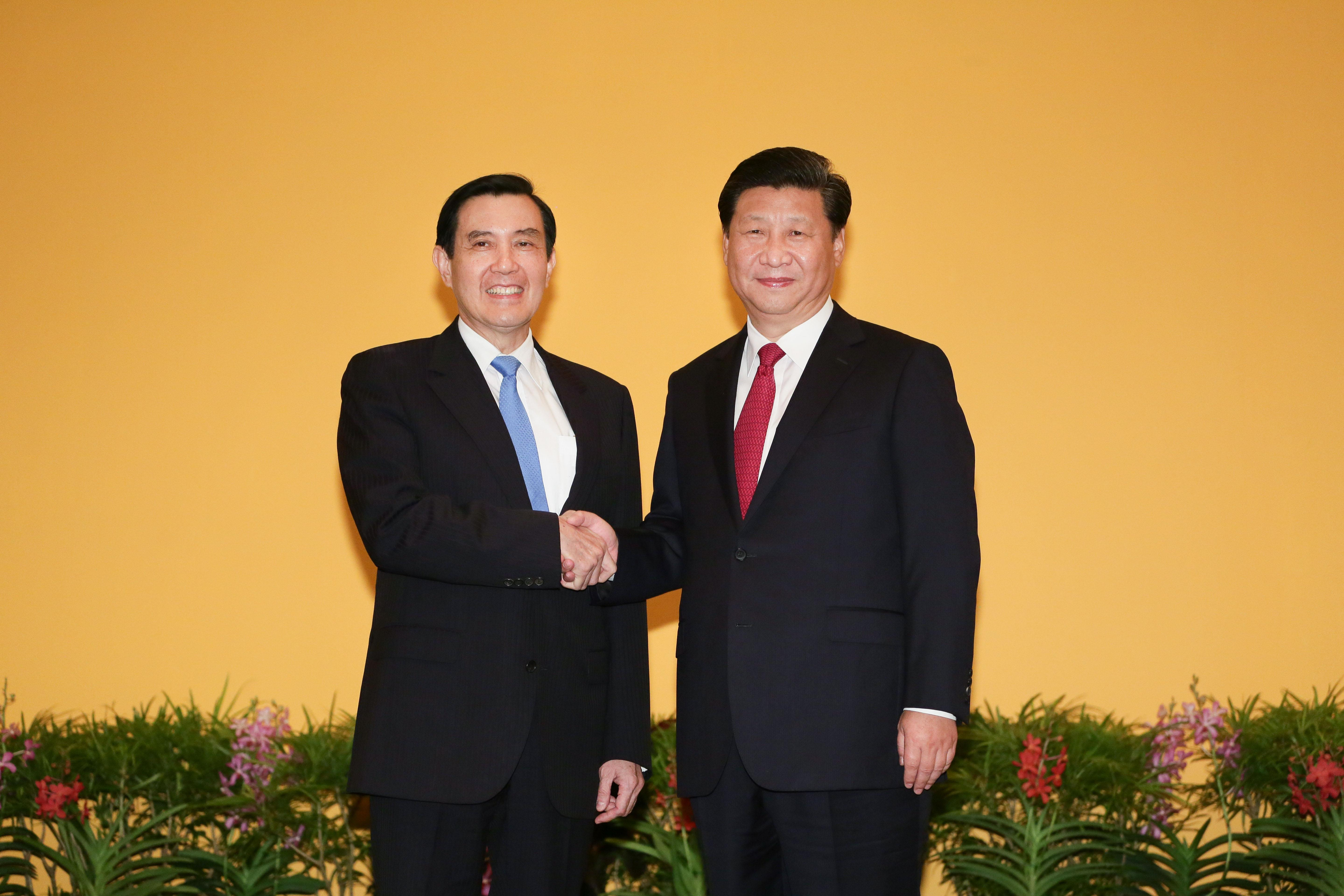
- Ma Ying-jeou (left) and Xi Jinping (right) shaking hands on 7 November 2015
- Native name: 馬習會
- Date: 7 November 2015
- Time: 3:00 p.m. SST (UTC+8)
- Venue: Shangri-La Hotel, Singapore
- Location: Singapore; 1°18′40.4″N 103°49′35.2″E
- Participants: Ma Ying-jeou; Xi Jinping

On 7 November 2015, Ma Ying-jeou, President of the Republic of China (Taiwan; ROC), and Xi Jinping, General Secretary of the Chinese Communist Party (CCP) and President of the People's Republic of China (Mainland China; PRC), met in Singapore. The meeting was the first between the political leaders of the two sides of the Taiwan Strait (the two Chinas) since the end of the Chinese Civil War in 1949 and the first since the meeting between Chiang Kai-shek and Mao Zedong in Chongqing during the Double Tenth Agreement in August 1945. The meeting mainly focused on exchanging views on peaceful cross-strait relations, and the two sides did not sign any agreements or issue any joint statements.

The meeting took place at 3 p.m. Singapore time in the Dongling Hall and Jurong Hall of the Island Ballroom on the lobby floor of the Shangri-La Hotel, Singapore. The Singapore government assisted in organizing the meeting at the request of both sides. Ma Ying-jeou made a special trip to Singapore for this meeting, while Xi Jinping met with Ma Ying-jeou after concluding his state visits to Vietnam and Singapore. Both sides sent relevant officials on cross-strait relations to participate. The first half of the meeting was open to the media, while the second half was a closed-door meeting.

In order to achieve substantive equality and dignity, the two sides met as "mainland leader" and "Taiwan leader" and addressed each other as "Mister". Zhang Zhijun, director of the Taiwan Affairs Office, pointed out that "this is a pragmatic arrangement made in accordance with the one China principle under the circumstances that the political differences between the two sides have not yet been resolved." After the meeting, Zhang Zhijun held a press conference at 4:15 p.m., followed by Ma Ying-jeou at 4:45 p.m. at the same venue. The two sides had dinner together later that evening and returned to Beijing and Taipei respectively by special plane.

== Background ==
After the government of the Republic of China retreated to Taiwan in 1949, it had no official contact with the Chinese Communist Party (CCP) and the newly established People's Republic of China (PRC). In the 1950s, ROC president and Kuomintang leader Chiang Kai-shek sent journalist Cao Juren to shuttle between the two sides of the Taiwan Strait to facilitate political negotiations. In October 1956, Cao Juren met with CCP chairman Mao Zedong, where Mao revealed his idea of meeting and negotiating with Chiang Kai-shek again. In early 1975, Chiang Kai-shek instructed Chen Lifu, a senior advisor to the Presidential Office, to send a message through secret channels inviting Mao to visit Taiwan. However, Chiang and Mao died in 1975 and 1976 respectively. After that, Beijing proposed a meeting between the leaders of the two sides of the Taiwan Strait on several occasions under the names of "KMT–CCP talks" or "peace negotiations". In 1993, the Wang–Koo summit was held in Singapore and was positioned as a non-governmental and business-related meeting. In late April 1994, Taiwanese President Lee Teng-hui mentioned a meeting between leaders from both sides of the Taiwan Strait during an unofficial dialogue with Japanese writer Ryōtarō Shiba. On 30 September 1994, Lee Teng-hui gave an interview to The Wall Street Journal, revealing that high-level officials from both sides of the Strait had been in contact through undisclosed channels.

On 30 January 1995, CCP general secretary Jiang Zemin delivered a speech entitled "Continue to Strive for the Completion of the Great Cause of the Reunification of the Motherland" at the Spring Festival tea party of the Taiwan Affairs Office. He expressed his welcome to "the leader of the Taiwan authorities" to visit mainland China in an appropriate capacity and his willingness to accept the invitation from Taiwan to visit Taiwan. On 8 April 1995, Lee Teng-hui put forward a formal response containing six points at the National Unification Council. The fourth point advocated that the leaders of both sides of the Taiwan Strait should meet naturally and equally in international occasions, and that the meeting would have a positive significance for cross-strait relations. Lee also emphasized on several occasions that the best time and place for the leaders to meet was the Asia-Pacific Economic Cooperation (APEC) meeting held in Osaka in 1995. Both sides agreed that the leaders should meet, but they had different views on the identity, occasion and timing of the leaders’ meeting.

In 2008, the Kuomintang returned to power and Ma Ying-jeou became president. The atmosphere across the Taiwan Strait changed, and cross-strait political consultations were restarted, leading to a series of Jiang-Chen talks. On 12 June 2008, the Straits Exchange Foundation (SEF) and the Association for Relations Across the Taiwan Straits (ARATS) held consultations in Beijing and reached a consensus on several issues related to cross-strait exchanges, including cross-strait charter flights and mainland residents traveling to Taiwan. This was known as the First Chen–Chiang summit. SEF Chairman Chiang Pin-kung invited ARATS Chairman Chen Yunlin to visit Taiwan in the autumn 2008 to hold the Second Chen–Chiang summit. The main content was the signing of the Three Links Agreement, which fully opened the Three Links. During his 2012 presidential campaign, Ma Ying-jeou had told ETTV News in November 2011 that if reelected, he would "absolutely never meet with mainland leaders over the future four years" or discuss unification.

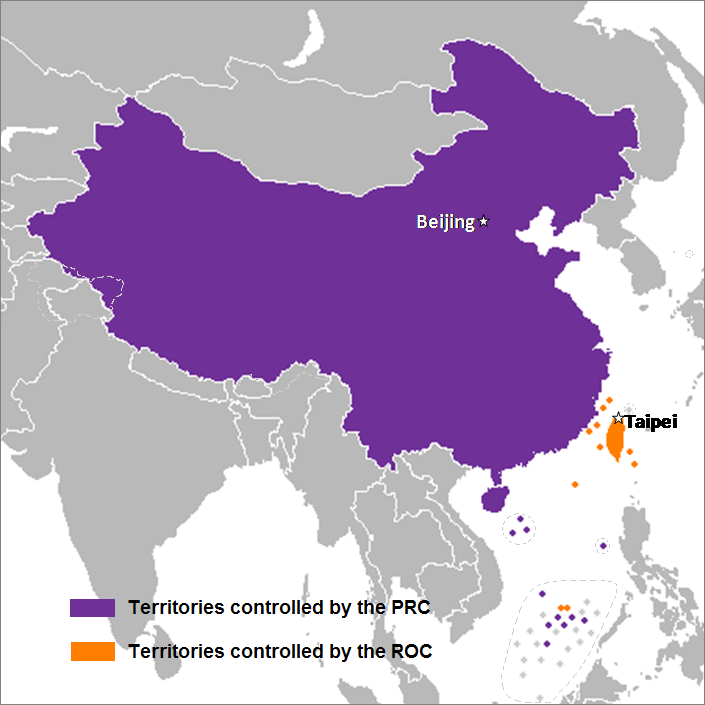
Map showing Chinese territories governed by the PRC and the ROC. The size of minor islands has been exaggerated in this map for ease of visibility.

=== Proposal ===
In November 2012, after Xi Jinping assumed the position of General Secretary of the Chinese Communist Party following the 18th CCP National Congress, the idea of a Ma–Xi meeting began to take shape. The initial concept was for the leaders of both sides of the Taiwan Strait to meet as leaders of their ruling parties (i.e., a meeting between Kuomintang Chairman Ma Ying-jeou and CCP General Secretary Xi Jinping). In February 2014, Wang Yu-chi, then Minister of the Mainland Affairs Council, met with Zhang Zhijun in Nanjing. The topics discussed included a Ma–Xi meeting. However, due to various internal and external factors and the lack of consensus between the two sides on the venue, the meeting was delayed until Ma Ying-jeou resigned as Kuomintang Chairman. It was later replaced by a Xi–Chu meeting between the newly elected Kuomintang Chairman Eric Chu and CCP General Secretary Xi Jinping, which occurred in 2015.

In October 2013, when Xi Jinping met with Vincent Siew, the representative of Chinese Taipei, at APEC Indonesia 2013, he pointed out that enhancing cross-strait political mutual trust and consolidating the common political foundation are the key to ensuring the peaceful development of cross-strait relations. He said the long-standing political differences between the two sides must eventually be resolved gradually, and these problems cannot be passed down from generation to generation. He added the mainland China is willing to conduct equal consultations with the Taiwan side on cross-strait political issues within the framework of one China and make reasonable arrangements. In December 2013, Ma Ying-jeou indicated that there was a possibility of holding a Ma–Xi meeting in his capacity as President of the Republic of China or Chairman of the Kuomintang and expressed his willingness to participate in the APEC meeting to be held in Beijing at the end of 2014, but the mainland side did not agree. In the end, former Vice President Vincent Siew met with Xi. Chang Hsien-yao, former special deputy chairman of the Mainland Affairs Council, also revealed that the two sides had planned several meetings between the leaders in 2014, such as meeting with Xi in Singapore on Ma’s return from his visit to Central and South America in July, and meeting with Xi in Kinmen on the grounds of the anniversary of the August 23 Artillery Battle. However, this was denied by Andrew Hsia, minister of the Mainland Affairs Council.

The 2015 meeting was proposed by Taiwan Affairs Office Director Zhang Zhijun during a discussion on cross-strait affairs with Mainland Affairs Council Minister Andrew Hsia in Guangzhou, China in October 2015. Initially, Hsia proposed that the meeting take place during the APEC Philippines 2015 in Manila, Philippines. However, Zhang found the recommendation to be unsuitable. Later, Hsia suggested the meeting occur in Singapore, where the Wang–Koo summit was held on 27–29 April 1993, the first cross-strait negotiation after a meeting one year earlier in British Hong Kong. In early November 2015, after the news that the Ma–Xi meeting was confirmed to be held, Mainland Affairs Council Minister Andrew Hsia revealed at a press conference that the topic was first raised by Zhang Zhijun, director of the Taiwan Affairs Office, after the Hsia–Zhang meeting held in Guangzhou in mid-October. Afterwards, they took it back to their superiors for instructions. Finally, after several weeks of back-and-forth consultations, the meeting was successfully finalized.

=== Preparation ===
Due to the political dispute between the two governments, officials on both sides agreed that the ROC leader and PRC leader would address each other as "mister" (先生) and that they would participate as "Leader of Taiwan" and "Leader of Mainland China" respectively. Journalists from Taiwan – accustomed to using Minguo calendar years since the founding of the Republic of China in 1912 – had to be reissued with identification sporting a date based on the Gregorian calendar system preferred in mainland China. The ROC Presidential Office stated that Ma intended for this meeting to "consolidate peace and maintain the status quo." President Ma and a group of his top advisors, including Presidential Office Secretary-General Tseng Yung-chuan and Deputy Secretary-General Hsiao Hsu-tsen (蕭旭岑), National Security Council Secretary-General Kao Hua-chu and advisor Chiu Kun-shuan, MAC Minister Andrew Hsia and Deputy Minister Wu Mei-hung, attended the meeting with him. Reporters from around the world began setting up their equipment at the Shangri-La Hotel on 5 November. Hotel staff restricted media to the meeting's main venue, the Shangri-La's ballroom. Media attendance of the meeting was limited to 400 personnel due to security concerns. Guest access to the ballroom had been barred beginning from 2 a.m. local time on 7 November.

=== Announcement ===
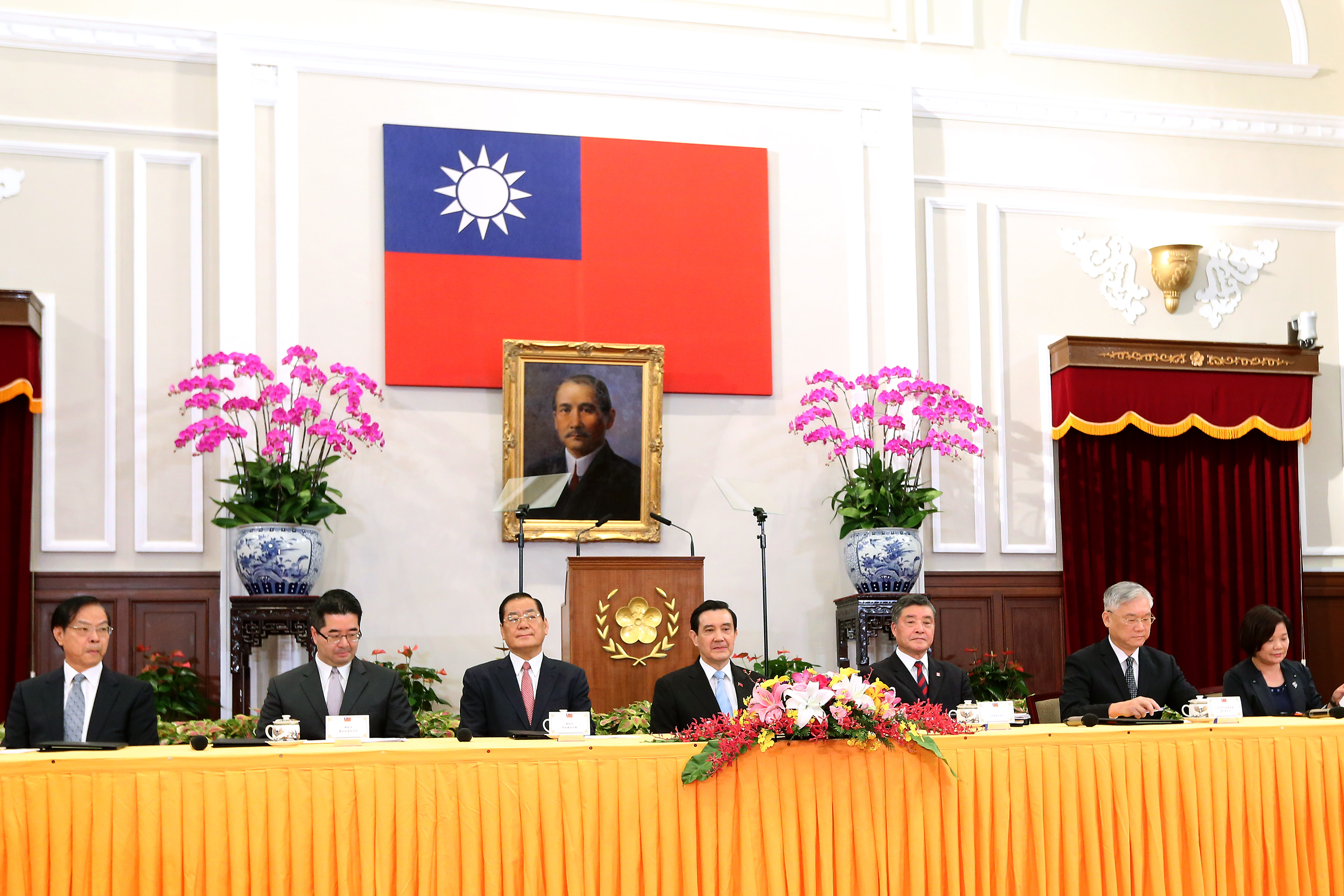
Ma Ying-jeou holds a pre-departure press conference.

At 10:34 p.m. on 3 November 2015, the Liberty Times exclusively revealed that Ma Ying-jeou and Xi Jinping would meet unexpectedly in Singapore on 7 November. It claimed that the meeting was secretly arranged without the consent or understanding of the Taiwanese citizens and parliament, which it said deviated from the norms of democratic countries. It also questioned, "What price will Taiwan have to pay to fulfill Ma Ying-jeou's personal wish?" Subsequently, Taiwanese media sought confirmation from the Presidential Office. More than an hour later, Presidential Office spokesperson Chen I-hsin issued a statement at 11:40 p.m. and released an audio file at midnight, confirming for the first time that the two leaders would officially meet. At 7:00 a.m. on 4 November, Taiwan Affairs Office director Zhang Zhijun also announced the meeting would occur on 7 November. Sources involved in planning the Ma–Xi meeting revealed that the Taiwanese government informed the United States of this news on the afternoon of 3 November. The original plan was to officially announce the news to the public on the afternoon of 4 November. However, when the news was informed to other Taiwanese political figures and think tank scholars who "needed to know the news in advance" on the evening of 3 November, someone immediately leaked it to the media, forcing the Presidential Office to come forward to confirm the matter in advance.

The final decision on the Ma–Xi meeting was made through Singapore's mediation and Beijing's initiative to invite the meeting, which was scheduled to be held on the afternoon of 7 November 2015 at the Shangri-La Hotel, Singapore. Singapore has always played a key role in the process of promoting cross-strait interaction. The first cross-strait working talks— the Koo-Wang talks —were held in Singapore in April 1993. Singapore Prime Minister Lee Hsien Loong is also considered one of the key figures in facilitating the Xi–Ma meeting. The principle of Taiwan's participation in the meeting was "equality and dignity"; the meeting had no preconditions and did not involve political negotiations; no agreements were signed or joint statements were issued; the meeting was held in a third location outside of the two sides of the Taiwan Strait; it was open and transparent, respected parliamentary supervision, and had no black box operation. The Presidential Office named the special project of this visit "Project Guping", which means "consolidating peace".

== The meeting ==
On 5 November 2015, Xi Jinping, the General Secretary of the CCP, departed from Beijing to Vietnam as his first state visit to the nation at the invitation of General Secretary of the Communist Party of Vietnam, Nguyễn Phú Trọng and President Trương Tấn Sang. On 6 November 2015, coinciding with the 25th anniversary of the establishment of diplomatic relations between the People’s Republic of China and Singapore, Xi Jinping’s Air China special plane arrived at Changi Airport from Vietnam at about 5:30 p.m. to begin his state visit to the island nation together with his wife Peng Liyuan.

Ma Ying-jeou took a chartered flight operated by China Airlines from Taipei Songshan Airport to Singapore on the day of the meeting. His aircraft was escorted by Republic of China Air Force fighter jets. After landing at Singapore Changi Airport at 10:30 am, Ma was then arranged to walk into the air bridge passage. The people who came to pick him up were Huang Meimei, Deputy Director of the Northeast Asia Division of the Ministry of Foreign Affairs of Singapore, and Cedric Foo, Member of Parliament of Singapore. The host of the Taiwanese cable TV program News Digging questioned whether it was unequal. In response, Wang Peiling, spokesperson of Taiwan's Ministry of Foreign Affairs, said that the Singaporean representatives did not come in their personal capacity, but on behalf of the Singapore government. The Taiwanese government thanked and respected Singapore’s arrangements. He then headed to the Four Seasons Hotel briefly where he was greeted by members of the Taiwan Business Association before meeting Xi. Starting at six or seven o'clock on the morning of 7 November, a large number of photographers and videographers lined up in front of the security checkpoint, hoping to be the first to enter the venue. More than 620 reporters were interviewed.

After Xi Jinping concluded his state visit to Singapore, the meeting between the leaders of the two sides of the Taiwan Strait was officially held at the Shangri-La Hotel, Singapore at 3 p.m. on 7 November, Singapore time. Xi Jinping was accompanied by Politburo member and Central Policy Research Office director Wang Huning, Politburo member and General Office director Li Zhanshu, Centeral Foreign Affairs Commission Office director and State Councilor Yang Jiechi, Taiwan Affairs Office director Zhang Zhijun, General Secretary's Office director Ding Xuexiang and Taiwan Affairs Office deputy director Chen Yuanfeng. Ma Ying-jeou was accompanied by Presidential Office secretary-general Tseng Yung-chuan, National Security Council secretary-general Kao Hua-chu, Mainland Affairs Council minister Andrew Hsia, National Security Council advisor Chiu Kun-hsuan, Presidential Office deputy secretary-general Hsiao Hsu-tsen and Mainland Affairs Council deputy minister Wu Mei-hung.

At the scene, the Shangri-La Hotel in Singapore, with the assistance of the Singapore government, removed the national flags and official titles of various countries at the entrance to avoid the appearance of the flag of the People's Republic of China. However, during the international press conference, Ma Ying-jeou's table was decorated with a nameplate bearing the flag of the Republic of China and the title of President. In order to ensure equal status and not distinguish between host and guest, Xi Jinping canceled his original stay at the Shangri-La Hotel in Singapore and changed to the St. Regis Hotel, and then went to the Shangri-La Hotel to attend the meeting. In addition, in Singapore, after receiving Xi Jinping’s state visit earlier, Prime Minister Lee Hsien Loong also invited Ma Ying-jeou to stay for tea after the Ma–Xi meeting and referred to Ma Ying-jeou as President in English on his personal Facebook page.

=== Opening remarks ===
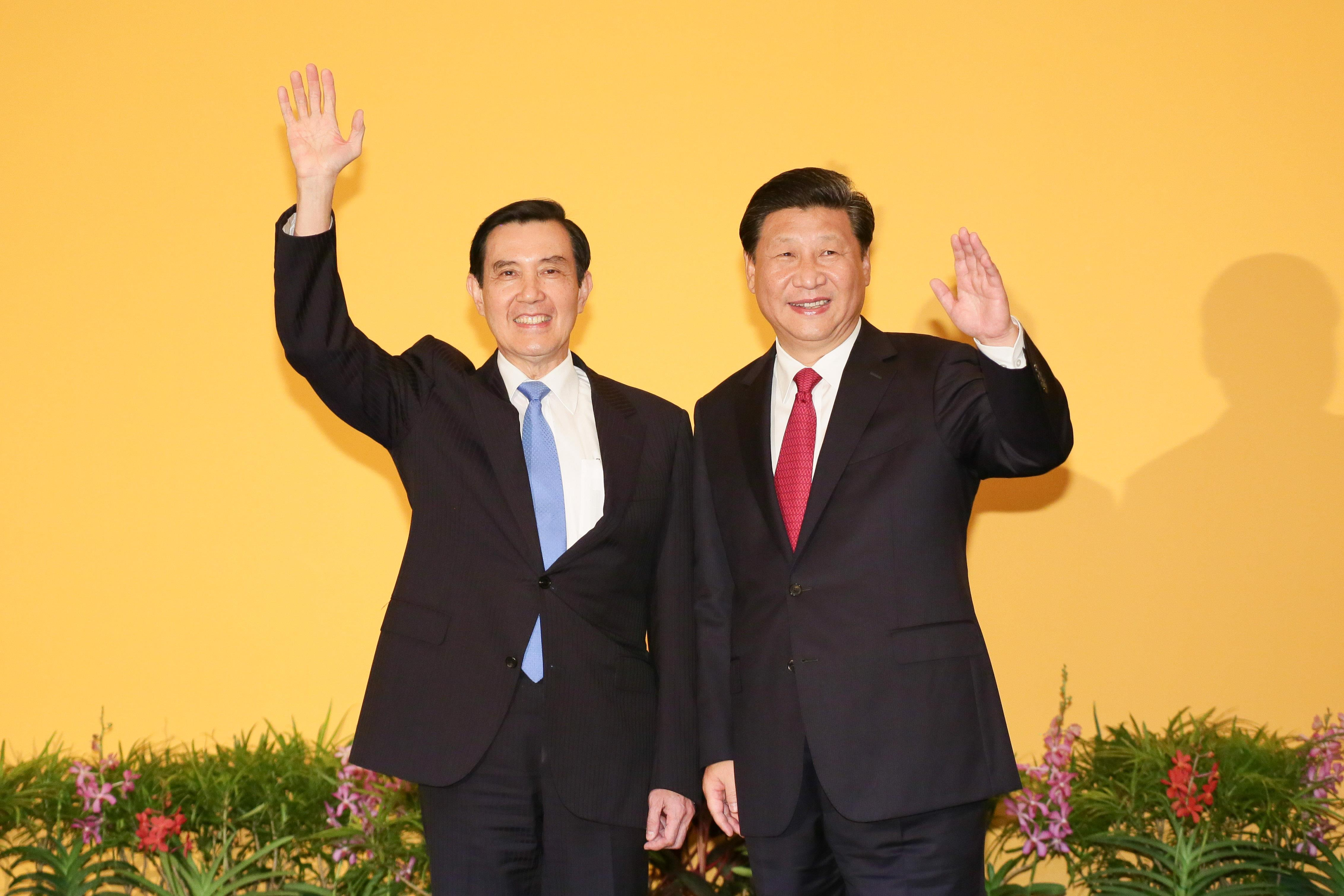
The two leaders waving hands together.

At 3:00 pm Singapore Time, the leaders met at the Shangri-La Hotel Singapore and shook hands in the East Mausoleum Hall of the Island Hall for 1 minute and 20 seconds in front of the assembled press; this was considered the most historic moment of the meeting. After shaking hands, the two moved to Jurong Hall for their meeting, during which the first 10 minutes were open to some media. Xi and Ma respectively gave speeches. With a 30-second delay, the China Central Television (CCTV) broadcast Xi's speech to the PRC and truncated transmission immediately after their president had finished; Ma's speech was not broadcast. However, NetEase, which was carrying the CCTV feed, immediately switched to Phoenix Television to broadcast Ma's speech to the Chinese audience. Xi Jinping mentioned in his speech:

- The two sides of the Taiwan Strait are "brothers whose bones are still connected even if they are broken," and "a family whose blood is thicker than water."
- Compatriots on both sides of the Taiwan Strait should work together and adhere to the 1992 Consensus.
- Let us work together to achieve the great rejuvenation of the Chinese nation.

Ma Ying-jeou put forward five proposals for maintaining peace and prosperity across the Taiwan Strait, among which he mentioned:

- To consolidate the 1992 Consensus and maintain the peaceful status quo, the consensus reached by both sides of the Taiwan Strait in November 1992 on the one China principle is referred to as the 1992 Consensus.
- Agreements on trade in goods, the establishment of mutual offices between the two sides, and transit for mainland tourists should be processed as soon as possible.
- People on both sides of the Taiwan Strait belong to the Chinese nation and are all descendants of Yan and Huang. They should help and cooperate with each other to revitalize China.

The closed-door talks followed at 3:20 pm.

=== Closed-door talks ===
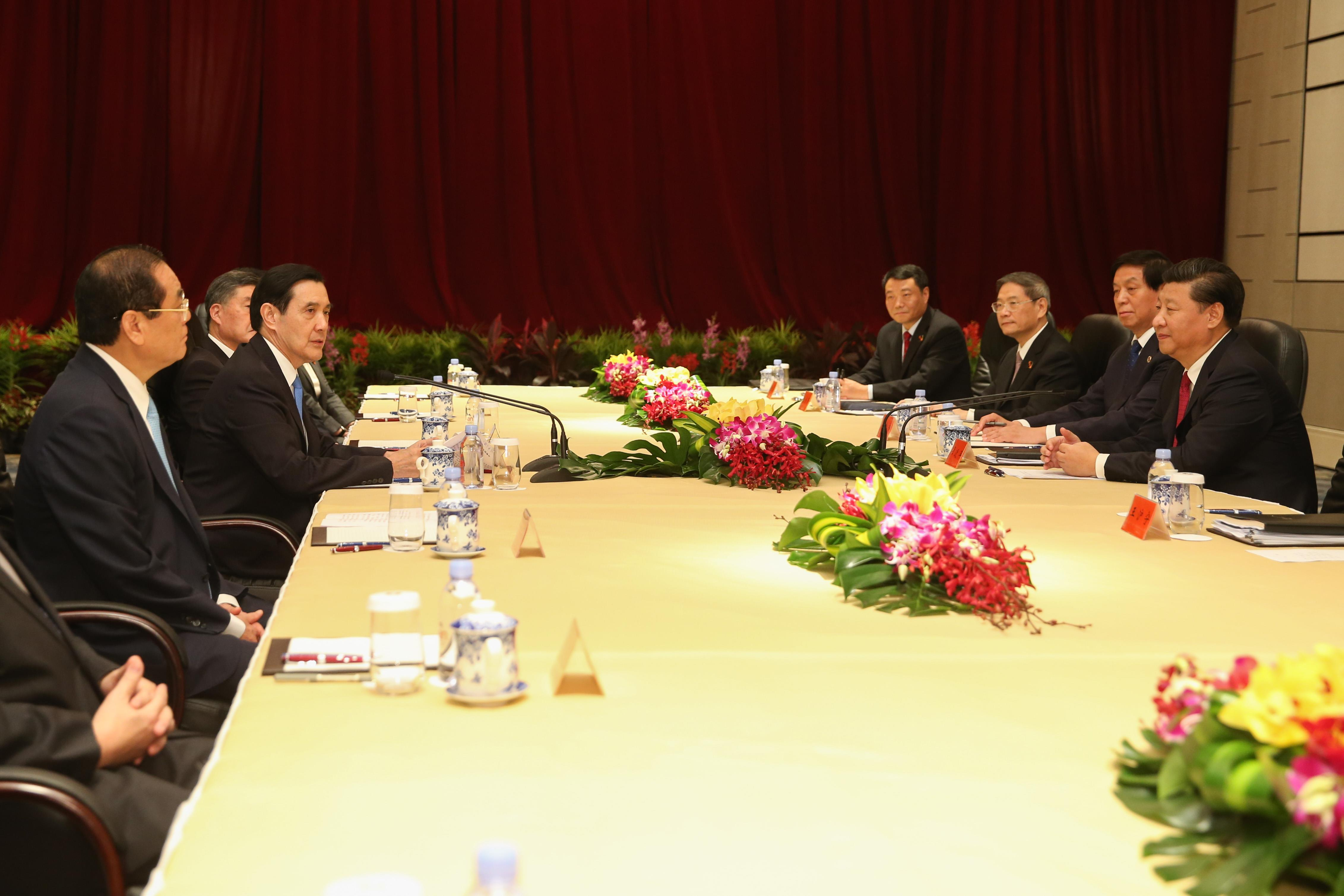
Meeting between Ma Ying-jeou and Xi Jinping after the handshake.

During the closed-door meeting, the two leaders exchanged views on some important issues. Xi Jinping first asked Ma Ying-jeou to express his views. Ma Ying-jeou then elaborated on the five points he had raised earlier. The Mainland Affairs Council issued a press release on 9 November 2015 entitled "Full Text of President Ma's Formal Talks," which mentioned:

- The content of the 1992 Consensus is "one China, different interpretations," and it does not involve two Chinas, one China, one Taiwan, or Taiwan independence, which is not permitted by the Constitution of the Republic of China.
- The issues raised regarding military exercises and missiles at the Zhurihe Training Base, as well as the fact that meaningful participation in the international community is often obstructed, should be addressed to further reduce hostility and confrontation.
- Cooperation will be carried out in historical culture and cross-strait economic and trade matters.
- There is currently no communication mechanism between the Minister of the Mainland Affairs Council and the Director of the Taiwan Affairs Office of the State Council. Establishing such a mechanism would be helpful for both sides in handling the matter.
- Both sides of the Taiwan Strait share common blood ties, history, and culture.

On 11 November 2015, Ma Ying-jeou accepted an interview with TVBS and said that when talking about the Republic of China, Xi Jinping's expression was calm and there was no displeasure. During the meeting, he emphasized to the other party that security and dignity are issues of great concern to the people of Taiwan. He cited the example of the Kinmen shells turning into kitchen knives and advocated that the two sides of the Taiwan Strait should forge swords into plowshares, which would create benefits for the people on both sides. Xi Jinping promised in his response, "You wait and see." The example of the shells turning into kitchen knives touched him deeply. When he was the deputy mayor of Xiamen, the military restricted areas of Xiamen and Kinmen were separated by the sea. On the Xiamen side of the restricted area, although his mayor's car could enter and exit freely, ordinary people could not enter. Later, Kinmen and Xiamen became tourist hotspots on both sides of the Taiwan Strait and became very prosperous. The people on both sides also directly benefited.

According to Taiwan Affairs Office director Zhang Zhijun, Xi Jinping expressed four opinions (four points of insistence): insist on the unwavering common political foundation between the two sides of the Taiwan Strait, that the mainland and Taiwan belong to one country, which has never changed and cannot be changed; insist on consolidating and elevating the peaceful development of cross-strait relations, and regarding Ma Ying-jeou's proposal for cross-strait affairs officials to first establish a hotline to exchange opinions on urgent or important issues, Xi Jinping instructed to "handle it immediately" and stated that establishing a hotline would help both sides communicate in a timely manner, avoid misjudgments, and handle urgent issues; insist on working together to seek more benefits for compatriots on both sides of the Taiwan Strait, and regarding Taiwan's economic and trade participation, Xi Jinping expressed his welcome for Taiwan to join and proposed to strengthen cross-strait cultural and educational exchanges and cooperation; and also insist on working together to realize the great rejuvenation of the Chinese nation. In addition, Xi Jinping mentioned during the meeting that the Zhurihe Training Base and missile deployment in Inner Mongolia were not aimed at Taiwan. Ma Ying-jeou said in an interview after the meeting that he was not very satisfied with this answer.

Both sides affirmed the important achievements made in the peaceful development of cross-strait relations since 2008. Both sides believe that they should continue to adhere to the 1992 Consensus, consolidate the common political foundation, promote the peaceful development of cross-strait relations, maintain peace and stability in the Taiwan Strait, strengthen communication and dialogue, expand cross-strait exchanges, deepen mutual cooperation, achieve mutual benefit and win-win results, and benefit compatriots on both sides of the strait. The people on both sides of the strait belong to the Chinese nation and are all descendants of Yan and Huang. They should work together to revitalize China and rejuvenate the nation. The establishment of a hotline for cross-strait affairs will help both sides communicate in a timely manner, avoid misjudgments, and handle urgent issues. Both sides can expedite discussions on issues such as trade in goods and the establishment of offices by the two associations, and strive to reach an agreement as soon as possible. Xi Jinping expressed his understanding of the thoughts and feelings of Taiwan compatriots on participating in international activities and attached importance to and promoted the resolution of many related issues. As long as it does not create "two Chinas" or "one China, one Taiwan", both sides of the strait can make reasonable arrangements through pragmatic consultations.

==== Official interpretations ====
President Ma Ying-jeou said he believed that the exchange of views between the two sides has attracted global attention and has a "symbolic significance" as a historical milestone; on the other hand, its specific content and conclusions cover key issues between the two sides and have "substantive significance". He said the discussion of the 1992 Consensus between the leaders of the two sides on such occasions can be regarded as another important milestone in cross-strait relations. He promoted the meeting between the leaders of the two sides, "which is also to pave the way for the next president, no matter where he comes from." The two sides have reached a consensus on ensuring the stability and status quo of the Taiwan Strait at the meeting. He said "The bridge has been built and anyone can get on the bridge as long as he abides by the traffic rules." Taiwanese Premier Mao Chi-kuo said that this meeting demonstrates the objective fact of the existence of the Republic of China, namely, "the two sides do not recognize each other's sovereignty, nor do they deny each other's governing authority", which helps to consolidate the peaceful status quo across the Taiwan Strait for more than seven years and build a more stable institutionalized cross-strait relationship; the "Ma–Xi meeting" is also a major historical milestone in the development of cross-strait relations after 66 years of separation across the sea since 1949.

Taiwan Affairs Office director Zhang Zhijun introduced that this meeting is a reaffirmation of the 1992 Consensus which embodies the one-China principle as a common political foundation, which is of great significance to the future stable development of cross-strait relations; it also shows the world that Chinese people on both sides of the strait are fully capable and wise enough to solve their own problems. The Mainland Affairs Council stated that this meeting laid the foundation for a regular exchange mechanism between leaders of both sides of the Taiwan Strait in the future, and was an important beginning for the further institutionalization of cross-strait relations. It will help to solidify the institutionalized regular interaction model between the two sides and enhance mutual trust between them. Mainland Affairs Minister Andrew Hsia introduced that this meeting maintained "peace across the Taiwan Strait", created a historical model for the stability of the Taiwan Strait and the region, deepened the institutional development of cross-strait relations, and enhanced mutual trust between the two sides. During the meeting between the leaders of the two sides, Ma Ying-jeou fully explained the meaning of "1992 Consensus, One China with Different Interpretations", fully demonstrating the sovereignty of the Republic of China and safeguarding the dignity of Taiwan, and maintaining the status quo of the Taiwan Strait. He said Ma Ying-jeou was also the first president to speak to the mainland leaders about the Republic of China, the Constitution of the Republic of China, the 1992 Consensus, One China with Different Interpretations, and the fact that the two sides of the Taiwan Strait were separated by the sea, prompting the mainland to face up to the fact that the Republic of China exists.

=== Post-meeting press conference ===
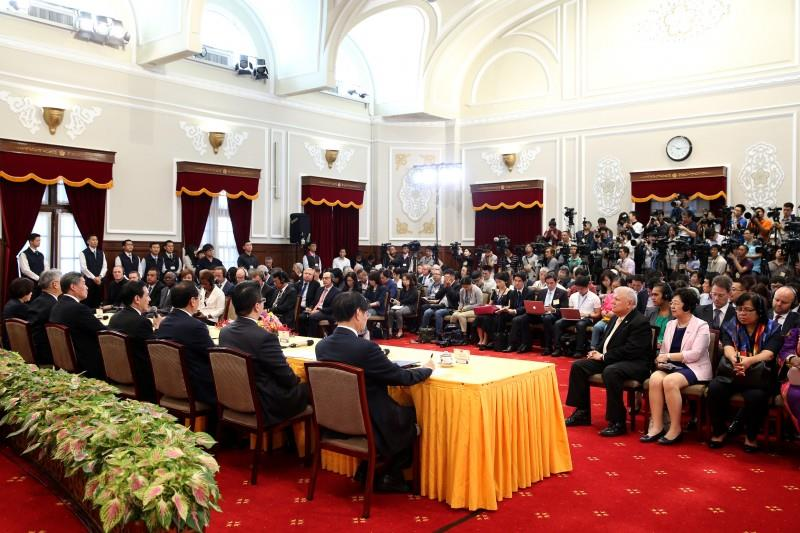
Post-meeting press conference from Taiwan side.

Following the meeting, both sides held separate 30-minute press conferences. The mainland side held its conference first, led by Taiwan Affairs Office Director Zhang Zhijun. Zhang conveyed words from Xi that the meeting was a new page in history for cross-strait relations. He reiterated Xi's four points to Ma, which are adhering to the 1992 Consensus, developing cross-strait peace, expanding the effects of the prosperity to more public segments and cooperatively pursuing the Chinese renaissance. Zhang added that Xi agreed to establish the cross-strait hotline that can help both sides communicate with each other, avoid miscalculation and also to deal during emergencies and important matters. Taiwan's participation in the Asian Infrastructure Investment Bank was also encouraged. Xi told Ma that both sides are one family, emphasizing the same cultural and blood lineages of both sides of the Taiwan Strait and the improved relations over the past seven years. Ma told Xi that both sides should respect each other's value and way of life, and stating his five remarks, which are consolidating the 1992 Consensus, downgrading tension by solving problems peacefully and establishing cooperative efforts to revitalize the Chinese nation.

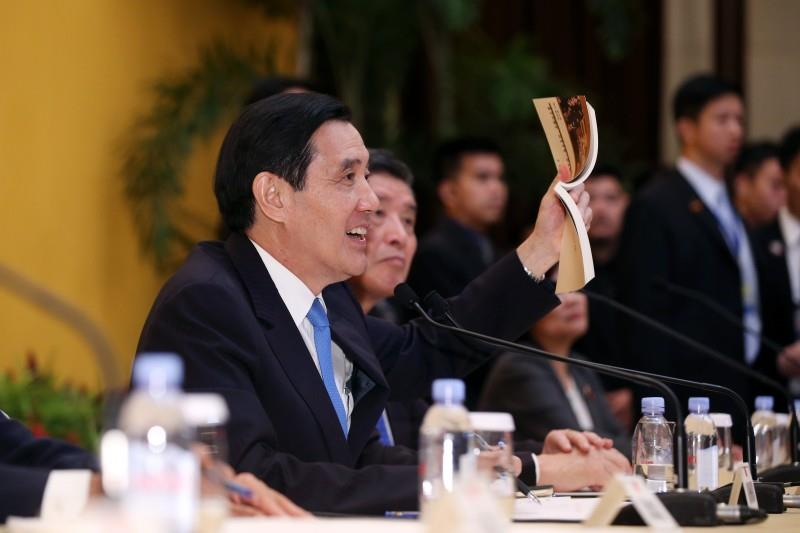
Ma Ying-jeou holds an international press conference after the meeting.

Ma began a press conference at 4:50 pm, during which he highlighted the importance of the fine details of the 1992 Consensus. At Ma Ying-jeou's international press conference, a table card with the ROC flag and the title "President" was placed on it. Scholar Chen Yixin pointed out that this would not have been possible without the basis of "mutual non-denial of governance" between the two sides of the Taiwan Strait. At the press conference, Ma Ying-jeou answered questions about the mainland's missile deployment against Taiwan, the establishment of cross-strait hotlines, mainland students going to Taiwan for undergraduate studies, and Taiwan's international participation. He also made part of the discussion content of the closed-door meeting public. Pointing out that the atmosphere of the meeting was harmonious, Ma said that Xi's words were conducive to the practicalities of cross-strait matters. He said that both sides talked about consolidating the 1992 Consensus, and adherence to the One-China policy, but maintained that both sides are free to interpret its meaning. However, he mentioned that the 1992 Consensus was reached on the basis of "different interpretation" of "One China", not "two Chinas, one China and one Taiwan, or Taiwan independence," none of which are permitted under the ROC Constitution.

=== Dinner ===
At 5:30 p.m., the leaders from both leaders had dinner at the hotel. The dinner included cold dishes such as sliced pork with gold foil, abalone slices and crispy melon with flavored sauce, hot dishes such as Hunan-style stir-fried lobster with green garlic, grouper with bamboo leaves and XO glutinous rice, Hangzhou-style Dongpo pork and stir-fried asparagus with lily bulbs. The staple food was Sichuan Dan Dan noodles, and the desserts were osmanthus sugar snow frog dumplings and fruit platter. Regarding the wines served at the banquet, the Taiwanese side brought two bottles of 58-degree premium Kinmen Kaoliang liquor produced by Kinmen Distillery on 27 September 1990; Kinmen was site of the Battle of Guningtou during the Chinese Civil War and the First and Second Taiwan Strait Crises, representing the state of cross-strait exchanges turning from war to peace. They also had eight jars of Matsu Laojiu; the mainland Chinese side brought Guizhou Maotai liquor. The two Kaoliang wine bottles presented by Kao Hua-chu (ROC) were produced in 1990, the year the Kinmen Agreement was signed. They also drank moutai, and rice wine produced in Matsu.

Ma Ying-jeou mentioned to Xi Jinping his statement, "I have served as President of the Republic of China for seven years." Xi Jinping also said to Ma Ying-jeou, "Was your Presidential Office Building the same as the Governor-General's Office during the Japanese occupation?" They split the bill upon finishing the meal. Xi and Ma sat next to each other at a round table to avoid having someone sitting in the host position at the head of a rectangular table. To Xi Jinping's left, in order, were Tseng Yung-chuan, Li Zhanshu, Andrew Hsia, Zhang Zhijun, Hsiao Hsu-tsen, Chen Yuan- feng, Wu Mei-hung, Ting Hsueh-hsiang, Chiu Kun-hsuan, Yang Jiechi, Kao Hua-chu, and Wang Huning. The cost of the banquet was split equally between the two parties. When Tseng Yung-chuan, then Secretary-General of the Presidential Office, toasted Xi Jinping, he did not address him by his official title of "General Secretary" or "President of the State," but when he toasted Ma Ying-jeou, he addressed him as "President." Gifts were also exchanged. Xi Jinping gave Ma Ying-jeou an artwork by mainland Chinese painter Liu Dawei (simplified Chinese: 刘大为; traditional Chinese: 劉大爲). Xi received a ceramic Formosan blue magpie by Lee Kuo-chin (traditional Chinese: 李國欽; simplified Chinese: 李国钦, Lǐ Guóqīn) from Ma, meant to exemplify the uniqueness of Taiwan.

=== Return trip ===
At 7:20 p.m., the banquet ended, and Xi Jinping and Ma Ying-jeou went to Changi Airport to catch their flights back to Beijing and Taipei respectively. Before leaving, Ma Ying-jeou had a tea party with Singapore Prime Minister Lee Hsien Loong at the latter's invitation. At 8 p.m., Xi Jinping's plane took off first, and after Ma Ying-jeou finished his meeting with Lee Hsien Loong, his plane took off at 9 p.m.

== Reactions ==
=== Republic of China (Taiwan) ===
==== Government and the Kuomintang ====
Kuomintang legislator Lai Shyh-bao conducting a press conference on the eve of the meeting.

During an international news conference prior to the meeting, President Ma said that the two sides of the Taiwan Strait should continue to mitigate their animosity, avoid deviating from the right path and expand exchanges and cooperation. He asserted that the meeting was not for his legacy or for improving the popularity of the Kuomintang, but for the good of the next generation. Foreign Minister David Lin said the Ma–Xi meeting will focus on cross-strait peace and stability without involving any political negotiations nor leading to any downgrading of Taiwan's status, but that it would be held under the principle of equality and dignity with proper courtesy. The Kuomintang described the meeting as a "milestone" in Cross-Strait relations.

Vice President Wu Den-yih said at the event that the Xi–Ma meeting could reduce the hostility between the two sides of the Taiwan Strait. Minister of Economic Affairs John Deng said that the Xi–Ma meeting would be helpful for joining the Trans-Pacific Partnership (TPP) and the Regional Comprehensive Economic Partnership (RCEP). Minister of Finance Chang Sheng-ford and Financial Supervisory Commission chairman Tseng Ming-chung believed that the Xi–Ma meeting would help the future economic development of both sides of the Taiwan Strait. Foreign Minister David Lin said in response to a question from the Legislative Yuan’s National Defense and Foreign Affairs Committee that the international community views the "Xi–Ma meeting" in a positive and affirmative way. He added that the main theme of the trip is to consolidate peace and maintain the status quo, which is in line with everyone’s expectations. He also said that the meeting itself represents a positive development and that the Xi–Ma meeting should make APEC "smoother". Kuomintang Chairman and presidential candidate Eric Chu stated that the meeting between leaders from both sides of the Taiwan Strait is a very important milestone for cross-strait relations. Chu indicated that if elected president, he would be willing to continue meeting with Xi Jinping. Lin Yi-hua, chairman of the Kuomintang's Cultural and Communications Committee, also stated that based on the 1992 Consensus, the meeting between leaders from both sides should be a major watershed moment in the transition from resolving confrontation to peaceful development of cross-strait relations, marking a significant step towards a stage of cooperation and mutual benefit.

On the evening of 3 November 2015, at around 11 p.m., Legislative Yuan president Wang Jin-pyng was preparing to go to bed when he was asked by the media and learned of the matter. He issued a statement expressing his support for any dialogue that is conducive to cross-strait peace and regional stability. He said that the public is highly concerned about cross-strait relations and hopes that this meeting will meet the expectations of the people and be successfully completed. He also said that the meeting between the leaders of the two sides must be based on equality and dignity. On 4 November, Kuomintang legislator Ting Shou-chung stated on Facebook that in the field of international politics, the whole world supports replacing confrontation with negotiation and resolving differences through communication, which is a universally recognized good thing. On the same day, the Kuomintang caucus in the Legislative Yuan expressed its support for the Ma–Xi meeting, launched a petition, and held a press conference to refute the "black box" claim. Lai Shih-pao, executive director of the Kuomintang Policy Committee, said that the Ma–Xi meeting was held on Saturday, and the Executive Yuan reported to the Legislative Yuan three days earlier, which complied with the oversight regulations. Kuomintang legislator Lin Yu-fang criticized the DPP: "Both sides are equal in dignity, what are the DPP yelling about?"

On 7 November, Ma Ying-jeou relayed Xi Jinping's statement at a press conference following the conclusion of the cross-strait leaders' meeting: "The missile deployment is not aimed at Taiwan." On 9 November, Major General Luo Shaohe, military spokesperson for the Ministry of National Defense of the Republic of China, stated at a regular press conference: "China's military deployment against Taiwan is a fact and a phenomenon," and expressed: "We hope to demonstrate goodwill towards Taiwan."

==== Democratic Progressive Party ====
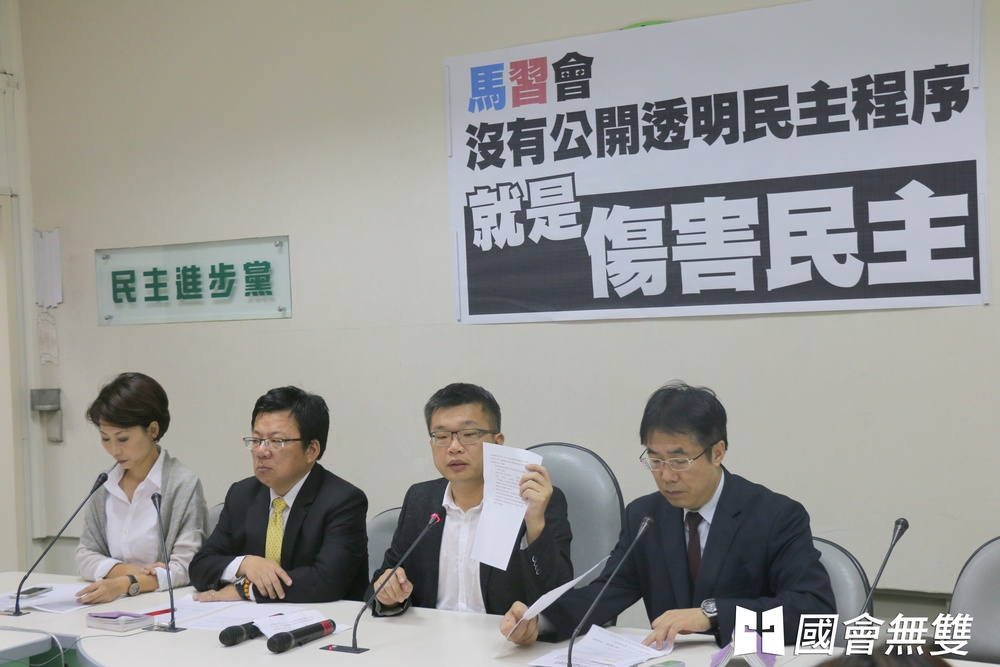
The DPP legislative caucus held a press conference to condemn the Ma-Xi meeting.

Presidential candidate and incumbent chairwoman of the Democratic Progressive Party (DPP) (and eventually Ma's successor as president) Tsai Ing-wen called the proposed meeting a manipulation of the January elections and described the decision-making process as opaque. She added that the meeting has caused a wave of questions and public doubts as people have grown to mistrust the administration's plan for cross-strait relations. The Liberty Times echoed Tsai's concerns that parliament and the public had been excluded from the decision-making. After the meeting, Tsai criticized President Ma for making no reference to preserving Taiwan's democracy and freedom. She maintained that only the upcoming elections can decide Taiwan's future. She said "President Ma Ying-jeou is about to leave office, and the people of Taiwan will absolutely not allow him to limit Taiwan's future for personal political gain as he prepares to leave office. He has no right to make promises he cannot fulfill. Furthermore, a meeting between leaders from both sides of the Taiwan Strait is a major event involving Taiwan's dignity and national interests. Letting the people know this in such a chaotic and hasty manner is detrimental to Taiwan's democratic politics." She also emphasized that Taiwan's future cannot be used as a temporary election tactic, proposing three principles: "equal dignity," "openness and transparency," and "no political preconditions." She also stated that if elected, she would not rule out meeting with Xi Jinping under these three principles. In addition, Tsai Ing-wen also stated on Facebook that "the president should represent the country and the people in foreign affairs and must embody the common will of the people. However, President Ma's performance at the Ma–Xi meeting yesterday disappointed and even angered many people. Because, for the people of Taiwan, the only 'historical record' left by the Ma–Xi meeting in the international community is President Ma's self-satisfied handshake. Taiwan's democracy was completely absent from beginning to end, and the existence of the Republic of China was nowhere to be seen." She also pointed out that Taiwan's strong backing is the votes in the hands of the people. She encouraged the people of Taiwan to "replace this regime with their votes" in next year's general election. Tsai Ing-wen also stated that if elected president, she would not rule out arranging a "Tsai-Xi meeting" under the three principles of "open and transparent information, equal dignity, and no political preconditions".

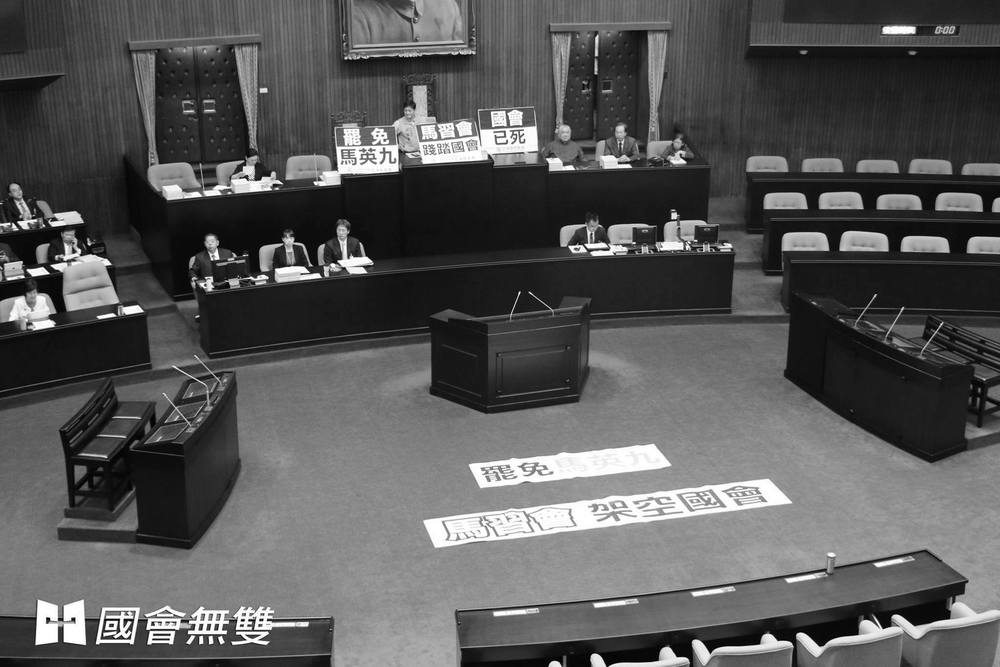
The Legislative Yuan's plenary session was boycotted by the Democratic Progressive Party due to the Ma–Xi meeting.

DPP spokesperson Cheng Yun-peng stated that this is a serious matter, and the timing is open to discussion; "Ma Ying-jeou must clearly explain the situation to the public. During his re-election campaign, Ma promised not to meet with Chinese leaders for four years, yet now a meeting hastily and secretly has been arranged. What is the nature of the Ma–Xi meeting? What is its purpose? Why the rush? What will the format and arrangements be? What will he say and do? Ma also stated that the Ma–Xi meeting must be conducted "under the needs of the nation, with the support of the people, and under the supervision of the legislature," yet the public was only informed of it in a surprise manner just before departure. This again highlights the Ma administration's habitual disregard for democracy, avoidance of oversight, and "black box operations," which is unacceptable to the people." Ker Chien-ming, the DPP caucus whip in the Legislative Yuan, said that neither he nor the DPP caucus had received prior notification from the executive branch or Legislative Yuan Speaker Wang Jin-pyng that Premier Mao Chi-kuo and Presidential Office Secretary-General Tseng Yung-chuan would be visiting Wang Jin-pyng today. He expressed his strong protest on behalf of the DPP caucus against President Ma Ying-jeou’s secretive and opaque actions. He also believed that this was a political framework unilaterally agreed upon by the KMT and the CCP, which the people of Taiwan could not accept. When interviewed by the radio, DPP Secretary-General Wu Chao-hsieh criticized Ma Ying-jeou for "operating in secrecy" and said that Ma Ying-jeou’s visit to Singapore to meet with Xi Jinping on the occasion of the 25th anniversary of the establishment of diplomatic relations between Singapore and the mainland may be harmful to Taiwan. However, he also said that the DPP would not organize a group to protest in Singapore and would not "oppose China at every turn". The DPP would monitor the Ma–Xi meeting in Taiwan.

On 4 November, DPP legislator Huang Wei-che said that the Ma–Xi meeting was like a Singaporean version of the "September 3rd military parade," meaning Ma Ying-jeou was being inspected by Xi Jinping. The Presidential Office claimed that no agreements would be signed, so what was the purpose of the meeting? Was it merely for historical recognition? Is this the level of Ma Ying-jeou expected? Huang Wei-che urged Ma Ying-jeou not to sign any agreements or discuss any concrete plans without authorization. On 5 November, DPP legislator Chen Ting-fei criticized President Ma Ying-jeou for not following standard operating procedures in handling the Ma–Xi meeting, which was completely unacceptable to the people. She urged Ma to immediately "pull back from the brink," explain clearly to the people and the legislature, and accept supervision. She stressed that the Ma–Xi meeting had a huge backlash from the people and would have a great negative impact on the Kuomintang's general election next year.' On 6 November, DPP legislator Chen Chi-mai released a poll report obtained from the Mainland Affairs Council after President Ma Ying-jeou’s international press conference on the Ma–Xi meeting. He posted that "even the poll is a black box" and accused the poll of being "a huge lie!"

==== Third parties ====
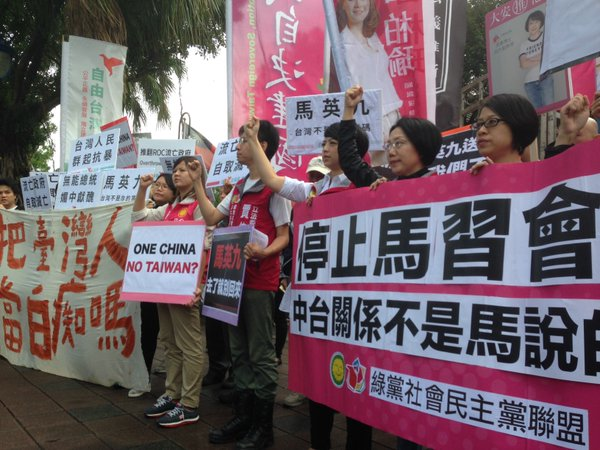
Supporters of the Green Party-Social Democratic Party Alliance and the Free Taiwan Party protest against Ma Ying-jeou and the Ma-Xi meeting outside the Legislative Yuan.

Huang Kun-huei, chairman of the Taiwan Solidarity Union (TSU), pointed out that President Ma broke his promise, sacrificed Taiwan's interests for personal fame, and conducted the meeting in secrecy, disregarding the parliament and trampling on the people. He ordered the TSU caucus to boycott the meeting and never endorse it. The youth division of the TSU, formerly the third largest political party in Taiwan, threw colored smoke bombs over the cordons surrounding the Presidential Office Building and holding signs that read "The Ma–Xi meeting is a black box meeting, and the KMT and the CCP are selling out Taiwan." They shouted slogans to oppose the Ma–Xi meeting and were immediately arrested by the police and taken to the police station for further interrogation. Its spiritual leader, Lee Teng-hui, said that Ma Ying-jeou's term has ended, but the agreement on cross-strait relations will not be left to the next president to arrange. On 4 November, the TSU Legislative Yuan caucus held a press conference to criticize Ma's announcement late on 3 November that he would go to Singapore for the "Ma–Xi meeting" as "unseemly". Among them, the caucus whip Lai Chen-chang said that the "Ma–Xi meeting" is a meeting between our country's head of state, which is a very serious matter, but our Ma Ying-jeou has made it like a secret affair between young lovers. Deputy caucus whip Yeh Chin-ling said that Taiwan can no longer tolerate the Kuomintang and that they should get out of Taiwan.

New Power Party (NPP) Chairman Huang Kuo-chang expressed strong protest on Facebook, accused Ma of attempting to burnish his legacy at the expense of changing the direction of national security policy, and trampling on Taiwan's democracy and sovereignty by bypassing the Legislative Yuan. He argued that Ma's trip would violate his 2011 promises in which Ma said that he would not meet with Chinese leaders if re-elected. He also called on the public to protest in front of the Legislative Yuan. Social Democratic Party chairman Fan Yun said "Ma doesn't have any mandate for surprising us with this meeting – ever since last year's Sunflower Movement, it has been clear that the handling of cross-strait relations by the governing party is not trusted by the people." She said that President Ma’s actions violated the oath under Article 48 of the Constitution, and that the trip had no basis in popular opinion. She demanded that Kuomintang Chairman Eric Chu expel Ma from the party. Green Party Taiwan co-convener Lee Ken-cheng added it was not clear whether Ma had made concessions to arrange the meeting. Lee further stated that calling a meeting about 70 days before the general elections, made it "obvious that China wants to use this to interfere with Taiwan's elections." The Green Society protested against Ma Ying-jeou's attack on the people of Taiwan on the night of 3 November, saying that he suddenly announced the Ma–Xi meeting a few days before the trip, completely keeping the legislature in the dark. They filed complaints against Ma Ying-jeou for treason with foreign powers at the Supreme Court Prosecutor's Office and the High Prosecutor's Office. Lawyers Li Yanrong and Zhan Shungui said that the meeting and negotiation between the leaders of the two sides of the Taiwan Strait involves national sovereignty and should be supervised by the legislature in advance. They said Ma Ying-jeou made an appointment to meet with Xi Jinping, the leader of mainland China, without going through the relevant procedures of the Legislative Yuan, which they said clearly violated Articles 104, 113 and 114 of the Criminal Code, and that his exit from the country should be restricted.

James Soong, chairman of the People First Party and presidential candidate, said that he believed the meeting between Ma and Xi as leaders of both sides of the Taiwan Strait will help deepen cross-strait exchanges. However, he also criticized the lack of transparency in the process and questioned whether Ma and Xi had made any private promises. He said he believed that the Ma government should explain this clearly to the ruling and opposition parties and the public. New Party Chairman Yok Mu-ming wrote to the China Times, saying that Ma Ying-jeou had taken the right path and called on all presidential candidates to visit mainland China. He also criticized Tsai Ing-wen for not being qualified to criticize Ma Ying-jeou for "doing things behind closed doors". Hsu Hsin-ying, chairperson of the Minkuotang and vice-presidential candidate, said that she was pleased to see President Ma Ying-jeou meet with Xi Jinping in a dignified manner, but she also raised three questions: "Is President Ma Ying-jeou doing this for himself or for the 23 million people of Taiwan?"; Why not "open the door and take the main road", causing public doubts. At the same time, she also questioned DPP Chairperson Tsai Ing-wen: If Tsai is elected president, will she meet with the mainland leaders? If she does meet, what identity and form will she use? If she does not meet, what platform will the DPP use to maintain cross-strait peace?

Former Kuomintang legislator and now independent Chi Kuo-tung criticized Ma Ying-jeou’s behavior as going to see his lover without his parents’ consent, comparing it to "eloping". Taipei Mayor Ko Wen-je said that Ma Ying-jeou's mention of the One China principle at the meeting was "sick". He also believed that since the mainland's Taiwan Affairs Office Director Zhang Zhijun held the press conference, Ma Ying-jeou should have asked Andrew Hsia to hold it. He also said that the 1992 Consensus was ambiguous and did not solve the problem. He quoted the Diamond Sutra, "One should abide nowhere and give rise to the mind", to comment that one should not meet for the sake of meeting. However, he did not deny that the Ma–Xi meeting would help reduce cross-strait hostility.

==== Civil society ====
The Chinese National Federation of Industries, Taipei Chamber of Commerce, and Allied Association for Science Park Industries, all of which are Taiwanese business organizations, expressed support for the meeting, which is perceived to help improve Taiwan's economic prospects. Others such as a number of intellectuals and legal experts in Taiwan published articles calling on the Legislative Yuan to initiate impeachment proceedings against Ma, as they argue the handling of the meeting has violated the requirements of the due Constitutional procedures. Some scholars also asked for the intervention of the legislative body and the Constitutional Court to prevent Ma from attending the meeting. On the summit day, hundreds of angry protesters walked along a three-kilometer route from the Ministry of Economic Affairs building to the Presidential Office, condemning Ma's warm exchange with many fearing that Taiwan's democracy is being excessively influenced by China. "I believe this is getting to the level of treason." said Lin Hsiu-hsin, vice chairman of the Taiwan Association of University Professors. Protests also occurred at the Legislative Yuan and Taipei Songshan Airport.

==== Public opinion ====
On 6 November 2015, before the Ma–Xi meeting, a poll was released by the Cross-Strait Policy Association showing that 56.7% of the public supported a meeting between leaders from both sides of the Taiwan Strait; the support rate for the "Ma–Xi meeting" was 43.9%, while 32.2% of the public disapproved, with those under 40 years old mostly holding a critical attitude. This contradictory phenomenon can be inferred from the public's distrust of Ma Ying-jeou himself, which greatly reduced the support rate for the Ma–Xi meeting. On 9 November, a poll was released after the "Ma–Xi meeting" showing that 48.5% of the public were dissatisfied with Ma Ying-jeou's performance, while 39.6% of the public were satisfied. 46.8% of the respondents believed that Ma Ying-jeou did not safeguard the sovereignty and interests of the Republic of China, while 32.9% of the respondents believed that he did safeguard sovereignty. In the presidential election, Tsai Ing-wen's support remained in the lead, rising slightly by 3.4 percentage points from 45.2% in the 18 October survey to 48.6%; Eric Chu's support was 21.4%, about the same as the previous 21.9%; while James Soong's support dropped to 8.3%, down 5.5 percentage points from the previous survey; the proportion of respondents who did not express an opinion increased by 8%.

A public opinion poll by the Kuomintang Legislative Yuan caucus after the Ma–Xi meeting shows that 46.1% of respondents approve of the Ma–Xi meeting, while 21% disapprove. According to an ETtoday poll, after the Ma–Xi meeting, 46% of the public believed it would help stabilize cross-strait peace, while 39.3% believed it would not. After the Ma–Xi meeting, according to a Sanlih News poll, 34.9% of the public were dissatisfied with Ma Ying-jeou's performance at the meeting, 26.4% were satisfied, and 38.7% did not express their opinion. In addition, 43.3% of the public believed that the Ma–Xi meeting would help cross-strait peace, while 36.7% believed that it would not help. After the Ma–Xi meeting, the support of DPP presidential candidate Tsai Ing-wen rose significantly to 46.7%, far ahead of KMT's Eric Chu (19.0%) and PFP's James Soong (11.4%), which remained at a low level. TISR Taiwan Index poll showed that after the Ma–Xi meeting, 73% of the public supported regular meetings between leaders across the Taiwan Strait, regardless of which party is in power (president), while 14.5% expressed disapproval. Through cross-analysis, 88.3% of the public with a pan-blue political leaning supported the meeting, and 68.9% of the public with a pan-green political leaning supported it. 30.2% of the public believed that Ma Ying-jeou had done a good job in defending our country's sovereignty and dignity, while 52.7% believed that he had not done so; in addition, 56.2% believed that Ma Ying-jeou could not represent the opinions of the respondents.

On 18 November, the New Taiwan Policy Research Institute released a telephone poll conducted by Trend Survey Company, showing that 54.8% of the public were dissatisfied with Ma Ying-jeou's performance at the Ma–Xi meeting, while 30.4% were satisfied. 64.3% of the public disagreed with the one-China principle proposed by Ma Ying-jeou, while 22.9% agreed. 56.0% of the public were worried that Taiwan would become part of China after the Ma–Xi meeting, while 38.8% said they were not worried. Regarding Xi Jinping's statement that "the missile deployment is comprehensive and not targeted at the people of Taiwan," 72.8% of the public did not believe Xi Jinping's response to the missile deployment, while 18.5% said they believed him. After the Ma–Xi meeting, 62.4% of the public were dissatisfied with the Kuomintang's performance, while 19.6% were satisfied. 42.0% of the public were satisfied with the DPP's performance, while 37.8% were dissatisfied. Regarding the public's self-identity and stance on unification or independence, after the Ma–Xi meeting, the proportion of people who identified as Taiwanese was 87%, and the proportion of people who identified as Chinese was 6.1%. The proportions of people who believed that Taiwan should be independent or unified in the future were 61.4% and 12.3% respectively, which did not change much overall. Among them, 98.0% of people aged 20–29 identified as Taiwanese and only 2% identified as Chinese. 80% of young people aged 20–29 believed that Taiwan should be independent in the future, which was higher than 70% in September of this year.

=== People's Republic of China (Mainland) ===
Yu Zhengsheng, the Chairman of the National Committee of the Chinese People's Political Consultative Conference, said at the Zijinshan Summit of Cross-Strait Entrepreneurs in Nanjing that the "Xi–Ma meeting" will be held in Singapore on 7 November, which is an important positive news for enterprises on both sides of the strait. Taiwan Affairs director Zhang Zhijun said that this was the first meeting between leaders from both sides of the Taiwan Strait since 1949, which would elevate cross-strait exchanges to a new level and open up new prospects for the development of cross-strait relations. Hua Chunying, spokesperson for the Ministry of Foreign Affairs, said at a regular press conference that maintaining peaceful development of cross-strait relations is in the interests of both sides of the Taiwan Strait and is also conducive to regional and global peace and stability.

Zheng Jianbang, the eldest grandson of the anti-Japanese war hero Zheng Dongguo and vice chairman of the Revolutionary Committee of the Chinese Kuomintang, said on 6 November that "the Xi–Ma meeting is a milestone breakthrough in the history of cross-strait relations, which will enhance the confidence of people on both sides of the strait in the peaceful development of cross-strait relations and promote the deepening development of cross-strait relations on the basis of the one-China principle." He said, "In the past seven years, cross-strait relations have greatly eased. The fact that the leaders of both sides of the strait sat down together to discuss the present and future of cross-strait relations is itself a significant event." Huang Zhixian, a member of the Standing Committee of the National Committee of the Chinese People's Political Consultative Conference and executive vice chairman of the Taiwan Democratic Self-Government League, said in an interview with China News Service in Beijing on 6 November regarding the Xi–Ma meeting, "We feel that cross-strait relations have truly taken a big step forward." Wu Guozhen, vice chairman of the Taiwan Democratic Self-Government League, said in an interview that the Xi–Ma meeting was a "major move" at a critical moment, and that cross-strait relations should achieve mutual benefit and win-win results. Yang Yizhou, vice president of the All-China Federation of Taiwan Compatriots, also said in an interview that the meeting between leaders from both sides of the Taiwan Strait is an important milestone in consolidating the achievements of cross-strait relations and creating a better future. It is the common expectation of compatriots on both sides of the Taiwan Strait and will surely be recorded in history.

Zhu Weidong, deputy director of the Institute of Taiwan Studies at the Chinese Academy of Social Sciences, said in a telephone interview with a reporter from China News Service on 4 November that "'The Xi–Ma meeting' will send a clear and powerful signal to people at home and abroad, namely that all parties on both sides of the Taiwan Strait should do their utmost to safeguard the overall situation of peaceful development across the Taiwan Strait built on the basis of the '1992 Consensus' and opposition to 'Taiwan independence,' do their utmost to safeguard the political positioning and cooperation foundation of both sides of the Taiwan Strait belonging to one China, and will never allow any force inside or outside the island to obstruct or undermine this status quo and development process." Ni Yongjie, Executive Deputy Director of the Shanghai Institute of Taiwan Studies and Editor-in-Chief of Taiwan Strait Studies, stated that economic globalization and cross-strait economic integration are inevitable trends and should be viewed positively. Clinging to outdated practices or circumventing the large mainland Chinese market will make it difficult for Taiwan's economy to find a way forward. Ni believes that Taiwan should adopt an open attitude and complement the mainland's strengths, such as combining relevant industrial chains on both sides, establishing a clear division of labor, and leveraging Taiwan's advantages in talent and service industries to achieve common development across the Taiwan Strait. Tang Yonghong, director of the Institute of Economics at the Taiwan Research Institute of Xiamen University, also believes that cross-strait economic exchanges can only form a cooperative pattern of mutual interdependence and common interests if they are open to each other on an equal footing. He also said, "Currently, mainland investment in Taiwan is still subject to many restrictions, and Taiwan should further relax these restrictions. This will not only benefit cross-strait economic cooperation, but also create more job opportunities for the people of Taiwan."

=== International reactions ===
- European Union: The European External Action Service stated that "Saturday’s first-ever meeting in Singapore […] is an encouraging step, demonstrating the level of trust that has been built through the ongoing process of rapprochement" and that "The EU looks forward to the continuation of the peaceful development of cross-Strait relations, to the benefit of the people on both sides of the Strait".
- Belgium: Former Prime Minister Mark Eyskens said: "The historic handshake between the leaders of the two sides of the Taiwan Strait and the development of cross-strait relations can serve as the best example for all parties to conflicts in the world." "No matter which party is in power next year, it would be foolish and shameful to decide to abandon the current peaceful status quo."
- Japan: The Japanese government said that "It is hoped that the two sides can resolve the issue peacefully through direct dialogue." The Yomiuri Shimbun reported on 8 November 2015 that Japan hoped the Ma–Xi meeting would help ease tensions in East Asia, but also took a cautious approach, fearing that the two sides would stand together on the Senkaku Islands dispute and historical issues related to Japan, such as visits to the Yasukuni Shrine and comfort women, and jointly resist Japan. The report quoted a Japanese official as saying that all parties were working together to stop Beijing, whether in the East China Sea or the South China Sea, but the situation may change now. A person close to Japanese Prime Minister Shinzo Abe said that Japan's real thoughts, anxiety and sense of crisis are very strong, and they are worried that Ma Ying-jeou may join Beijing in opposing Japan in order to boost Kuomintang's approval rating.
- Singapore: Prime Minister Lee Hsien Loong congratulated President Ma Ying-jeou on breaking through cross-strait relations. The Ministry of Foreign Affairs said that the meeting is a milestone in the history of cross-strait relations since 1949. As a close and longstanding friend of both mainland China and Taiwan, Singapore was happy to facilitate and be the venue for their direct dialogue.
- United Kingdom: Chris Patten, the Conservative politician who became the last governor of Hong Kong, said that the meeting was clearly set up to confer advantage to the Kuomintang in the forthcoming presidential elections. He however added that "peaceful reunification of the mainland and Taiwan remains unlikely, unless it takes place – as China continues to promise – on the basis of one country, two systems. But the Taiwanese cannot be very reassured by what they see happening today in Hong Kong, which was promised the same thing before its return to China in 1997."
- United States: The White House expressed cautious welcome to the meeting. The U.S. State Department also welcomed the meeting between the leaders of the two sides of the Taiwan Strait and the historic improvement in cross-strait relations over the past few years, which has benefited the United States and the entire region and encouraged the governments of both sides to continue constructive dialogue on the basis of mutual respect. State Department spokesperson Elizabeth Trudeau stated that the U.S. expected "constructive dialogue" to occur, though no statements were announced upon the conclusion of the meeting. Matt Salmon, chairman of the Subcommittee on Asia and the Pacific of the House Foreign Affairs Committee, said "Congratulations to President Ma for being equal and transparent at the Ma–Xi meeting, and affirm that President Ma is a very responsible leader." Douglas H. Paal, former director of the American Institute in Taiwan (AIT), said that "The Ma–Xi meeting is a model of the post-Cold War international order." Richard C. Bush, former director of the AIT, said "The Ma–Xi meeting itself is a major achievement." David Brown, a member of the AIT board, said "Ma Ying-jeou’s mention of the Republic of China and other facts has gradually increased the recognition of the Taipei government by the People’s Republic of China." Former National Security Council member Evan S. Medeiros credited the warming of relations that led to the meeting to U.S. President Barack Obama's "pivot to Asia."

== Aftermath ==
On 7 November 2025, Ma Ying-jeou posted on Facebook, calling on President Lai Ching-te to return to the political foundation shared by both sides of the Taiwan Strait ten years ago, and hoping that the newly elected Kuomintang chairperson Cheng Li-wun could restart the dialogue mechanism between the KMT and the CCP to promote stability in the Taiwan Strait. Cheng Li-wun expressed her gratitude to former President Ma Ying-jeou and General Secretary Xi Jinping for their determination, sense of responsibility and perseverance in the past, which brought about a macro-level pattern for the world, facilitated peace and stability across the Taiwan Strait during President Ma's eight years in office, and achieved the historic Ma–Xi meeting. She hoped that they would continue to uphold the same beliefs in the future and move forward bravely and firmly on this path of promoting peace.

== See also ==
- Second Ma–Xi meeting, in 2024
