= Lin Chu-chia =

Taiwanese politician

- 林祖嘉
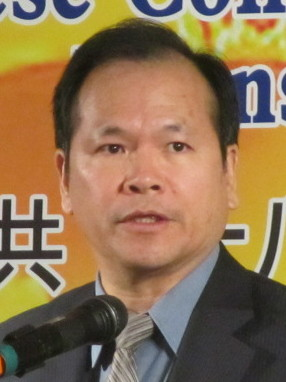

Minister of National Development Council of the Republic of China
- In office 1 February 2016 – 20 May 2016
- Preceded by: Woody Duh
- Succeeded by: Chen Tain-jy

Governor of Fujian Province
- In office 1 February 2016 – 20 May 2016
- Preceded by: Woody Duh
- Succeeded by: Chang Ching-sen

Special Deputy Minister of the Mainland Affairs Council of the Republic of China
- In office 16 August 2014 – 31 January 2016
- Minister: Wang Yu-chi; Andrew Hsia
- Preceded by: Chang Hsien-yao

Deputy Minister of the Mainland Affairs Council of the Republic of China
- In office 16 October 2012 – 16 August 2014
- Minister: Wang Yu-chi
- Succeeded by: Shih Hui-fen

Personal details
- Born: 1956 (age 69–70) Taoyuan, Taiwan
- Education: Tatung University (BA); National Chengchi University (MA); University of California, Los Angeles (PhD)

Lin Chu-chia (Chinese: 林祖嘉; pinyin: Lín Zǔjiā; born 1956), known also by his English name Steve Lin, is a Taiwanese economist and politician. He took junior positions at the Mainland Affairs Council before his 2016 promotion to concurrent posts as National Development Council head and Governor of Fujian Province.

== Early life and education ==
Lin was born in Taoyuan, Taiwan, in 1956. He graduated from Tatung University with a bachelor's degree in business administration and earned a master's degree in economics from National Chengchi University. He then completed doctoral studies in the United States, earning his Ph.D. in economics with a specialization in game theory from the University of California, Los Angeles, in 1988. His doctoral dissertation, completed under economist Bryan Ellickson, was titled, "Housing Demand and Residential Mobility: A Stochastic Process Model".

== ROC Mainland Affairs Council Deputy Ministry ==
Lin had been appointed the special deputy minister of the Mainland Affairs Council on 16 August 2012 was sworn in as deputy minister of the Mainland Affairs Council on 29 November 2012.

=== Cross-strait relations ===
Speaking at a seminar in Taipei about future of China in November 2012 after the 18th National Congress of the Chinese Communist Party (CCP), Lin said that the initiative for Beijing government to make reform determine the stability and harmony for cross-strait relations. Difference on the two sides should be dealt with mutual tolerance and understanding. Taipei government itself has the responsibility to share its 60-year experience of democratization and economic development with Beijing.

He further added that the MAC would conduct a thorough review on its Act Governing Relations between the People of the Taiwan Area and the Mainland Area and establish reciprocal representative office on each other's area to serve the needs of the people. The relations between the two sides is governed under ROC principle of 'one country, two areas' and also the mutual non-recognition of each other's sovereignty and mutual non-denial of each other's governing authority.

Regarding the possibility of CCP general secretary Xi Jinping and Taiwanese president Ma Ying-jeou meeting during the upcoming APEC China 2014, Lin said that the mainland China government is free to interpret such meeting as their domestic affairs.

=== Cross-strait service trade ===
In early July 2013 during a conference at the ROC Ministry of Foreign Affairs attended by foreign representatives and ambassadors, Lin said that the Cross-Strait Service Trade Agreement signed on 21 June 2013 in Shanghai was made in the interest of the interest of the Taiwanese people and that the MAC will continue the socialization with the Legislative Yuan, the public and Taiwanese doing business in mainland China to promote the pact's advantages. Lin was accompanied by Deputy Minister of Foreign Affairs Simon Ko, Straits Exchange Foundation Deputy Secretary-General Ma Shaw-chang and Vice Minister of Economic Affairs Cho Shih-chao.

Speaking at National Chengchi University in end of March 2014 after the Sunflower Student Movement, Lin said that Taiwan has signed closer economic cooperation with New Zealand and Singapore, and plan to do more with India and Indonesia at the end of the year. Only by engaging closer economic cooperation with mainland China, Taiwan can move forward towards Trans-Pacific Partnership.
