= 2014 Wang–Zhang meetings =

Sino–Taiwanese diplomacy

In 2014, a series of cross-strait meetings was held between Zhang Zhijun, director of the Chinese government's Taiwan Affairs Office, and Wang Yu-chi, director of Taiwan's Mainland Affairs Council.

The first meeting took place in Nanjing on 11 February 2014 when Wang visited mainland China, the first official contact between the two governments across the Taiwan Strait after the end of Chinese Civil War in 1949. The tour of Wang and his delegates lasted from 11 to 14 February in Nanjing and Shanghai.

On 25–28 June 2014, Zhang paid a retrospective visit to Taiwan in order to rebuild ties in the aftermath of the Sunflower Movement. It was the highest PRC government official visit to Taiwan. However, due to protests which turned violent, Zhang shortened his trip by cancelling three public appearances at the last minute.

== Background ==
In October 2013, in a hotel lobby on the sidelines of the APEC Indonesia 2013 meetings in the Indonesian island of Bali, Wang met with Zhang Zhijun, a ground breaking historical meeting for the first time between leader of Taiwan Affairs Office and leader of Mainland Affairs Council, where the two addressed each other by each's official title. Both of them called on the establishment of a regular dialogue mechanism between their two agencies to enhance mutual understanding and facilitate cross-strait engagement. Wang was also invited by Zhang to visit mainland China.

Prior to the first official meeting between Wang Yu-chi and Zhang Zhijun in Nanjing, Wang was not expected to sign any written agreement with China as requested by the Legislative Yuan earlier on 11 January.

On 12 June 2014, the MAC confirmed in a press conference of the four-day visit of Zhang Zhijun to Taiwan in end of June 2014. The TAO staff reportedly said that this trip would be conducted in the spirit of equality and dignity after Wang's visit to mainland China earlier on. It was reportedly that Zhang wishes to better understand the general perception of the Taiwanese people so that misunderstanding about mainland China can be reduced. Two days prior to Zhang's arrival in Taiwan, the MAC said that both sides would not discuss any highly sensitive political issues and would not sign any agreement or release any joint statement. The opposition Democratic Progressive Party demanded that the meeting to be conducted without any discussion about "one China", "one China framework" and "one country, two areas" concepts or military mutual trust mechanism and peace treaties issues.

== Wang Yu-chi's visit to mainland China ==
=== 11 February 2014 ===
==== Departure to Nanjing ====
Speaking at Taoyuan International Airport in Taiwan before departure to Nanjing with a delegation of 20 people, Wang said that he hoped that this trip would be smooth and help to promote mutual understanding between the two sides. Upon arrival at Nanjing Lukou International Airport in Nanjing, Wang and his delegates were welcomed by Chen Yuanfeng, deputy director of Taiwan Affairs Office.

==== Wang Yu-chi and Zhang Zhijun meeting ====
At the Purple Palace Nanjing (Chinese: 南京紫金山庄) before shaking hand, Wang referred Zhang as "TAO Director Zhang Zhijun" and Zhang referred Wang as "Minister Wang Yu-chi" without mentioning the name Mainland Affairs Council. However, mainland China's Xinhua News Agency referred Wang as the "Responsible Official of Taiwan's Mainland Affairs Council" (Chinese: 台湾方面大陆委员会负责人; pinyin: Táiwān Fāngmiàn Dàlù Wěiyuánhuì Fùzé Rén) in its Chinese-language news or as the "Taiwan's Mainland Affairs Chief" in its English-language news.

Upon meeting with Zhang which began at 2 p.m., both of them agreed on establishing a direct and regular communication channel between the two sides for future engagement under the 1992 Consensus. They also agreed on finding a solution for health insurance coverage aiming towards Taiwanese students studying in the mainland, on pragmatically establishing Straits Exchange Foundation and Association for Relations Across the Taiwan Straits offices in each other's territory and on studying the feasibility of allowing visits to detained person once offices have been established. Zhang said that the people on both sides across the Taiwan Strait belongs to one family, while Wang invited Zhang to visit Taiwan one day.

In the evening at 8:00 p.m., Wang and Zhang held a closed-door meeting which was not open to reporters. They also did not make any public statement prior to the meeting.

=== 12 February 2014 ===
==== Sun Yat-sen Mausoleum visit ====
Wang and delegates started the day by visiting the Sun Yat-sen Mausoleum and paid tribute to Sun Yat-sen. To climb the 392 steps leading to the tomb of Sun without a stop, equivalent to an 18-story building, Wang had earlier practiced on a treadmill during Chinese New Year. At 10:10 a.m., Wang and delegates reached the Festival Hall and bowed down three times to Sun statue. The 10:10 a.m. time was chosen to coincide with the Double Ten Day, the national day of the Republic of China which marked the starting date of Wuchang Uprising in Wuchang District, Hupeh Province.

After paying tribute, speaking at the Bo'ai Square of the mausoleum, Wang made a remark about his visit by mentioning the Three Principles of the People and Five-Power Constitution which are practiced in Taiwan. He also mentioned the name Republic of China in his speech which has already been in existence for 103 years. TAO officials deliberately avoided Wang during his speech.

==== Nanjing University speech ====
In the afternoon after his visit to Sun Yat-sen Mausoleum, speaking at Nanjing University to more than 200 students, Wang stressed the importance of youth exchanges in promoting the development of cross-strait relations. He called on people on both sides of the strait to keep carrying on Chinese traditional culture. He noted that there are still many differences between Taiwan and mainland China in terms of culture, society and education. He said however, as long as these differences can be treated pragmatically, more common ground and cooperation could be created. He also tactfully spoke about democracy.

=== 13 February 2014 ===
==== Shanghai think tank meeting ====
After arriving in Shanghai by Maglev from Shanghai Pudong International Airport, Wang and delegates joined a think tank on cross-strait relations with 14 scholars including the President of Shanghai Academy of Social Sciences. Wang was referred as the head of an agency of Taiwan area. Wang responded that generally in the meeting, both leaders of MAC and TAO were referred as Chairman. However, he could understand the dilemma faced by mainland Chinese people in addressing such issues and he had seen some progresses recently.

==== Shanghai Media Group and Shanghai Television visit ====
After the meeting, Wang continued his trip to visit Shanghai Media Group and Shanghai Television. At Shanghai Television, Wang urged the Government of China to lift bans against certain Taiwanese websites to allow Chinese people to see more shows, especially regarding Taiwanese films, TV programs and pop music. Responding to Wang's remark, the Taiwan Affairs Office said that they do not rule the Internet in mainland China, but rather "manage" it according with the existing law.

=== 14 February 2014 ===
==== Shanghai school for children of Taiwanese businessmen visit ====
Speaking in a forum at a school for children of Taiwanese businessmen in Shanghai, Wang said that his visit to Nanjing was aimed to build mutual understanding between both sides of the Taiwan Strait. He said that from his experience studying abroad, misunderstanding between people can be caused by cultural differences, such that accepting differences and respecting other is something easy to understand but difficult to put into practice.

=== Reactions ===
- Taiwan: President Ma Ying-jeou hailed the meeting to be extraordinary significant.
- United States: Department of State spokesperson Jen Psaki welcomed the meeting and the steps taken by both sides to reduce tension and improve relations.

== Zhang Zhijun's visit to Taiwan ==
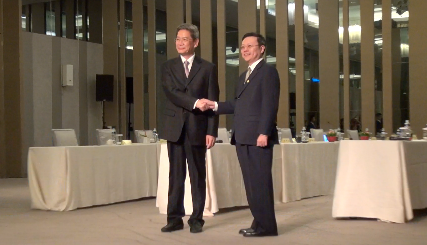
Wang-Zhang meeting in Taiwan

=== 25 June 2014 ===
==== Arrival at Taiwan ====
Upon arrival at Taiwan Taoyuan International Airport at Taoyuan County (now Taoyuan City) on an Air China flight, Zhang was welcomed by Chang Hsien-yao, Special Deputy Minister of Mainland Affairs Council. Zhang then greeted the public in Taiwanese Hokkien.

==== Zhang Zhijun and Wang Yu-chi meeting ====
Right after his arrival at the airport, Zhang met Wang at Novotel Taipei Taoyuan International Airport located nearby the airport. During the press conference following the meeting, the spokesperson of TAO conveyed a remark saying that both sides should be committed to develop and further consolidate the political foundation to continue cross-strait exchanges in various fields despite the recent twists and turns. On the MAC side, Wang made a remark saying that Zhang had responded positively to MAC proposal to reopen negotiations on certain controversial items in the Cross-Strait Service Trade Agreement signed last year provided that the agreement is first put into effect.

Some opposition parties made accusations towards the National Security Bureau for breaking into a room in the Novotel Hotel without a search warrant.

==== Meetings with academics ====
In the evening, Zhang held a closed-door meeting with mostly pro-reunification activists, including New Revolutionary Alliance (Chinese: 新同盟會) President Hsu Li-nong and Shih Hsin University Professor Wang Hsiao-po.

=== 26 June 2014 ===
==== New Taipei tour and New Taipei Mayor meeting ====
Zhang started the day by visiting a group of veterans, mainland Chinese spouses of Taiwanese nationals and residents in Xizhi District, New Taipei City. He then continued his trip to an adult daycare in Tucheng District to have lunch with the elderly.

In the afternoon, he met with New Taipei Mayor Eric Chu. Zhang expressed the hope for New Taipei City to continue deepen cooperation with mainland cities to create a win-win situation. Zhang added that he took New Taipei City as his first stop to learn about the construction of the city and learn the lives of the ordinary New Taipei citizens. Chu then accompanied Zhang to visit a public senior nursing center.

After the meeting, he visited Vigor Kobo Bakery in Wugu District famous for its pineapple cakes where he sat down with several small and medium enterprises (SME) leaders accompanied by MAC Special Deputy Minister Chang Hsien-yao and Economic Development Director Yeh Hui-ching to listen and hear suggestions and ideas on promoting cross-strait economic and trade exchanges to benefit SME. In the evening, he visited a Taiwanese aborigines community in Wulai District and promised that he would do more to promote aboriginal villages in Taiwan as tourist destinations for mainland Chinese tourists visiting Taiwan.

=== 27 June 2014 ===
==== Kaohsiung Mayor meeting ====
Zhang visited Kaohsiung by Taiwan High Speed Rail on Friday morning and met with Kaohsiung Mayor Chen Chu at Grand Hi-lai Hotel. While not mentioning the word "democracy" explicitly, Zhang made a statement saying that Chinese leaders know that Taiwanese people value their own system and that the mainland respects their choices of social system, values and way of life. Responding to Zhang's statement, Chen said that Zhang should regard all of the protests he encountered in Taiwan as "normal", as they are part of Taiwan's democratic system and that she appreciated Zhang's understanding of the situation. She also told Zhang about the anger of Taiwanese over the recent statement made by TAO spokesperson Fan Liqing that the future of Taiwan must be decided by all Chinese people, not only the Taiwanese.

==== I-Shou University Student meeting ====
At I-Shou University, Zhang, accompanied by officials from TAO and MAC, had a meeting with the chairperson of E United Group. The meeting was then followed by a gathering of 20 Taiwanese and mainland Chinese students from the university for 20 minutes followed by a lunch. Media was not allowed in the meeting. Zhang later remarked that he hopes Taiwanese students would have the opportunity to visit mainland China and see how the two sides are deeply rooted in common ancestry. He said that the mainland would like to share its economic achievements with Taiwan, rather than to swallow Taiwan's economy.

==== Fo Guang Shan visit ====
Zhang continued his trip to visit Fo Guang Shan, a famous Buddhist temple in Dashu District. Practitioners lined up from the entrance and waved flags to welcome him. The visit to this venue was the only visit in which Zhang did not encounter protesters.

==== Wang Yu-chi casual meeting ====
When Zhang arrived at a casual meeting with Wang Yu-chi at Sizihwan Sunset Beach Resort in Xiziwan, Gushan District in the evening around 8:10 pm, protesters organized by Taiwan Solidarity Union and Black Island National Youth Front greeted the motorcade by spraying white paint and throwing ghost money, shouting slogans such as "One Country on Each Side" and "Zhang Zhijun get out of here". The white paint did not hit Zhang but instead his body guards. There were at least 400 policemen and 66 special officers deployed to the site at that time.

After Zhang had entered the building safely to meet Wang, MAC Deputy Minister Chang Hsien-yao appeared outside the venue in apparent anger. He criticized the council staff and demanded to speak with the police officer in charge in the insufficiency of police personnel at the site. Chang then started to order the police and SWAT to be standby the door.

Zhang responded to the protest by saying such protest was normal and saying that Taiwanese society is plural with many diversity views, and that he believed that both sides of the Taiwan Strait should adhere to the path of peaceful development in cross-trait relations. Wang then told Zhang that people protesting to make their voice heard is part of the Taiwanese life, and that since he is the head of TAO, he must get used to it and understand Taiwan more, because the ROC government has been experiencing such protests everyday in life.

=== 28 June 2014 ===
==== Hui-ming Elementary School for the Blind visit and Taichung Mayor meeting ====
In his last day trip to Taiwan, Zhang visited the Hui-ming Elementary School for the Blind in Taichung at noon where he had a chat with Taichung Mayor Jason Hu. Zhang also delivered a short speech at the school saying that he had made a wish during his visit to Fo Guang Shan at Kaohsiung hoping that both sides of the Taiwan Strait can resolve long-term issues gradually with wisdom and familial affection and jointly make contribution to revive the Chinese nation.

== See also ==
- Cross-Strait relations
- 2005 Pan-Blue visits to mainland China
- 2015 Ma–Xi meeting
