= Chang Hsien-yao =

Taiwanese political scientist and politician

- 張顯耀
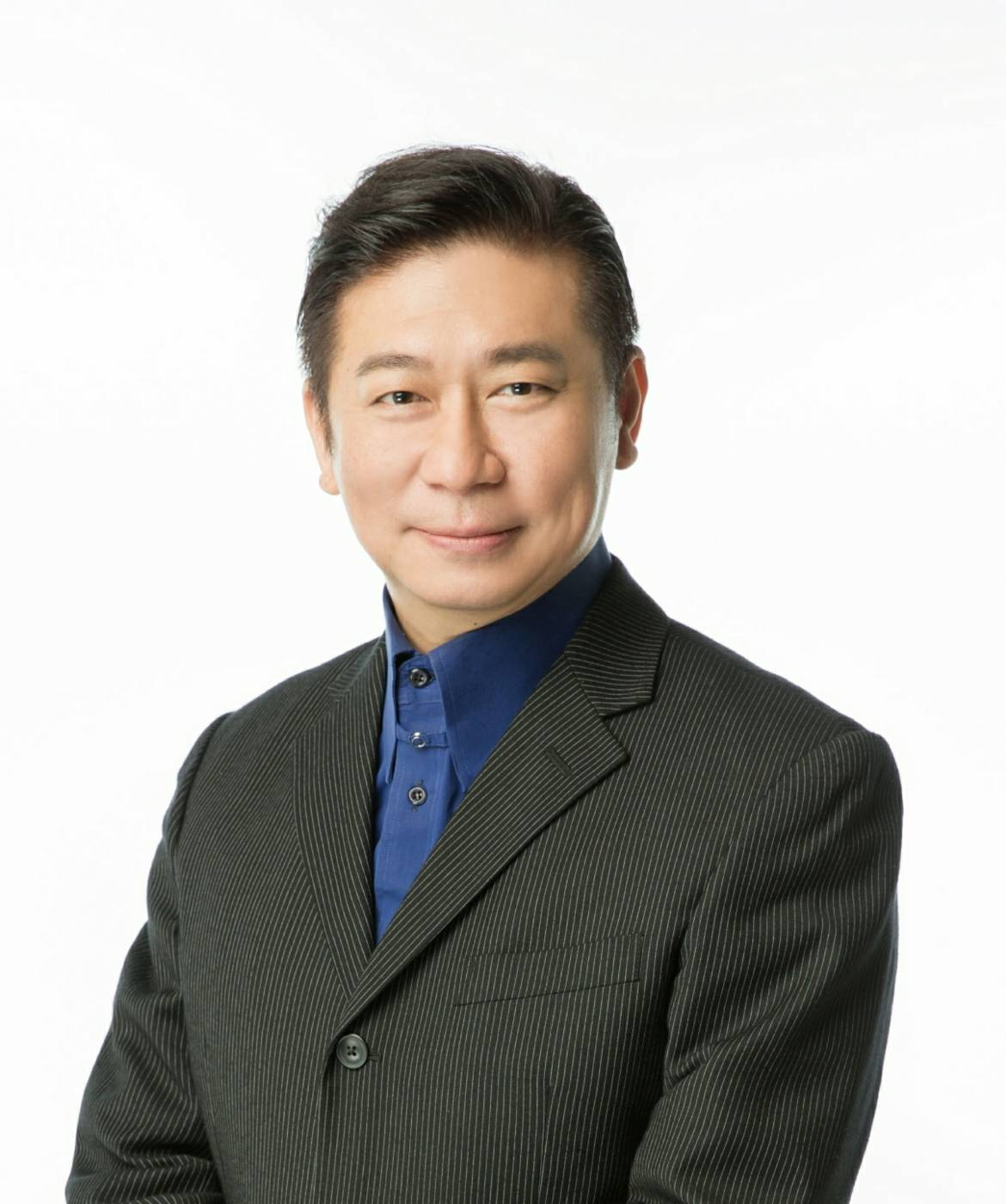
- Official portrait, 2023

Vice Chairman and Secretary-General of the Straits Exchange Foundation
- In office 7 February 2014 – 16 August 2014
- Chairman: Lin Join-sane
- Deputy: Ma Shaw-chang
- Preceded by: Kao Koong-lian
- Succeeded by: Shih Hui-fen

Special Deputy Minister of the Mainland Affairs Council of the Republic of China
- In office 2 September 2013 – 16 August 2014
- Minister: Wang Yu-chi
- Succeeded by: Lin Chu-chia

Political Deputy Minister of the Mainland Affairs Council
- In office February 2012 – 2 September 2013
- Minister: Wang Yu-chi
- Succeeded by: Wu Mei-hung

Member of the Legislative Yuan
- In office 1 February 2008 – 31 January 2012
- Constituency: National at-large
- In office 1 February 2005 – 31 January 2008
- Constituency: Kaohsiung 1

Personal details
- Born: 6 November 1963 (age 63)
- Party: Kuomintang
- Education: Central Police University (BA); Tamkang University (MA); Panthéon-Sorbonne University (PhD)
- Scientific career
- Fields: Political science
- Thesis: La question de Tai͏̈wan, un dangereux jeu d'équilibre: étude du problème de sécurité dans la région Asie Pacifique (1998)
- Doctoral advisor: Charles Zorgbibe

Chang Hsien-yao or Vincent Chang (Chinese: 張顯耀; pinyin: Zhāng Xiǎnyào; Wade–Giles: Chang¹ Hsien³-yao⁴; born 6 November 1963) is a Taiwanese political scientist and politician. He was the Special Deputy Minister of the Mainland Affairs Council of the Executive Yuan in September 2013 until August 2014 and concurrently as the Vice Chairman and Secretary-General of the Straits Exchange Foundation (SEF) in February 2014 until August 2014.

== Early life and education ==
Chang was born on November 6, 1963, in Nantou County, Taiwan. He graduated from Central Police University with a bachelor's degree in public security, as a member of the college's 50th class. He then earned a master's degree in European studies from Tamkang University in 1993. His master's thesis was titled, "A study of the direction of the European Union's 'Common Foreign and Security Policy'".

Chang won the Kuomintang's Sun Yat-sen Scholarship to pursue doctoral studies in France, where he earned his Ph.D. in political science from Paris 1 Panthéon-Sorbonne University in 1998 under French political historian Charles Zorgbibe. His doctoral dissertation was titled, "La question de Tai͏̈wan, un dangereux jeu d'équilibre: étude du problème de sécurité dans la région Asie Pacifique".

== Early career ==
Upon graduation, he returned to Taiwan and worked at the National Security Council. Chang had been teaching at Taiwanese universities as an assistant professor at Nanhua University, Central Police University, and Chinese Culture University.

== Political career ==
In 2000, he joined People First Party (PFP) and ever since had been working closely with the party chairman, James Soong, serving as the director of the policy center of PFP.

In 2005, he arranged the meeting between Soong with then-General Secretary of the Chinese Communist Party Hu Jintao after communicating with the then-Director of Taiwan Affairs Office Chen Yunlin.

Before joining Mainland Affairs Council in 2012, Chang served for the National Security Council.

== ROC Mainland Affairs Council Political Deputy Ministry ==
=== Cross-strait reciprocal representative offices ===
In mid April 2013, Chang said that the ROC government is making the preparation for both sides across the Taiwan Strait to establish representative offices on each side by the end of 2013 after a draft bill was approved at the ROC cabinet meeting. Branch office of Association for Relations Across the Taiwan Straits (ARATS) will be established in Taiwan, while branch office of Straits Exchange Foundation (SEF) will be established in Mainland China, although no timetable has been set for the establishment.

ARATS officers in Taiwan later will enjoy some certain degree of special rights which would not fall under ROC jurisdiction and granted some privileges in the discretion of ROC Cabinet. The bill is the base in which both sides sustain an equal and reciprocal relationship, Chang added. However, he also emphasized that ARATS branch office in Taiwan will never be the same like PRC Liaison Office in Hong Kong because Taiwan-Mainland China relations is completely different than Hong Kong-Mainland China relations.

=== Cross-strait service trade ===
In end of June 2013, Chang joined a delegation led by Lin Join-sane, Chairman of Straits Exchange Foundation (SEF), to visit Shanghai from Taiwan for the Cross-Strait Service Trade Agreement signing. The Taiwanese delegation includes Cho Shih-chao, Vice Minister of Economic Affairs and Kao Koong-lian, Vice Chairman and Secretary-General of Straits Exchange Foundation.

The cross-strait service trade agreement was signed on 21 June 2013 which consists of four chapters and twenty four articles. Under the agreement, 64 Taiwanese industries will be opened to mainland Chinese investments, ranging from transportation, tourism and traditional Chinese medicine sectors. Meanwhile, 80 mainland Chinese industries will be opened to Taiwanese investments, ranging from finance, retail, electronics, publishing and travel sectors. Chang said that the signing of the trade will make Taiwan and Mainland China the most stable market in the world and serves as a path for Taiwan towards the membership of the Trans-Pacific Partnership and Regional Comprehensive Economic Partnership. Investment from Mainland China will also help Taiwan become more competitive.

== SEF Vice Chairmanship and Secretary-General ==
In early February 2014, Chang was appointed to be the vice chairman and secretary-general of the Straits Exchange Foundation (SEF), replacing Kao Koong-lian who had earlier on tendered his resignation. Chang's appointed also made the promotion of SEF Maa Shaw-chang from Deputy Secretary-General to become Deputy Chairman to help Chang share the workload.

Chang's first task after assuming SEF post is to prepare for the upcoming 10th Cross-Strait Economic, Trade and Culture Forum.

== Resignation and spy allegation ==
On 16 August 2014, tendered his resignation from both MAC and SEF, citing family reasons as the reason. Lin Chu-chia, MAC Deputy Minister, was immediately appointed to replace Chang.

Few days later on 21 August 2014, Chang held a press conference in Taipei responding to an allegation he received from the government that he had leaked national secrets to Mainland China thus that he was actually sacked from the MAC by Minister Wang Yu-chi. During the press conference, Chang said that he called on President Ma Ying-jeou to take care for himself because Ma had been 'hijacked' by a handful of people and deceived into believing allegations against him were fabricated by those people.

The Investigation Bureau of the Ministry of Justice even suspected that Chang had been recruited as a spy for the Chinese Communist Party. Legislators from the Democratic Progressive Party and People First Party responded by lashing out at the government for making such accusations towards Chang, and even asked that the cross-strait negotiations be temporarily halted.

Chang was then being investigated by the Taipei District Prosecutor's Office for breaching the National Security Information Protection Act (Chinese: 國家安全機密保護法) for disclosing five confidential and secret pieces of information on cross-strait economics, trade and trade service agreements on at least two separate occasions. He was then barred from leaving Taiwan.

On 25 August 2014, he appeared at the Taipei District Prosecutor's Office trying to clear his name from the spying allegation. After the interrogation, Chang was put into house arrest and listed as a defendant. On 28 August, the Investigation Bureau approved a search warrant for Chang's residence and six other locations. In a different occasion, President Ma Ying-jeou threw his approval behind MAC Minister Wang Yu-chi's decision to sack Chang.

On 10 February 2015 the Investigation Bureau dropped the charges against him, and Wang Yu-chi immediately announced his resignation from his post as MAC minister, stating that he disagreed with the decision but would respect it and take responsibility.

== Later political career ==
Chang announced that his bid to contest the Kuomintang nomination for the Taipei mayoralty in February 2018.

Days before the 2024 Taiwanese general election, Chang was questioned by the Ciaotou District Prosecutors Office about suspected violations of the Anti-Infiltration Act and the Presidential and Vice Presidential Election and Recall Act, and later released on bail. Chang was formally charged with violating the Anti-Infiltration Act in February 2025.
