= Shih Hui-fen =

Taiwanese politician

- 施惠芬

Deputy Minister of Mainland Affairs Council of the Republic of China
- In office 16 August 2014 – 20 May 2016
- Minister: Wang Yu-chi; Andrew Hsia
- Preceded by: Lin Chu-chia

Personal details
- Education: National Taiwan University (LLB, MS)

Shih Hui-fen (Chinese: 施惠芬; pinyin: Shī Huìfēn) is a Taiwanese politician. She was the Deputy Minister of Mainland Affairs Council from 2014 to 2016.

== Education ==
Shih received her bachelor's degree in law from National Taiwan University and her master's degree in social science from the same university.
