= Andrew Hsia =

Taiwanese lawyer and diplomat

Hsia Li-yan
- 夏立言
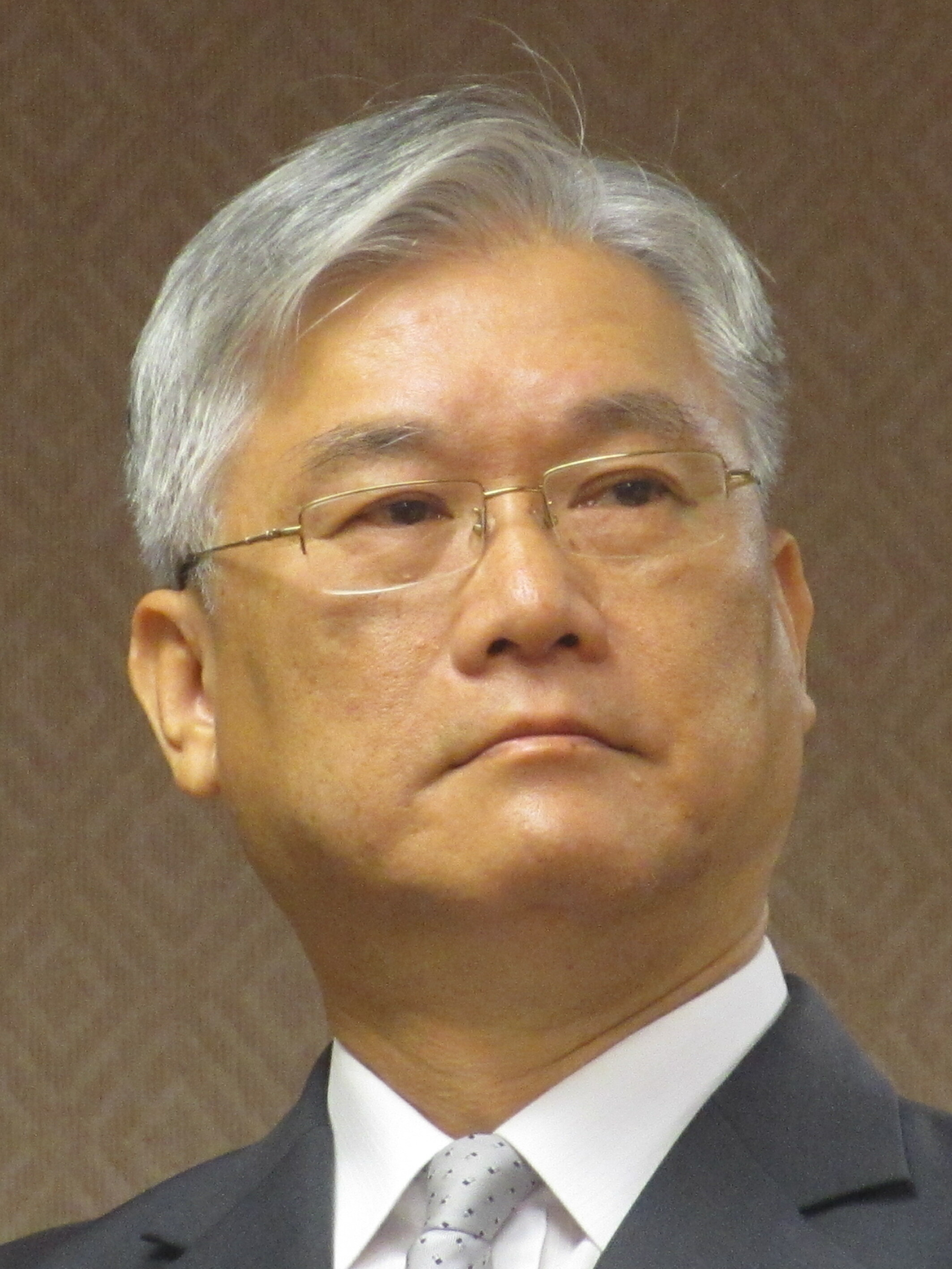

Vice Chairman of the Kuomintang
- Incumbent
- Assumed office 30 October 2021 Serving with Huang Min-hui, Sean Lien
- Chairperson: Eric Chu
- Preceded by: Hau Lung-pin, Tseng Yung-chuan

Minister of the Mainland Affairs Council
- In office 16 February 2015 – 20 May 2016
- Deputy: Lin Chu-chia, Shih Hui-fen, Wu Mei-hung; Lin Chu-chia, Shih Hui-fen
- Preceded by: Wang Yu-chi
- Succeeded by: Katharine Chang

Deputy Minister of National Defense of the Republic of China
- In office 22 October 2013 – February 2015
- Minister: Yen Ming
- Preceded by: Andrew Yang
- Succeeded by: Chen Yeong-kang

Taiwanese Representative to Indonesia
- In office December 2009 – 22 October 2013
- Preceded by: Timothy Yang
- Succeeded by: Chang Liang-jen

Deputy Minister of Foreign Affairs
- In office 20 May 2008 – 16 September 2009
- Minister: Francisco Ou
- Succeeded by: Shen Lyu-hsun

Taiwanese Representative to India
- In office June 2007 – 2008

Taiwanese Representative to the United States
- In office 2001 – June 2007
- Succeeded by: Kenneth Liao

Taiwanese Deputy Representative to Canada
- In office 1996–1998

Personal details
- Born: 24 December 1950 (age 75) Taipei, Taiwan
- Education: Fu Jen Catholic University (LLB); National Chengchi University (MA); University of Oxford (MLitt); University College London (LLM)

Hsia Li-yan (Chinese: 夏立言; pinyin: Xià Lìyán; born 24 December 1950), also known by his English name Andrew Hsia, is a Taiwanese lawyer and diplomat who is a vice chairman of the Kuomintang. He was minister of the Mainland Affairs Council from February 2015 to May 2016, and was chairman of the Association of Foreign Relations (AFR) from 2017 to 2022. Since 2023, he continues to serve on the AFR Board as managing supervisor.

== Education ==
Hsia graduated from Fu Jen Catholic University with a Bachelor of Laws (LL.B.) in 1972 and received a Master of Arts (M.A.) in diplomacy from National Chengchi University in 1976. Hsia then pursued graduate studies in England at the University of Oxford, where he earned a Master of Letters (M.Litt.) at the Faculty of Law in international law as a member of New College, Oxford, in 1981. His M.Litt. dissertation, completed under distinguished professors D. P. O'Connell and M. H. Mendelson, was titled, "Some jurisdictional problems arising from ship-source marine pollution: with special reference to port state jurisdiction." He also graduated from University College London with a Master of Laws (LL.M.) in 1981.

After completing his LL.M. degree, Hsia was a visiting scholar at the Queen Mary University of London from 1985 to 1988.

== Diplomatic career ==
=== Representative to the United States ===
In mid of August 2005, Hsia protested to the United Nations (UN) for naming the People's Republic of China (PRC) as one of the founding member of the UN that signed the United Nations Charter during an exhibition commemorating 60th anniversary of the UN, instead of the Republic of China (ROC). He stressed that in 1945, it was the ROC who was China, since the PRC was only founded in 1949.

=== Representative to India ===
After being appointed ROC representative to India in June 2007, Hsia said that he hoped to work on securing India's support for Taiwan's membership in the World Health Organization of the United Nations. He also would focus on trade, tourism and technological exchanges between the two.

=== Deputy Minister of Foreign Affairs ===
Hsia resigned from his post in August 2009 after a cable was disclosed by a newspaper stating that the Ministry of Foreign Affairs had instructed all of the ROC representative offices around the world to decline all forms of foreign aid in the aftermath of Typhoon Morakot.

=== Representative to Indonesia ===
During his term as the ROC representative to Indonesia, Hsia actively promoted bilateral exchanges between Taiwan and Indonesia in the field of trade, culture and education. He was involved in the joint development of Morotai Island of North Maluku province and an industrial park in Jakarta.

==== 2013 Jakarta International Defense Dialogue ====
Commenting on the barring of the Taiwanese delegation to attend the 3rd Jakarta International Defense Dialogue (JIDD) in Jakarta in March 2013, Hsia said that he was not pleased with the incident since this conference is about regional security and Taiwan is certainly one of the major player. The Taipei Economic and Trade Office in Jakarta demanded an explanation from the Government of Indonesia regarding the incident.

Indonesia, represented by the JIDD organizing committee chairperson, responded by saying that the Ministry of Defense of Indonesia had received a verbal complaint from the Chinese Embassy asking them to discourage the Taiwanese delegates from attending the conference.

== Military career ==
On 22 October 2013, Premier Jiang Yi-huah named Hsia to fill in the position of Deputy Minister of the National Defense, in which Hsia will be tasked to oversee arms procurement policies.

The position had been vacated for more than 2 months since 1 August 2013 when then-Deputy Minister of National Defense Andrew Yang was promoted to the Minister position after the resignation of then-Minister of National Defense Kao Hua-chu due to the death scandal of army corporal Hung Chung-chiu.

Jiang said that the decision to choose him for this position was made after consultation with President Ma Ying-jeou, Ministry of Foreign Affairs and Ministry of National Defense.

== Political career ==
=== Mainland Affairs Council Minister ===
On 16 February 2015, he was appointed as the minister of the Mainland Affairs Council.

=== Vice Chairman of the Kuomintang ===
As vice chair of the KMT, Hsia visited the People's Republic of China in February and met with Song Tao, director of the Taiwan Affairs Office, and Wang Huning, fourth-ranking member of the Politburo Standing Committee of the Chinese Communist Party. During the visit, Wang said that "Taiwan independence is incompatible with peace and runs counter to the well-being of Taiwan compatriots".

In December 2023, Hsia led a KMT delegation to mainland China as a "mission to maintain contacts." The trip came under scrutiny in the run-up to the 2024 elections.

Hsia visited mainland China again in March 2024 to meet Taiwanese business communities. His trip included visits to Chongqing, Chengdu, Jinan, and Qingdao. During the trip he reportedly said that he would "supervise" the Democratic Progressive Party in handling a recent speedboat incident.
