= Cross-Strait Service Trade Agreement =

2013 unratified treaty between mainland China and Taiwan

CSSTA
Cross-Strait Service Trade Agreement
- Type: Service Trade Agreement
- Signed: June 21, 2013; 12 years ago
- Location: Dong Jiao State Guest Hotel, Shanghai, China
- Ratified: Unratified
- Signatories: Chairman Lin Join-sane President Chen Deming
- Parties: Straits Exchange Foundation (China) Association for Relations Across the Taiwan Straits
- Language: Standard Chinese

Full text
- zh:海峽兩岸服務貿易協議 at Wikisource

Cross-Strait Service Trade Agreement
- Traditional Chinese: 海峽兩岸服務貿易協議
- Simplified Chinese: 海峡两岸服务贸易协议
Transcriptions
Standard Mandarin
- Hanyu Pinyin: Hǎixiá Liǎng'àn Fúwù Màoyì Xiéyì
- Wade–Giles: Hai-hsia Liang-an Fuwu Mao-i Hsieh-i
Yue: Cantonese
- Jyutping: Hoihaap Loengngon Fukmou Maujik Hipji
Southern Min
- Hokkien POJ: Hái-kiap lióng-gān ho̍k-bū mō͘-e̍k hia̍p-gī

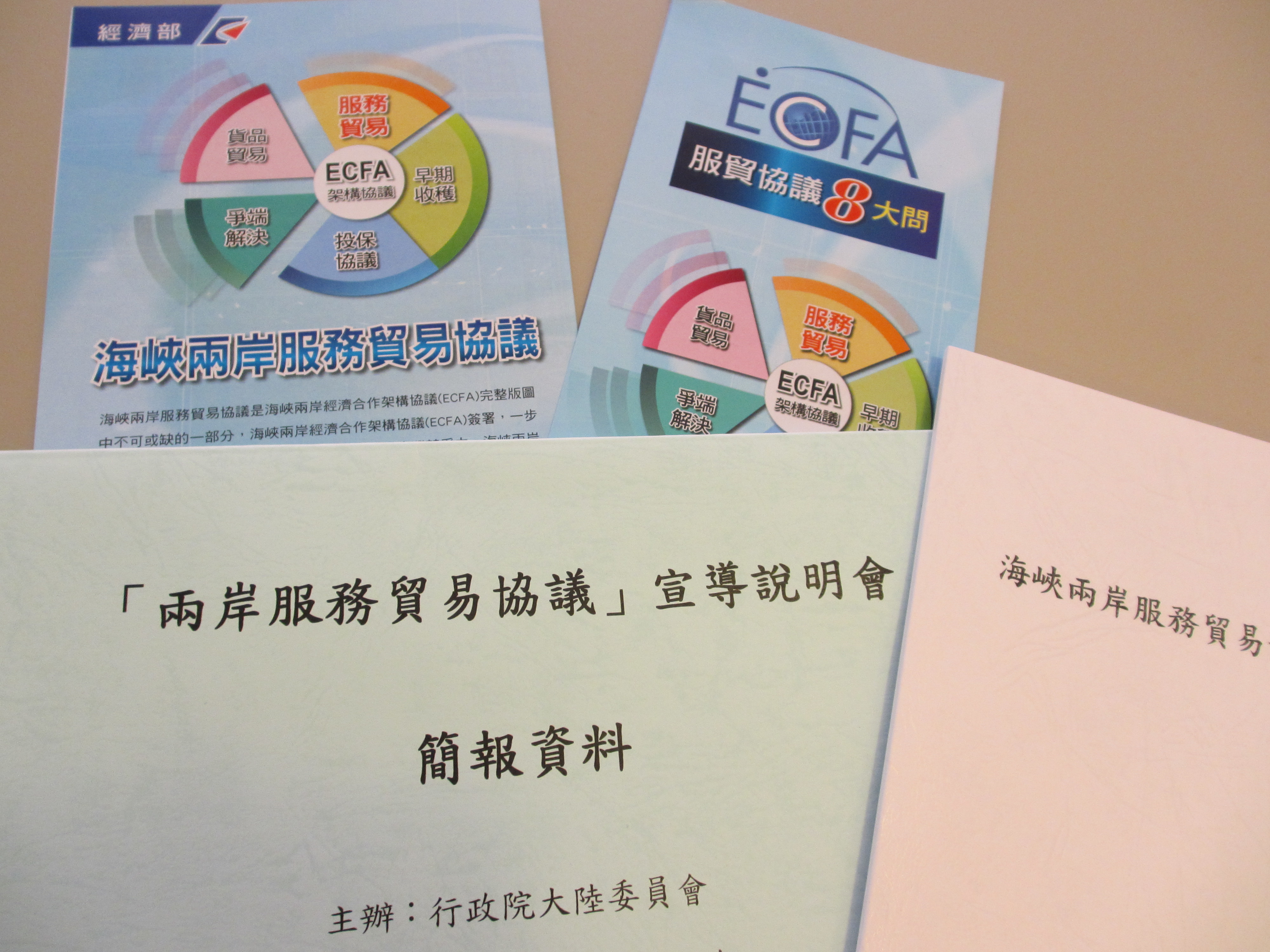
The Advertisement printed by Ministry of Economic Affairs (Taiwan) and Mainland Affairs Council.

The Cross-Strait Service Trade Agreement, commonly abbreviated CSSTA and sometimes alternatively translated Cross-Strait Agreement on Trade in Services, is a treaty between the People's Republic of China and the Republic of China (Taiwan) that was signed in June 2013. However, it was never ratified by the Taiwanese legislature due to opposition from the Sunflower Student Movement, which rejected the CSSTA on the grounds that the Kuomintang (KMT) leadership in Taiwan negotiated and attempted ratification of the treaty in an undemocratic way.

The treaty aimed to liberalize trade between the two economies in service industries such as banking, healthcare, tourism, film, telecommunications, and publishing. The CSSTA was one of two planned follow-up treaties to the 2010 Economic Cooperation Framework Agreement. The other, the Cross-Strait Goods Trade Agreement, had not yet been negotiated.

== Diplomatic and legislative history ==
The CSSTA was negotiated and signed by the Straits Exchange Foundation, representing Taiwan, and the Association for Relations Across the Taiwan Straits, representing mainland China, on June 21, 2013, in Shanghai. The leadership of the KMT had hoped to immediately send the treaty to the legislature to be ratified, but substantial concern about the closed-door negotiations and the potential effects of the treaty among opposition lawmakers, academics, civic organizations, and ordinary citizens compelled the KMT leadership to agree on June 25, 2013, to a clause-by-clause review of the treaty and a series of public hearings on its possible effects.

On March 17, 2014, after a continuing standstill in the legislature over the review process, KMT leadership asserted that the review process had exceeded the allotted time and was to be considered complete, and the CSSTA would therefore be submitted to a final vote on March 21. The legality of this action is debated by experts. Public protest in response began that night, expressing disapproval of the purportedly antidemocratic behavior of the KMT as well as long-simmering discontent with the CSSTA. The protests quickly developed into the Sunflower Student Movement.

In June 2023, the 2024 presidential candidate for the Taiwan People's Party, Ko Wen-je, called for restarting negotiations on the CSSTA. His remarks drew criticism from Vice Premier Cheng Wen-tsan, DPP candidate in the 2024 election and then-Vice President Lai Ching-te, and other members of the Pan-Green Coalition. Ko distanced himself from his comments and maintained ambiguity on his viewpoint towards reviving the CSSTA, stating that supervisory regulations should first be passed. After Ko's initial remarks, KMT candidate Hou Yu-ih suggested Ko was partly to blame for the 2014 failure to pass and reiterated his support for the CSSTA.

== Content ==
The text of the CSSTA, including its two appendices ("Schedules of Specific Commitments on Trade in Services" and "Specific Provisions of Service Suppliers"), is in total approximately 50 pages long.

The main text enumerates rules regarding transparency requirements, administration of regulatory measures, prevention of unfair competition, an emergency negotiation mechanism, free movement of payments and capital transfers, and a principle of fair and equitable treatment.

The first appendix, "Schedules of Specific Commitments on Trade in Services," lists service sectors or sub-sectors and related commitments on market liberalization of the two parties. The schedule is a "positive list," meaning that service sectors or subsectors not explicitly listed in the schedule are not subject to increased opening. Up to 64 Taiwanese industries and up to 80 Chinese industries will be opened. Affected industries include business services, communication services, construction and related engineering services, distribution services, environmental services, health-related and social services, tourism and travel-related services, recreational, cultural, and sporting services, transport services, and financial services. The two parties made commitments on eliminating or reducing limitations on equity participation, expanding business scope in terms of geography or lines of business, and undertaking trade facilitation measures.

Considering the controversial issue of labor movement, both sides agreed to apply the "Annex on Movement of Natural Persons Supplying Services" under the GATS to this agreement, meaning that this agreement will not apply to any governmental measures affecting natural persons seeking access to the employment market of either Party, nor will it apply to measures regarding citizenship, residence or employment on a permanent basis. However, qualified executives from China and relatives thereof may seek 3-year visas in Taiwan, and no limit is placed on the number of times the 3-year visas may be renewed.

The CSSTA includes an article to mandate future negotiations of market access on the basis of consensus. It also provides for a communication mechanism between both sides to monitor implementation.

== Opposition ==
The CSSTA has been a subject of intense controversy in Taiwan. Advocates of the treaty argue that increased Chinese investment would provide a necessary boost to Taiwan's economy, that the still-unspecified details of the treaty's implementation can be worked out favorably for Taiwan, and that to "pull out" of the treaty by not ratifying it would damage Taiwan's international credibility. The treaty's opponents argue that the treaty would benefit large companies while devastating small and medium-sized Taiwanese businesses, that Chinese investment in the publishing industry, coming on top of currently substantial Chinese investment in the news media, would imperil free speech in Taiwan, and that the treaty would in effect lay the groundwork for eventual political unification with mainland China.

More than 200 professors and industry experts have issued joint statements and held panel discussions warning the national security risks in the liberalization of the type II telecommunication services outlined in the trade pact.

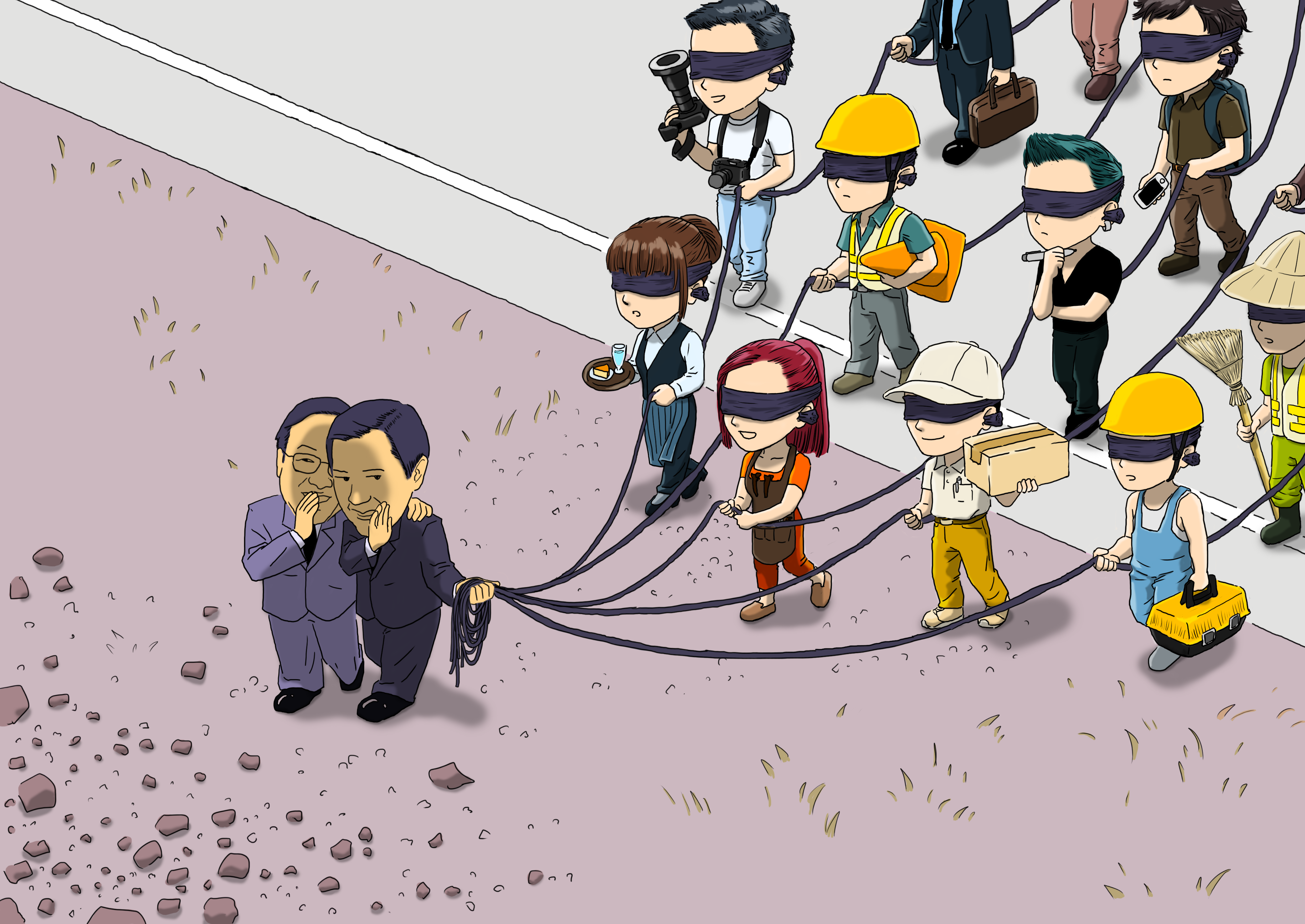
Activists representation of the Cross-Strait Service Trade Agreement's deal opacity.

The chair of Economy Department in Taiwan University, Professor Zen Xiuling, pointed out that the Cross-Strait Service Trade Agreement opened 64 sectors in Taiwanese market. These 64 sectors in fact encompass thousands of businesses in Taiwan, including transportation, telecommunication, and all kinds of whole-sale/retail business that are intrinsically related to national security and the sustainability of small-to-medium businesses. Governmental officials in charge of the negotiation with China prioritize the privileged financial groups at the expense of national welfare. Opening Taiwan to China without reservation will render the island's infrastructures—both in commodity and capital circulation—to Chinese control. Sending Taiwanese specialists to China, "our economy will soon be controlled completely by China." Taking example from the 5-year FTA negotiation between the US and South Korea, Zen Xiuling suggested, "the Cross-Strait Service Trade Agreement can be modified, and we demand the Legislative Yuan [parliament] to re-negotiate with China." At the public hearing for the CSSTA on July 31, 2013, Zen Xiuling reasserted her point: the Cross-Strait Service Trade Agreement opens Taiwan's telecommunication industry, whole-sale/retail businesses, and printing/publication industry to China, threatening the national security, economy, and freedom of speech in Taiwan. She therefore urged the government to renegotiate with China based on the example of the US-South Korea FTA negotiation.

Responding to the questions, Mainland Affairs Council Minister Wang Yu-chi said that the classified information was to be used for reference only within the government. Deputy Minister of Economic Affairs Cho Shih-chao said that research produced by academics is only used for internal reference for decisionmaking. However, neither official explained why only poll numbers favorable to the government's position have been released to the public, while others were not.

== Public opinion ==
A March 2014 survey by the Taiwanese magazine Business Week indicated that 56.3% of Taiwanese opposed the treaty and 22.3% supported it. However 80.9% of those polled claimed to lack sufficient knowledge about the agreement. A poll sanctioned by the Mainland Affairs Council and run by National Chengchi University in May 2014 showed a closer split in opinion, with 42.5% supporting the service agreement, and 40.1% opposing it. A majority of the people polled supported immediate deliberation and clause-by-clause review of the CSSTA, along with more transparency in the negotiation process and improved communication within the government about pacts with China, and future review of all cross-strait pacts by the Executive Yuan and National Security Council. A bill intended to provide oversight on accords with China was proposed in April 2015, but did not make it to committee.

=== Sunflower Student Movement ===
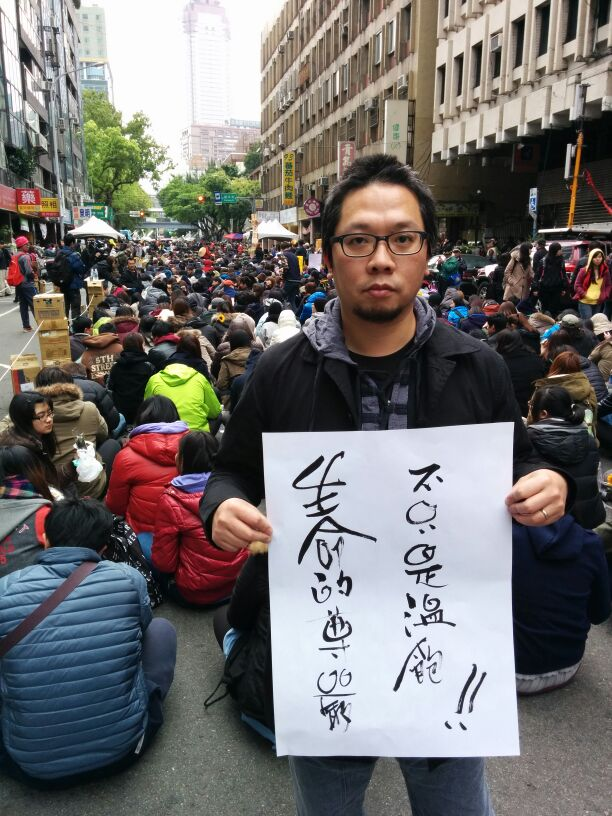
Protesters outside the Legislative Yuan

On March 18, 2014, protesters occupied the Legislative Yuan to raise their concern about the trade accord, which they argued was forced to the legislative floor without proper due process. The protest, peaking at more than 500,000 people, is the largest student-led protest in Taiwan's history. Thousands of riot police from the National Police Agency were mobilized during the protests.
