= Wang Yu-chi =

Taiwanese lawyer and legal scholar (born 1969)

- 王鬱琦
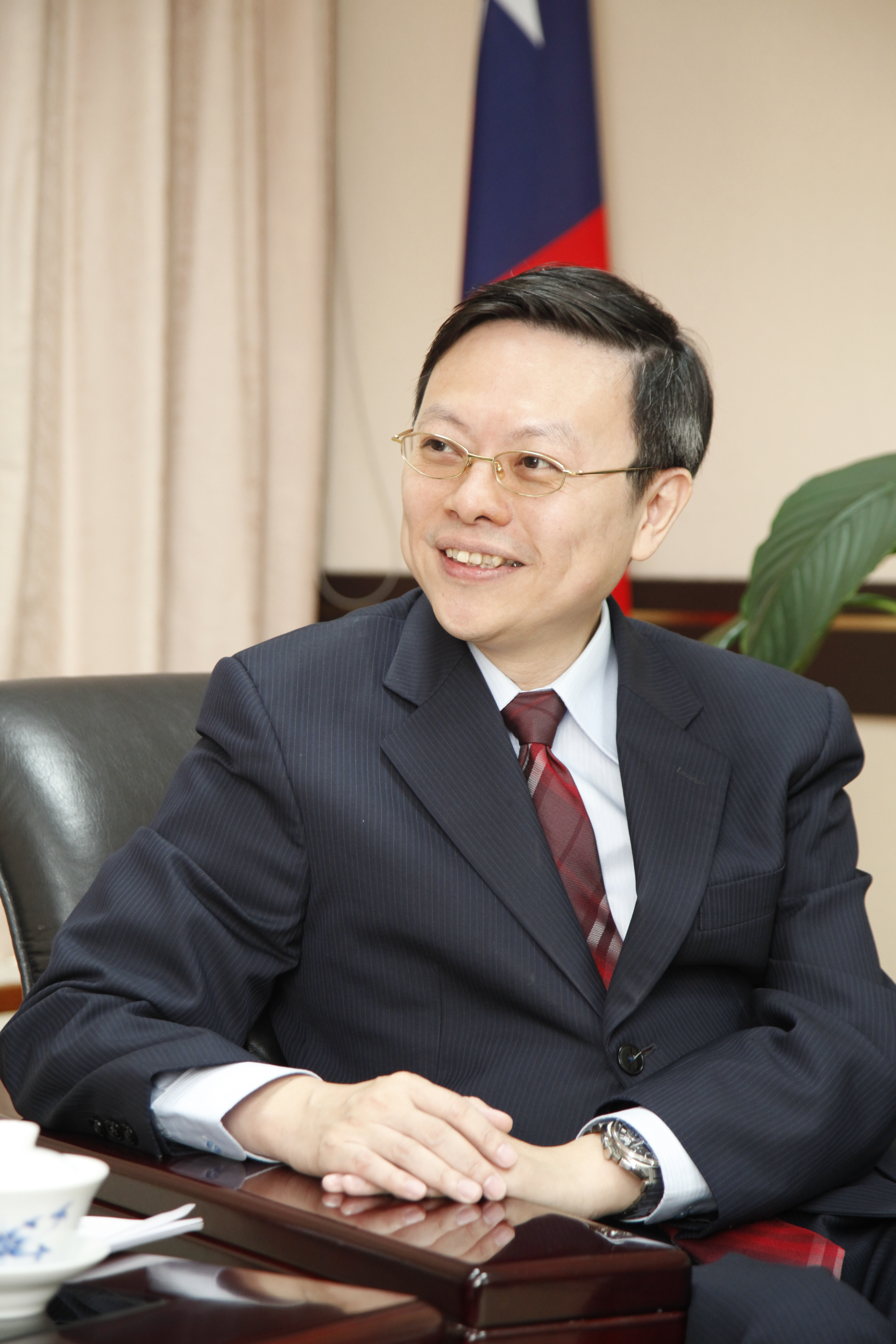
- Wang in 2013

Minister of the Mainland Affairs Council of the Executive Yuan
- In office 28 September 2012 – 16 February 2015
- Preceded by: Lai Shin-yuan
- Succeeded by: Andrew Hsia

Personal details
- Born: 1969 (age 56–57) Taipei, Taiwan
- Party: Kuomintang
- Education: National Taiwan University (LLB); Indiana University Bloomington (LLM, SJD)

Chinese name
- Traditional Chinese: 王鬱琦
- Simplified Chinese: 王郁琦
Transcriptions
Standard Mandarin
- Hanyu Pinyin: Wáng Yùqí
- Wade–Giles: Wang2 Yü4-chʻi2

Wang Yu-chi (Chinese: 王鬱琦; born 1969) is a Taiwanese lawyer and legal scholar. He served as the minister of the Mainland Affairs Council (MAC) of the Executive Yuan from 2012 to 2015. He was the first ROC ministerial-level government official to visit mainland China since the end of the Chinese Civil War in 1949.

== Early life and education ==
Wang was born in Taipei in 1969. After graduating from Taipei Municipal Chien Kuo High School, he attended law school at National Taiwan University (NTU), earning a Bachelor of Laws (LL.B.) in 1991. As a third-year student at NTU, he won a debate competition in Singapore hosted by the Singapore Broadcasting Corporation. After graduation, he earned a Master of Laws (LL.M.) in 1993 and a Doctor of Juridical Science (S.J.D.) in 1997 from the Indiana University School of Law, where he studied under Alfred C. Aman Jr. and was the first in the school's history to earn an S.J.D. degree.

== Academic career ==
After receiving his doctorate, Wang became an assistant professor of informatics at Yuan Ze University, then a professor of law at Shih Hsin University.

== ROC Mainland Affairs Council ==
Wang resigned as minister of the MAC over the dropping of espionage charges brought against Chang Hsien-yao.

=== Cross-strait reciprocal representative offices ===
In mid April 2013, with the plan for Straits Exchange Foundation (SEF) branch office establishment in China and its counterpart Association for Relations Across the Taiwan Straits (ARATS) branch office establishment in Taiwan, Wang said the office will handle trade, consular affairs, cultural exchanges, protection and emergency assistance for Taiwanese residing in China. However, he emphasized that both SEF and ARATS offices are not official government office, and wish to avoid public misperception that Taiwan-China relations is a state-to-state relation.

He added that at the initial phase, Taiwan will set up three SEF branch offices in China, which are in Beijing, central China and southern China. The plan is to establish up to five SEF branch offices. As for ARATS branch offices in Taiwan, he won't allow Beijing to set up ARATS offices in all ROC administrative divisions.

In end of June 2013, when asked if Wang can open the proposed SEF offices in China, he said that as long as the Chinese authorities can address him with his formal ministerial title, then he has no problem with that, nothing that this is not a personal issue, but he is the formal appointed official by the government of the Republic of China, therefore he is representing Taiwan.

=== 2013 cross-strait service trade agreement ===
Commenting on the recently signed Cross-Strait Service Trade Agreement between ARATS and SEF in Shanghai in end of June 2013, speaking at a forum in Hualien City, Wang said that the pact will help Taiwanese business people in reaching further to the Chinese market and it will greatly benefit Taiwanese doing business in China and that this pact will allow the Taiwanese there to stand at an advantage over other foreign competitors. He further added that the pact is an important components of the Economic Cooperation Framework Agreement and that every concession the Chinese authorities has made to the Taiwanese business is greater than those concessions made to other foreign countries.

=== Macau visit ===
In end of August 2013, Wang visited Macau, his first visit after taking office as Minister of MAC. During his visit, he met with the Chief Executive of Macau, Fernando Chui, the first time of such meeting between the two leaders. Both of them referred each other by their official title.

The two ministers discussed education and tourism issues. Chui raised the issue of when Taiwan will recognize school degrees issued in Macau, to which Wang responded positively. Wang also thanked the Government of Macau for the good treatment and respect he received while being in Macau since his arrival in Macau International Airport.

Wang also visited the Taipei Economic and Cultural Office in Macau for the first time since the ROC representative office was renamed to TECO, in line with the rest of ROC representative offices around the world, since 19 July 2011. He also visited Macau historic areas.

=== 2013 APEC Indonesia ===
In October 2013, in a hotel lobby on the sidelines of the APEC Indonesia 2013 meetings in the Indonesian island of Bali, Wang met with Zhang Zhijun, a ground breaking historical meeting for the first time between leader of Taiwan Affairs Office and leader of Mainland Affairs Council, where the two addressed each other by each's official title. Both of them called on the establishment of a regular dialogue mechanism between their two agencies to enhance mutual understanding and facilitate cross-strait engagement. Wang was also invited by Zhang to visit China.

According to the MAC, by addressing each other by their ministerial title, both Wang and Zhang had shown "mutual non-denial" of each side's authority to govern and deepened mutual respect between them. President Ma Ying-jeou, through Presidential Office speaker, expressed his gratification, reiterating that the two sides do not deny each other's authority to govern. The Wang-Zhang meeting also marked a good start for normalizing official interactions across the Taiwan Strait.

=== Wang-Zhang meeting ===
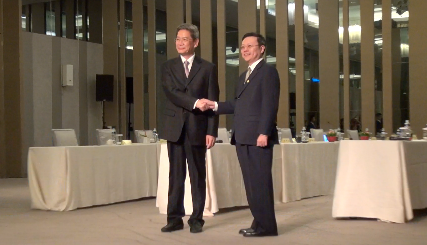
Wang-Zhang meeting in Taiwan

On 11 February 2014, Wang met with Zhang in Nanjing, in the first official, high-level, government-to-government contact between the two sides since 1949. The meeting took place at Purple Palace Nanjing. Nanjing was the capital of the Republic of China during the period in which it actually governed mainland China. During the meeting, Wang and Zhang agreed on establishing a direct and regular communication channel between the two sides for future engagement under the 1992 Consensus. They also agreed on finding a solution for health insurance coverage for Taiwanese students studying in mainland China, on pragmatically establishing SEF and ARATS offices in their respective territories and on studying the feasibility of allowing visits to detained persons once these offices have been established. Before shaking hands, Wang addressed Zhang as "TAO Director Zhang Zhijun" and Zhang addressed Wang as "Minister Wang Yu-chi" without mentioning the name Mainland Affairs Council. However, mainland China's Xinhua News Agency referred to Wang as the "Responsible Official of Taiwan's Mainland Affairs Council" (Chinese: 台湾方面大陆委员会负责人; pinyin: Táiwān Fāngmiàn Dàlù Wěiyuánhuì Fùzé Rén) in its Chinese-language news and as "Taiwan's Mainland Affairs Chief" in its English-language news.

On 25–28 June 2014, Zhang pays a retrospective visit to Taiwan.

=== Meeting with head of ARATS ===
On 27 February 2014, Wang met with Chen Deming, the President of ARATS, in Taipei. This is the first time meeting between the head of MAC and ARATS. Chen referred Wang as "Minister Wang". Wang said he looked forward to closely working with Chen. Chen also said that the recent Wang-Zhang Meeting in Nanjing would bring a better cross-strait relations.

== View on cross-strait relations ==
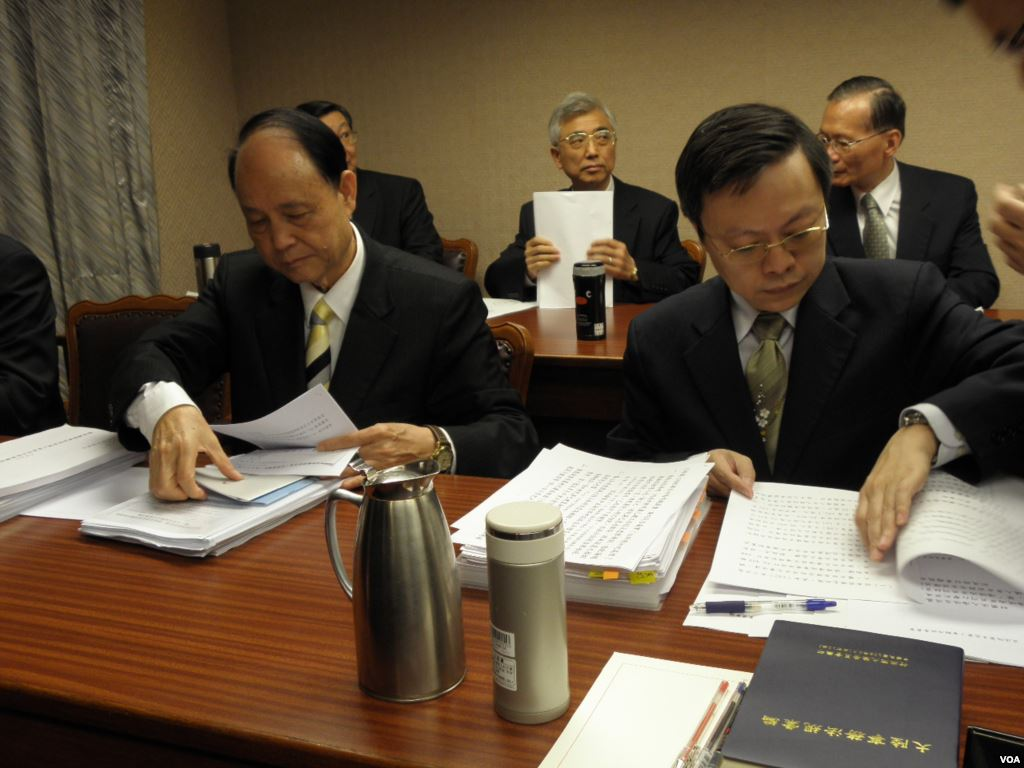
Lin Join-sane and Wang Yu-chi

Wang stated in March 2013 that his view on cross-strait relations is although both Taiwan and mainland China share a close relationship in terms of culture and ethnicity, in terms of democracy, human rights and the rule of law, the two have contrasting stances.

Commenting on the initiative of constitutions with different interpretations (憲法各表) for cross-strait relations between the Democratic Progressive Party (DPP) and the Chinese Communist Party put forth by former Chairman of the DPP Frank Hsiehin mid April 2013, Wang explained that the initiative entails state-to-state relations and will not accepted by Beijing.

In early May 2013, Wang made a statement that if the PRC is willing to remove all of the missiles pointing at Taiwan voluntarily, it would be a gesture of goodwill which Beijing could show to Taipei, because it doesn't need cross-strait negotiation to carry out, only willingness on the part of mainland China. He added also that he wished to see exchange visits by leaders from both sides of the Taiwan Strait and in which both parties address each other using their formal official capacity.

In mid June 2013, Wang stressed the ROC government stance that the One-China policy they have been embracing is the Republic of China. As a sovereign and independent state, cross-strait relations is the relations between the two sides of the Republic of China, which are the Taiwan area and the Mainland area. The relationship is based on the 1992 consensus, that there is only one China, and that China is the Republic of China.

== See also ==
- Cross-Strait relations
- Straits Exchange Foundation
- Taiwan Affairs Office
