= History of cross-strait relations =

History of cross-strait relations relations
- China: Taiwan

West Coast of the Strait	Period	Major cross-strait events	East Coast of the Strait
Song dynasty	1171	Han Chinese fishermen settle on Penghu and soldiers are stationed	Taiwan prehistory
Song dynasty	1225	Penghu is attached to Quanzhou	Taiwan prehistory
Yuan dynasty	1281	Establishment of Penghu Inspection Division	Taiwan prehistory
Yuan dynasty	1349	A Brief History of the Island of Yi by Wang Dayuan	Taiwan prehistory
Ming dynasty	1603	Dongfanji by Chen Di	Taiwan prehistory
Ming dynasty	1624	Battle of Penghu	(Netherlands) (Spain) Under Dutch and Spanish rule
Ming dynasty	1633	Battle of Liaoluo Bay	(Netherlands) (Spain) Under Dutch and Spanish rule
Southern Ming	1661	Siege of Fort Zeelandia	Kingdom of Tungning
Qing dynasty	1667	Ding Wei floating man incident	Kingdom of Tungning
Qing dynasty	1683	Penghu Sea Battle	Kingdom of Tungning
Qing dynasty	1684	Establishment of Taiwan Prefecture	Qing dynasty
Qing dynasty	1731	Ta-Chia-hsi revolt	Qing dynasty
Qing dynasty	1840	First Opium War	Qing dynasty
Qing dynasty	1885	Transformation into a province	Qing dynasty
Qing dynasty	1895	Treaty of Shimonoseki	Japan
Qing dynasty	1900	Xiamen Events	Japan
(Republic of China (1912–1949)) Republic of China	1911	1911 Revolution	Japan
(Republic of China (1912–1949)) Republic of China	1943	1943 Cairo Declaration	Japan
(Republic of China (1912–1949)) Republic of China	1945	Surrender of Japan; Takeover of Taiwan and Penghu	
(Republic of China (1912–1949)) Republic of China	1947	February 28 incident	
People's Republic of China	1949	Relocation of the National Government	Republic of China (Taiwan)
People's Republic of China	1978	Reform and opening up	Republic of China (Taiwan)
People's Republic of China	1979	Second Taiwan Strait Crisis	Republic of China (Taiwan)
People's Republic of China	1987	Open cross-strait family visits	Republic of China (Taiwan)
People's Republic of China	1993	Wang–Koo summit	Republic of China (Taiwan)
People's Republic of China	1996	Third Taiwan Strait Crisis	Republic of China (Taiwan)
People's Republic of China	2001	Cross-strait implementation of the Little Three Way	Republic of China (Taiwan)
People's Republic of China	2010	Cross-strait signing of ECFA	Republic of China (Taiwan)
People's Republic of China	2014	Disputes over the Trade and Services Census; The Sunflower Movement	Republic of China (Taiwan)
People's Republic of China	2015	First Ma–Xi meeting	Republic of China (Taiwan)
People's Republic of China	2022	2022 Chinese military exercises around Taiwan	Republic of China (Taiwan)
People's Republic of China	Present	Political status of Taiwan	Republic of China (Taiwan)

The term cross-strait relations has been used to describe the relationship between China and Taiwan. Suspected records of Taiwan in the history of China date back to the earliest times, when the legendary region of "Yizhou" was mentioned in the "Three Kingdoms", or Liuqiu in the Book of Sui. During the Song dynasty and the Mongol-led Yuan dynasty, there was trade between the two sides of the Strait, and in 1281, Kublai Khan established the Penghu Inspection Division, which began to exercise administrative jurisdiction over Penghu. In 1349, Wang Dayuan documented in Island Yi Zhi Lu that Penghu belonged to Jinjiang County, Quanzhou, and that Liuqiu was one of the overseas countries. The "Dongfan Ji", written by Chen Di in the Ming Dynasty, depicts the customs of the aborigines in southwest Taiwan. Since the 1620s, cross-strait relations have been influenced by the Dutch, the Spanish, the Han Chinese, the Manchus, and the Japanese, and mainland China and Taiwan have either unified or separated, with ups and downs.

In 1945, World War II ended and the Republic of China took over Taiwan. Cross-strait relations developed in a tortuous manner in response to changes in the domestic and international situation. In the second Chinese Communist Revolution, the Nationalist Army led by the Kuomintang was defeated by the Liberation Army led by the Chinese Communist Party (CCP). In 1949, the People's Republic of China was established and gradually took control of mainland China. The Republic of China, on the other hand, retreated to Taiwan, Penghu, Jinma, and other islands. The CCP tried to take Taiwan, and the Kuomintang prepared to counter-attack the mainland. A military confrontation between the two sides of the Taiwan Strait began and many armed clashes took place.

After the People's Republic of China replaced the Republic of China (ROC) as a permanent member of the United Nations Security Council in 1971, the foreign relations of Taiwan were limited. On January 1, 1979, the People's Republic of China established diplomatic relations with the United States and, at the same time, announced the end of the shelling of Kinmen and proposed a policy of "peaceful reunification" under one country, two systems. In 1987, after the Republic of China lifted the curfew and opened up cross-strait family visits, cross-strait relations became smoother. But in 1995, when President Lee Teng-hui visited the United States, cross-strait relations became tense again. After entering the 21st century, the economic relations between the two sides of the Taiwan Strait became quite close, and, in 2018, when the KMT returned to power in Taiwan, cross-strait relations eased. The meeting of the top leaders across the Taiwan Strait in Singapore in 2015 was seen as a major breakthrough in the history of cross-strait relations. And since the return of the Democratic Progressive Party to power in 2016, cross-strait relations have become tense again.

== Historical Stages ==
There is no universally accepted standard regarding the beginning of cross-strait relations or historical chronology. In his book "History of Cross-Strait Relations," Professor Zhang Chunying, deputy director of the Institute of Taiwan Studies at Zhongnan University of Economics and Law, divides the history of cross-strait relations into four periods: the first stage is from the prehistoric period to the Dutch occupation of Taiwan in the 1620s; the second stage is the period from the Dutch, Ming Zheng, Qing, and Japanese rule of Taiwan, to the takeover of Taiwan by the Republic of China in 1945; the third stage is the cross-strait military confrontation formed after the withdrawal of the central government of the Republic of China from mainland China in 1949; the fourth stage is the end of the military confrontation between the two sides of the Taiwan Strait since the 1980s and the de-escalation and development of relations. Professor Shao Zonghai of the Institute of Zhongshan and mainland China Studies at the Chinese Culture University divides the history of cross-strait relations after 1949 into five periods: military confrontation, legal disputes, exchange and détente, ideological confrontation, and reciprocal consultation.

== Pre-modern Times ==
=== Period of the Three Kingdoms (suspected) ===
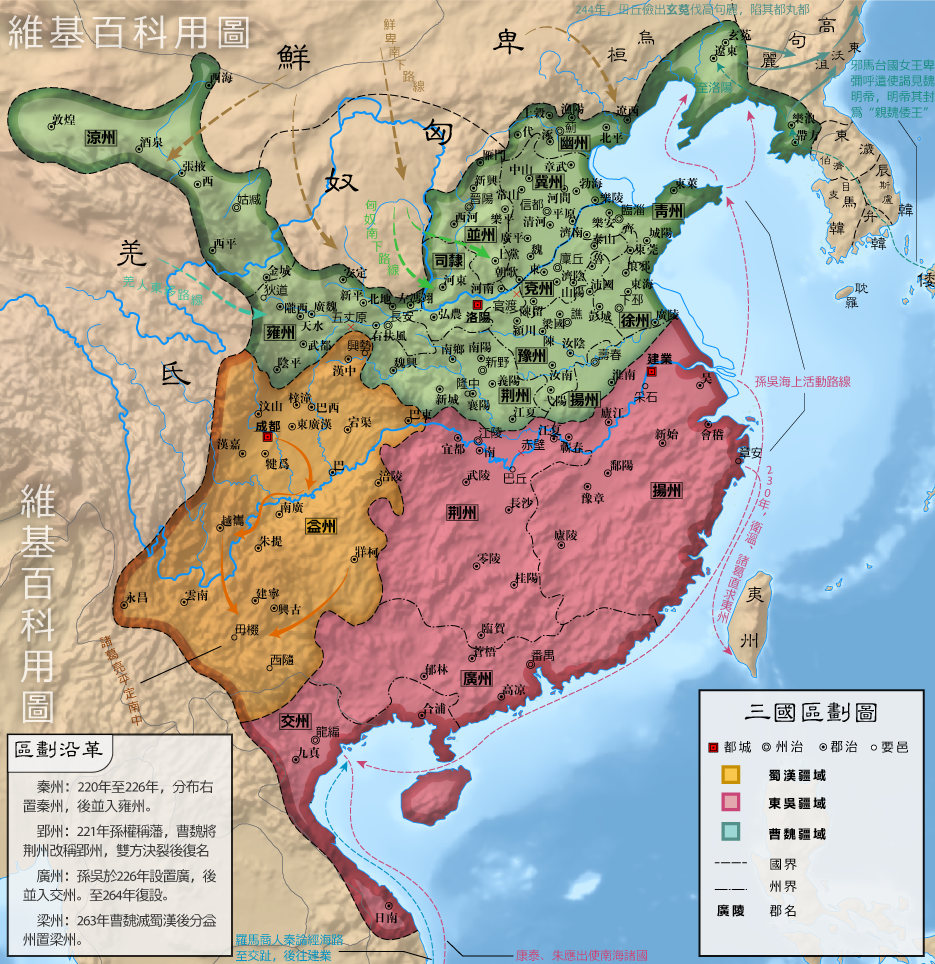
Some scholars believe that Yizhou in the Three Kingdoms was Taiwan, but the view is controversial

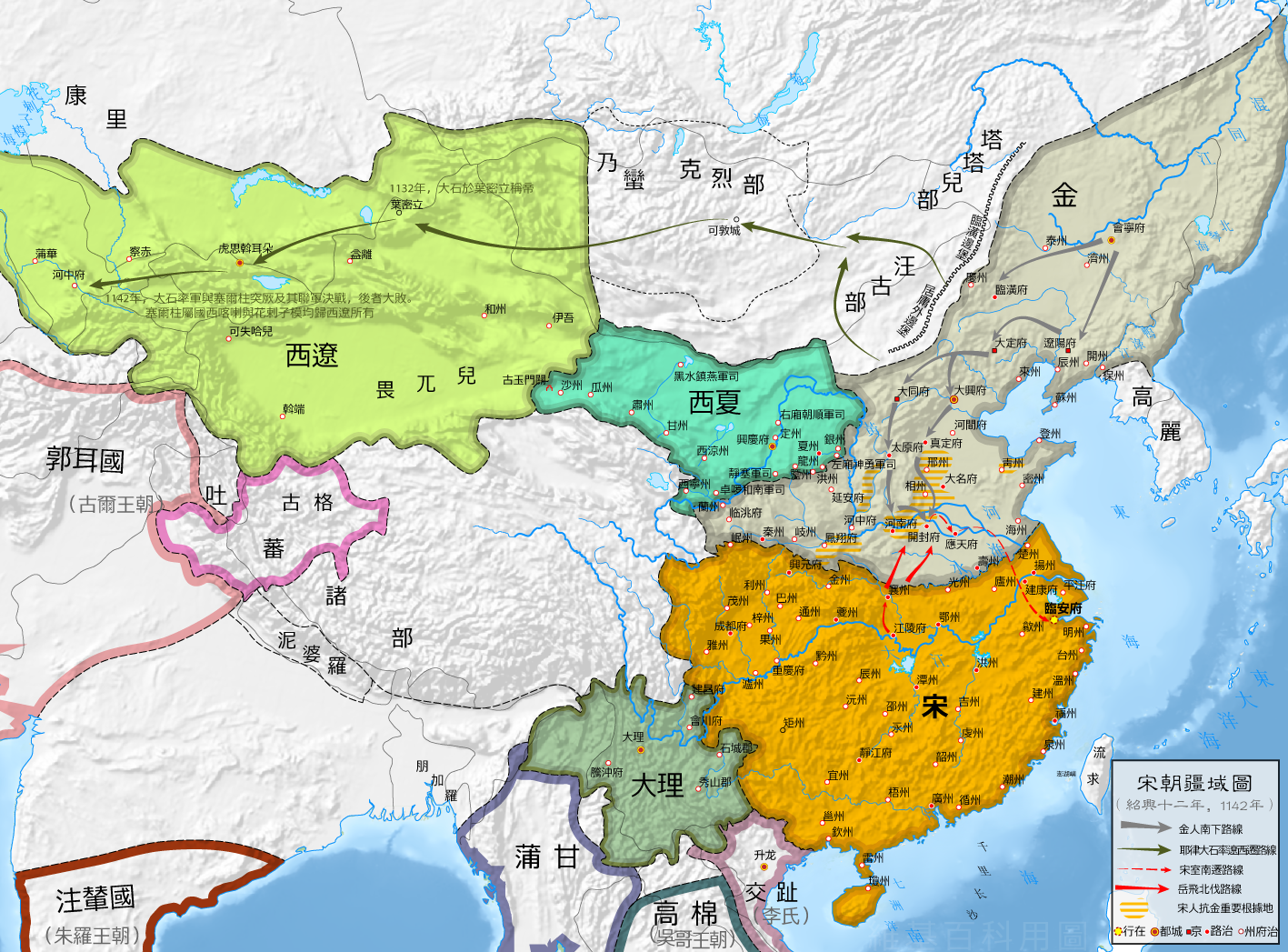
Southern Song Dynasty with Penghu and Liuqiu

The Chinese history book, "Records of the Three Kingdoms – Wu Zhi" records that in the first month of spring in the second year of Huanglong (230), Eastern Wu sent generals Wei Wen and Zhuge Zhi with 10,000 soldiers to cross the sea from Zhang'an in Linhai County in search of Yizhou, and thousands of them landed on Yizhou and returned. In addition, the book "Linhai Water and Land" written by Shen Ying, the governor of Danyang in Eastern Wu, records that Yizhou is 2,000 miles southeast of Linhai County, where "the land is free of frost and snow, (Note: Whether the original text is "Yizhou" or "Yi Zhou" is uncertain.) and the grass and trees do not die; on all sides are mountains, where many mountain barbarians live." Some scholars believe that Yizhou refers to Taiwan but there is controversy, while others believe that Yizhou refers to the Ryukyu Islands.

=== Sui and Tang dynasties (suspected) ===
According to the Book of Sui, Liuqiu was located on a sea island, east of Jian'an County, and could be reached by boat in five days. (Note: Jian'an County is located in present-day Fujian Province, and has four counties under its jurisdiction: Min (present-day Fuzhou City, Fujian Province), Jian'an, Nan'an, and Longxi.) There is also a record of Emperor Yang of Sui sending troops to attack Liuqiu, three times in total. The first time was in 607, but because of the language barrier, only one person was "swept away and returned". The following year, Zhu Kuan made a second attack, but they only "took his armor and returned". The third time was in 610, when Chen Rong and Zhang Zhenzhou led an army and captured thousands of men and women, and returned. Some scholars believe that the Riuqui Kingdom recorded in the Sui Shu is today's Taiwan, but others believe that the Riuqui Kingdom refers to the Ryukyu Islands.

=== Song and Yuan dynasties ===
In 1171, Wang Dayou was the governor of Quanzhou, an area under the jurisdiction of Emperor Xiaozong, who had an island called Penghu, where many Han Chinese lived. In order to prevent harassment, every year when the south wind rose, Wang Dayou sent troops to defend, costing the army money, but it was still too much to handle. So he built 200 houses and dispatched generals to reside in them. There are few records about the cross-strait trade during the Song and Yuan dynasties, but from the large number of ceramics excavated during the Song and Yuan dynasties, Penghu should have been an important stopover for the foreign trade of mainland China at that time. According to the records, during the Song and Yuan dynasties, iron was a high-priced commodity in Taiwan, and the aborigines in Taiwan often had to wait for merchant ships from mainland China to dock and exchange food for iron from the people on board. In his "Journal of the East of the Sea", Zhu Jingying of the Qing Dynasty said that he had received hundreds of Song money at the Chiayi port.

In 1225, the Book of Barbarian Nations anecdotally indicated that Penghu was attached to Jinjiang, Quanzhou Prefecture. A group of Quanzhou immigrants lived on Penghu.

In 1281, Kublai Khan sent an envoy to invade Japan, and most of his ships were sunk by a typhoon, and the remnants drifted to the west coast of Taiwan and Penghu. In 1292, Yuan Shizu sent an ambassador to appease Liuqiu, but after arriving, he could not speak the language with the locals and returned without success. In the third year of Temür Khan's reign (1297), Fujian Province's Pingshang Minister of State was pleased to send provincial governor Zhang Hao and Fuzhou's new army Zhang Jin to the Ryukyu Kingdom, capturing more than 130 people and returning. In the first month of the next year, the captured Ryukyu people were released and asked to submit to the Yuan Dynasty, but nothing happened after that. In 1330 and 1337, Wang Dayuan left from Quanzhou twice to trade with other countries. He recorded in the "Island Yi Zhi Lu" that Penghu belonged to Jinjiang County of Quanzhou, and Ryukyu was one of the overseas countries.

== Modern times ==
=== Ming dynasty ===
It is recorded in the "Dongfanji" (An Account of the Eastern Barbarians) by Chen Di that Zheng He visited Taiwan during his expedition in the early years of Yongle, when the Dongfangyi (aborigines of Taiwan) hid and did not want to obey the restrictions, so Zheng He gave each family a brass bell to tie around their necks. The bronze bell was treated as a treasure by them. It is recorded in the "Taiwan Prefecture Gazetteer" by Gao Gongqian that during the Xuande period, Zheng He's fleet went to Taiwan to draw water at the head of Dajingfang, and he also threw medicine into the water to heal the sicknesses of the local indigenous people.

The territory of Taiwan is described in the "History of Ming Dynasty" by Zhang Tingyu of the Qing Dynasty as "its land, from the north to the highest peak in the south, can be more than 1,000 miles; in the east from Doroman, in the west to Wangcheng, can be more than 900 miles". It is worth noting that Jigong, together with Ryukyu, Luzon, and Brunei, was included in the chapter of "The Fourth of the Two Hundred and Eleven Foreign Countries", which was not included in the Ming Dynasty's territory.

==== Trade ====
By the early 16th century, increasing numbers of Chinese fishermen, traders and pirates were visiting the southwestern part of the island. Some merchants from Fujian were familiar enough with the indigenous peoples of Taiwan to speak Formosan languages. The people of Fujian sailed closer to Taiwan and the Ryukyus in the mid-16th century to trade with Japan while evading Ming authorities. Chinese who traded in Southeast Asia also began taking an East Sea Compass Course (dongyang zhenlu) that passed southwestern and southern Taiwan. Some of them traded with the Taiwanese aborigines. During this period, Taiwan was referred to as Xiaodong dao ("little eastern island") and Dahui guo ("the country of Dahui"), a corruption of Tayouan, a tribe that lived on an islet near modern Tainan from which the name "Taiwan" is derived. By the late 16th century, Chinese from Fujian were settling in southwestern Taiwan.

In 1593, Ming officials started issuing ten licenses each year for Chinese junks to trade in northern Taiwan. Chinese records show that after 1593, each year five licenses were granted for trade in Keelung and five licenses for Tamsui. However these licenses merely acknowledged already existing illegal trade at these locations.

Initially Chinese merchants arrived in northern Taiwan and sold iron and textiles to the aboriginal peoples in return for coal, sulfur, gold, and venison. Later the southwestern part of Taiwan surpassed northern Taiwan as the destination for Chinese traders. The southwest had mullet fish, which drew more than a hundred fishing junks from Fujian each year during winter. The fishing season lasted six to eight weeks. Some of them camped on Taiwan's shores and many began trading with the indigenous people for deer products. The southwestern Taiwanese trade was of minor importance until after 1567 when it was used as a way to circumvent the ban on Sino-Japanese trade. The Chinese bought deerskins from the aborigines and sold them to the Japanese for a large profit.

When a Portuguese ship sailed past southwestern Taiwan in 1596, several of its crew members who had been shipwrecked there in 1582 noticed that the land had become cultivated and now had people working it, presumably by settlers from Fujian. When the Dutch arrived in 1623, they found about 1,500 Chinese visitors and residents. Most of them were engaged in seasonal fishing, hunting, and trading. The population fluctuated throughout the year peaking during winter. A small minority brought Chinese plants with them and grew crops such as apples, oranges, bananas, watermelons. Some estimates of the Chinese population put it at 2,000. There were two Chinese villages. The larger one was located on an island that formed the Bay of Tayouan. It was inhabited year-round. The smaller village was located on the mainland and would eventually become the city of Tainan. In the early 17th century, a Chinese man described it as being inhabited by pirates and fishermen. One Dutch visitor noted that an aboriginal village near the Sino-Japanese trade center had a large number of Chinese and there was "scarcely a house in this village... that does not have one or two or three, or even five or six Chinese living there." The villagers' speech contained many Chinese words and sounded like "a mixed and broken language."

==== Piracy ====
In the 42nd year of Jiajing (1563), Lin Daoqian, a pirate of Quanzhou origin, gathered against the Ming Dynasty and was pursued by Yu Dayou, the Ming Governor, and fled to Taiwan to settle in Jigong via Penghu. He led hundreds of followers and enslaved the aborigines in Taiwan. The Aborigines were so angry that they agreed to kill Lin Daoqian, but the news leaked out and they were killed by Lin Daoqian in a night attack. After Lin Daoqian, Lin Feng, the leader of the Chaozhou pirates, was chased by Hu Shouren, the Ming Dynasty's chief soldier, in 1574 and fled to Penghu, and then to Taiwan's Sprite Harbor (Bajang Xi Kou) as his base. When Hu Shouren sent an order to the pirates to attack, Lin Feng and the others fled. He later returned to Wankan on 27 December 1575 but left for Southeast Asia after losing a naval encounter with Ming forces on 15 January 1576.

According to legend, in 1621, Pedro Yan Shiqi, a Zhangzhou citizen, came to Taiwan from Nagasaki, Japan, and set up a fortress in the area of Zhu Luo Mountain, engaging in farming, hunting, and trading activities. When the news spread back to the mainland, it attracted a large number of poor people from Zhangzhou and Quanzhou to come across the sea and join them, numbering as many as 3,000 people. In 1625 Yan Shiqi died of illness, and Zheng Zhilong (Koxinga's father) succeeded him. (Note: In the 13th year of Chongzhen (1640), the Ming court promoted Zheng Zhilong to be the chief military officer of Fujian, and he was appointed as the Dudou Tongji (from the first rank).) In 1628 (the first year of Chongzhen) in September, Zheng Zhilong was recruited by the Ming court and returned to the mainland with more than 30,000 men and more than 1,000 ships as the "Five Tiger Guerrilla General" and was stationed in Anhai. During the Fujian disaster, Zheng Zhilong sent tens of thousands of starving people to Taiwan to earn a living, and the related expenses were then returned to Zheng Zhilong in the form of rent and taxes. In addition, Zheng Zhilong broke the Haijin and almost monopolized the trade between the coast of mainland China and Taiwan, Macau, Japan, and the Philippines.

=== Wokou ===
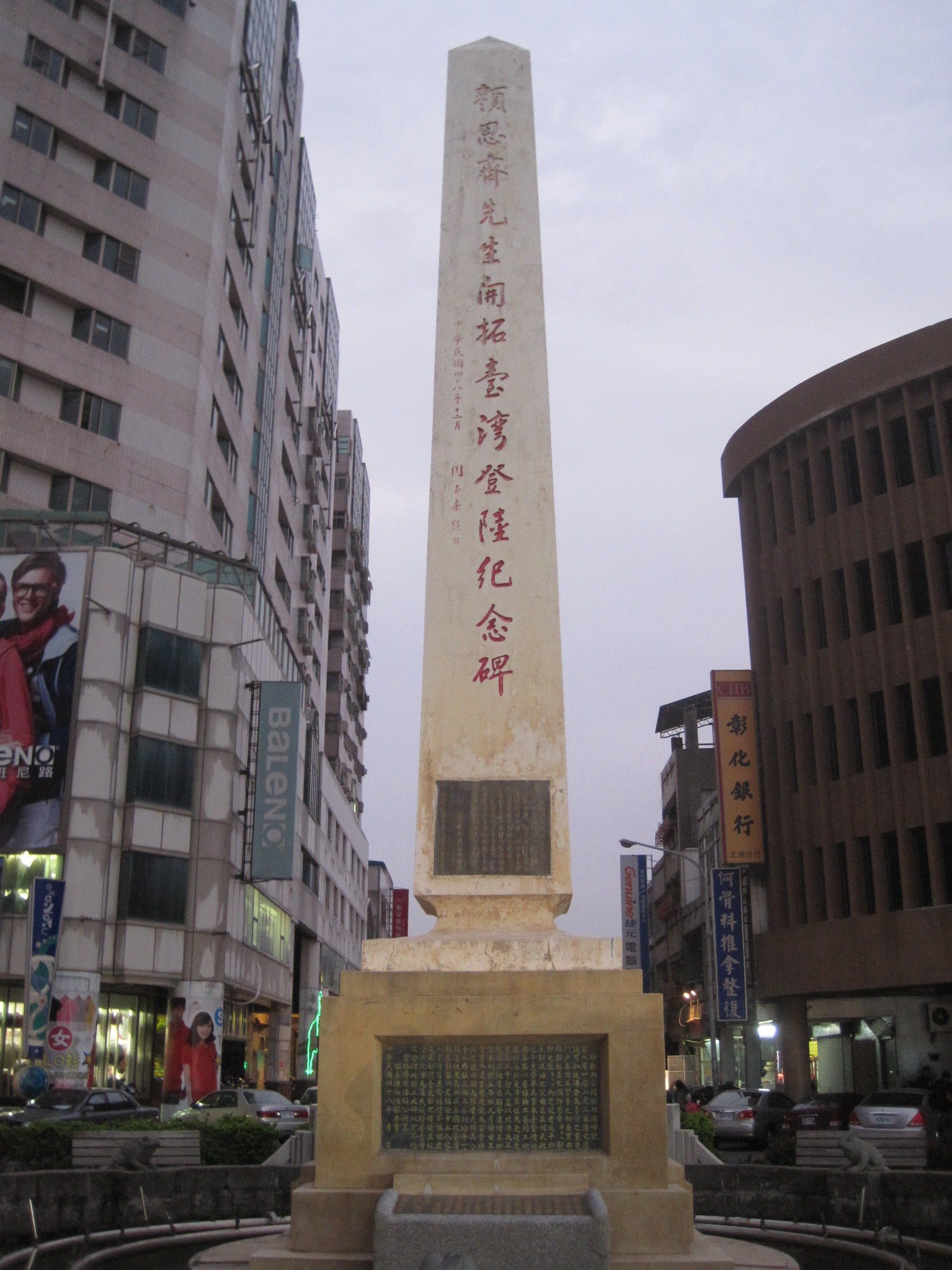
The monument to the landing of Yan Siqi in Beigang

According to Shen Yourong of Wuyu, a Ming coast guard general, who wrote in the "Minhai Gift", he had "entered Dongfan three times to destroy the Japanese and drive away the Dutch". In July 1602, the Wokou plundered the coastal areas of Guangdong, Fujian, and Zhejiang, and then fled to Dongfan as their lair. On the one hand, Fujian Quanzhou defender Shen Youyong Duji sent people to scout the enemy, understand the climate, wind direction and sea current, build ships, train troops and store food. In the winter of the same year, Zhu Yunchang, the governor of Fujian, issued a secret order to "fight against the Japanese in the East" and Shen Youyong led 24 ships across the sea to Taiwan and defeated the Japanese. He burned and sank 6 Japanese ships, beheaded 15 heads and took back more than 370 captives. Shen Youyong was stationed in Da Ren for more than 20 days. After Shen defeated the wokou, he met with the chieftain Damila, who presented gifts of deer and liquor as thanks for getting rid of the pirates. Chen Di, who was accompanying him, witnessed these events and wrote an account of Taiwan known as Dongfanji (An Account of the Eastern Barbarians).

=== Europeans ===
China proper on the west coast of the strait was the Ming Dynasty, and the Penghu Islands in the strait were controlled by Ming troops, while the island of Taiwan on the east coast of the strait was ruled by Dutch, Spanish, and aboriginal regimes

In 1604, when Wybrand van Warwijck, the Dutch Vice admiral, occupied Penghu, Shen Youyong, the Ming Dynasty's chief minister of Wuzhou, led 50 ships (about 2,000 men) to Penghu and asked Wei Malang to leave. Due to the disparity in strength between the two sides, Wei Malang left Penghu on December 15 and went to Taiwan to find a stronghold. This incident is recorded on the monument of Shen Youyong's advice to the retreat of the Red Maoists in the Penghu Tianhou Temple.

In 1622, Jan Pieterszoon Coen, the governor of the Dutch East India Company in Indonesia, sent Lei Yosheng to Penghu and established Fengguiwei Fort as a trading base.

In 1624, Ming General Yu Dayou led an army to surround the Dutch and after eight months of fierce battle, the Dutch evacuated Penghu and moved to Taiwan to set up Fort Zeelandia as a base. The Dutch East India Company recruited Han Chinese from the coast of Fujian Province of China and Penghu to cultivate in Taiwan, and many of them later settled in Taiwan. The genealogy of the Yan clan in Anhai and the genealogy of the Guo clan in Fenyang, and Dongshi both contain records of the migration of families into Taiwan.

In 1626, the Spaniard Vardes led a fleet of ships from Manila, Philippines, along the east coast of Taiwan to Keelung Island in Keelung City to establish the city of San Salvador as the center of rule. Although the Spaniards were not allowed to start official trade with the Ming Dynasty, they attracted smugglers to do business in Jilong by exempting them from customs duties, tariff, and even entry inspection.

In 1633 (the sixth year of Chongzhen), the Dutch East India Company used Taiwan as a base to blockade and plunder the coast of Fujian on the mainland. The Ming navy under the leadership of Zheng Zhilong defeated the Dutch East India Company and the pirate alliance, which is known as the Battle of Liaoluo Bay. The Han Chinese in Taiwan also rebelled against Dutch rule, the better known being the Guo Huaiyi rebellion in 1652. At that time, 4,000 to 5,000 Han Chinese participated, about a quarter of the total number of Han Chinese in Taiwan, and were suppressed after 12 days, with 3,000 to 4,000 Han Chinese dead.

=== Koxinga fights against the Dutch ===
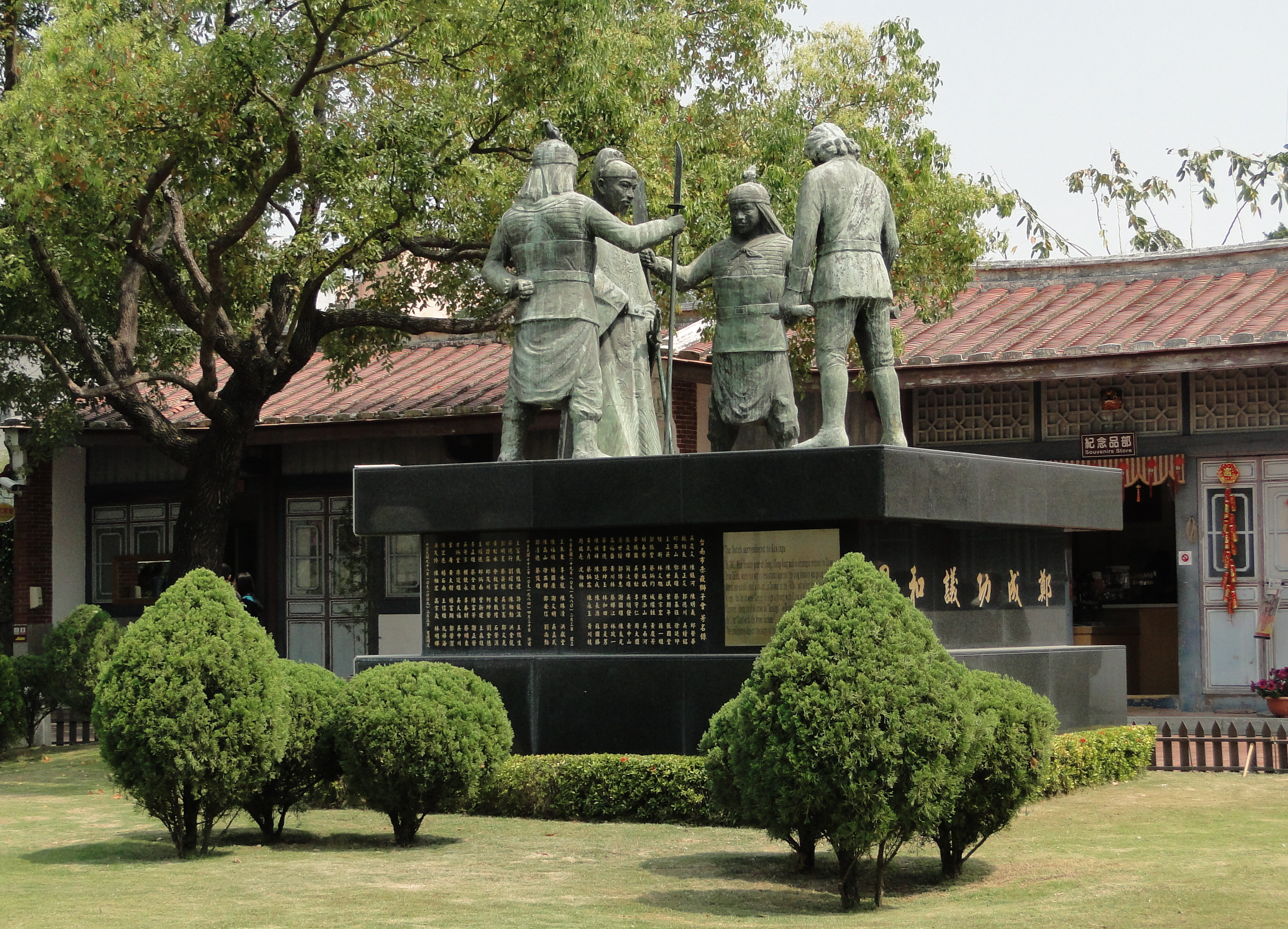
Statue of Dutch people surrendering to Koxinga

In 1644, the Ming Dynasty fell, and the Ming clans of Zhu Yousong, Zhu Yihai, and Zhu Yujian established the Southern Ming regime. Among them, Zhu Yujian of Tang was crowned emperor by the brothers Zheng Zhilong and Zheng Hongkui in 1645 in Fuzhou. In 1646, the Qing army entered Fujian, Zheng Zhilong surrendered to the Qing Dynasty, and Zheng Chenggong left for Kinmen. (Note: After Zheng Chenggong came to Taiwan, he received King Lu's son Zhu Honghuan, King Luxi Zhu Ci Kuang, King Badong Zhu Jiang, King Le'an Zhu Jun, King Shucheng Zhu Zhi, King Fengnan Zhu, King Yi Zhu Zirconium, and other Ming clansmen to Taiwan.) In 1647, Zheng Chenggong formally swore to rebel against the Qing Dynasty under the name of House of Zhu and recruited and claimed the surname of the sinful subjects of the great general, and fought for more than ten years in the southeast coast of China, and helped the Ming clan and the people to cross the sea and settle in Taiwan. Since the Dutch often robbed Chinese merchant ships, Zheng Chenggong warned the Dutch twice between the tenth (1656) and fourteenth (1660) years of the Yongli era to stop robbing merchant ships or they would not trade with them. In April 1661, Zheng Chenggong led 25,000 soldiers and hundreds of warships into Taiwan under the name of "Great General of the Ming Recruiting Army" and forced the Dutch East India Company to sign a contract of surrender on February 1, 1662, after the Battle of Jelanzai. Zheng Chenggong set up Chengtianfu in Taiwan and tried to rebel against the Qing Dynasty and restore the Ming Dynasty, but he died soon afterward. After Cheng Cheng succeeded to the throne, due to the fear of insufficient legitimacy of his rule, he welcomed the Great Ming King of Ningjing, Zheng Jing, from Kinmen to Taiwan in 1663 and renamed Taiwan as Dongning, still serving the Ming dynasty in name and setting up the Tainan Confucian Temple in 1665.

On April 21, 1674, Geng Jingzhong, the King of Jingnan of the Qing Dynasty, rose against the Qing Dynasty and invited Zheng Jing across the sea for a western expedition. After Zheng Jing crossed the sea, he asked Geng Jingzhong to claim Zhangzhou and Quanzhou, but after being refused, he sent troops to occupy Haicheng and Tong'an District, and the two sides began to fight. In 1675, Geng Jingzhong negotiated with Zheng Jing to settle the war with Fengting as the boundary, the north belonged to Geng and the south to Zheng. In 1676, Zheng Jing defeated the Pingnan King Shang Zhixin and occupied Huizhou. After Zheng Jing had the four state capitals of Zhang, Quan, Chaozhou, and Huizhou, he captured Tingzhou, and Geng Jingzhong had to surrender to the Qing Dynasty. After Geng Jingzhong surrendered to the Qing Dynasty, Zheng Jing, who faced the Qing army alone, was defeated and finally retreated to Xiamen.

In 1677, the Qing Dynasty started peace talks with Zheng Jing again, and Prince Kang of the Qing Dynasty promised in a letter that if Zheng Jing retreated from the islands off the coast of China, he would promise to make Dongning a vassal of the Qing Dynasty in the same way as Korea, and to trade with Dongning without suspicion forever. In 1678, a letter from the Qing general Lai Ta to Zheng Jing claimed that if Zheng's army was willing to retreat to Taiwan, then Zheng could stay in Taiwan forever, with the same status as Joseon and Japan, without having to shave his hair and change his clothes, and pay tribute to his subjects all by his own will. In 1680, Zheng Jing was defeated and retreated from Xiamen to Taiwan. On March 17, 1681, when Zheng Jing died, the important officer Feng Xifan killed Zheng Kezang and established his brother Zheng Keshuang, which led to the deterioration of the state and the disintegration of the people.

The administrative boundaries of Taiwan Province in Fujian in 1894, with the uncontrolled territories in black and the claimed control of the Taitung Prefecture in gray

=== Qing Dynasty included Taiwan in its map ===
On July 10, 1683 (the 22nd year of Kangxi), the Kangxi Emperor of the Qing Dynasty sent Shi Lang to attack Taiwan with more than 20,000 troops and 200 ships on land and water. After seven days of fierce fighting, the elite of Zheng Keshuang's army was completely wiped out. On July 20, the King of Ningjing, Zhu Jungui, committed suicide and martyred himself, while Zheng Ke-chiao formally submitted his surrender on September 17, and on October 3, Qing troops entered Taiwan to accept the surrender. In the following year, Taiwan was established as Taiwan Prefecture, which was under the jurisdiction of Taiwan, Fengshan and Zhu Luo counties, and was subordinate to Taixia Province of Fujian Province, and promulgated the "Rules of Taiwan for the Investigation of Exile" to strictly control the number of mainland Han Chinese crossing into Taiwan. At the early stage of the establishment of Taiwan, the Qing court authorized the Fujian governor to transfer officials from the mainland of Fujian Province to Taiwan from each other. Therefore, most of the officials in Taiwan during the Qing Dynasty were from Fuzhou.

In 1721, Zhu Yigui made himself king of Taiwan and named his country "Da Ming", but he was soon destroyed by the Qing army, and in late 1731 (the ninth year of the Yongzheng era of the Qing Dynasty), the Taokas people, the aborigines of Taiwan, launched an armed resistance against the government. Hao Yulin, the acting governor of Fujian at that time, sent Wang County, the chief soldier of Taiwan, to supervise the conquest, and more than 6,000 soldiers were recruited from mainland China to conquer Taiwan. The incident lasted for seven months, and finally, the chiefs of Taiwan surrendered at the head of the army. Thirteen chiefs, including Lin Li, were executed in accordance with the Qing law, and the Shalong chief was found guilty of abetting the conspiracy and was sentenced to death.

After the Qing court ruled Taiwan, trade between Taiwan and the mainland became more prosperous. At that time, Taiwan's main exports were rice, deer skins, and sugar, and imports were textiles, herbs, and other daily necessities, and the three main trading ports were Fucheng (now Tainan Anping), Lugang (now Changhua Lugang), and Monga (now Taipei Wanhua). The common name "One Fu, Two Lu and Three Monga" describes the most prosperous trading ports during this period. In the middle of the Qing Dynasty, a large number of immigrants came to Taiwan, and there were many conflicts of interest between the first and second arriving groups. For example, there were Min-Yue armed battles between the He-lo people of Fujian and the Hakka and Chaozhou people of Guangdong; Quan-Zhang armed battles between the Quanzhou and Zhangzhou people of Fujian; and Xipi-Fulu armed battles between the Xiqu schools. However, there were also collaborations among the various ethnic groups in Taiwan during this period. For example, in 1796, when Wu Sha was reclaiming Clam Chai, there were Zhang, Quan and Hakka people who joined the reclamation.

=== Governance of Taiwan in the late Qing Dynasty ===
After the Second Opium War in 1860, the Qing government agreed to open Taiwan to trade in Anping and Danshui, and soon opened the two ports of Dog and Jidong. 1874, Japan sent troops to Taiwan to create the Mudangsha Incident. 1875, the Qing government sent Shen Baozhen as the Minister of the Imperial Household to Taiwan for inspection, and transferred 6,500 men from Tang Dingkui's army stationed in Xuzhou to Taiwan for garrisoning. In the end, it was settled by the signing of the Beijing Treaty between China and Japan. This diplomatic incident prompted the Qing court to lift the ban on mainland Chinese people crossing to Taiwan for cultivation, and Taiwan was fully opened up.

During the Sino-French War in 1884, French Admiral Lupo occupied Keelung, attacked Danshui, blocked the Taiwan Strait, and harassed the Chinese coastal provinces. On July 29, 1885, Zuo Zongtang explained the reasons for the rapid transformation of Taiwan into a province in his "Request for the transfer of the governor of Fujian to Taiwan to take charge of Taiwan's defense". In October of the same year, the Qing court established the Fujian Province of Taiwan to control the former Fujian Province of Taiwan and Taipei Province. During his tenure as governor of Taiwan, Liu Ming Chuan expanded the number of provinces, created new counties, and promoted a series of foreign affairs reforms, making Taiwan the most modernized province in the Qing Empire at that time.

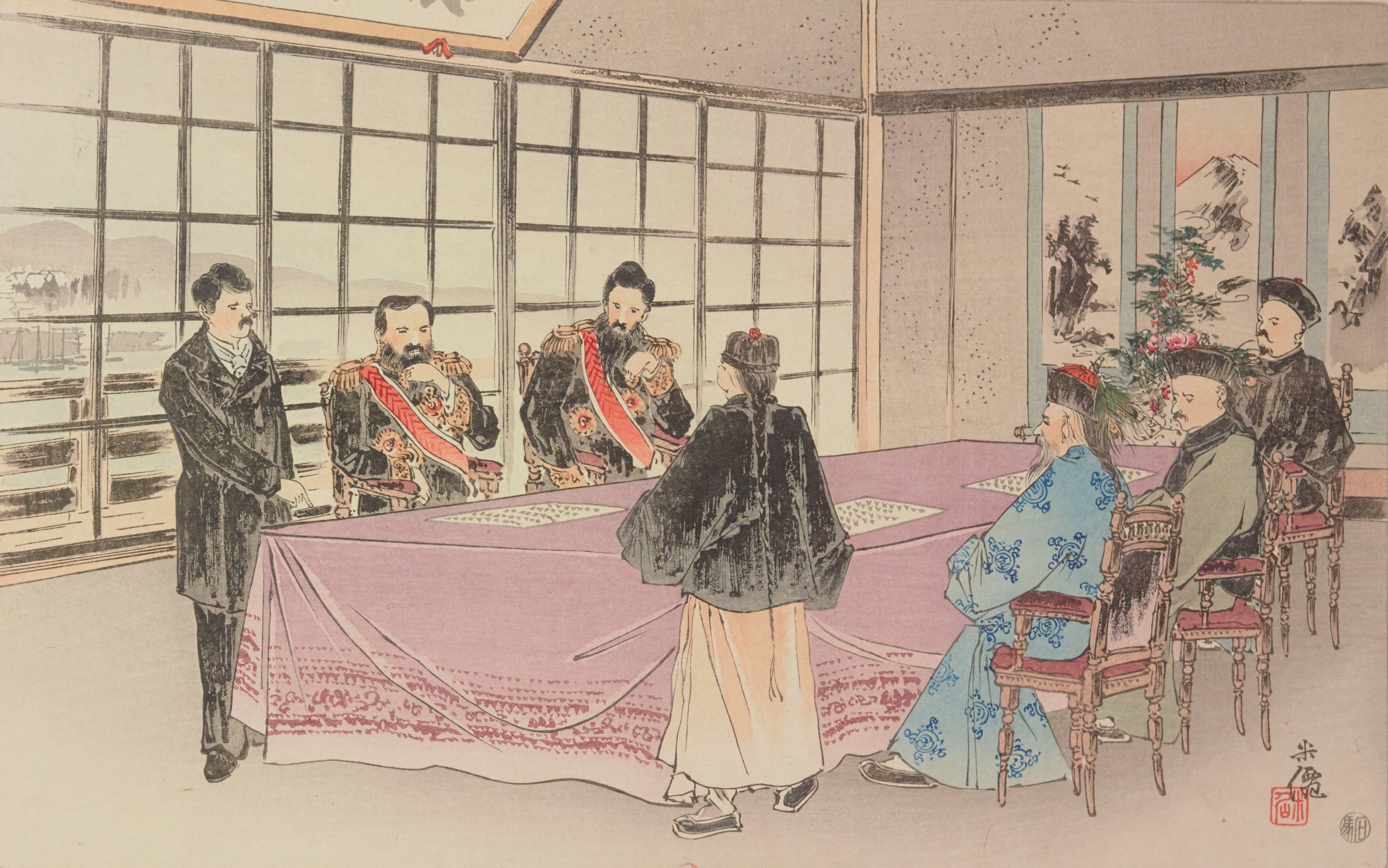
Japanese drawing of the signing of the Treaty of Shimonoseki

=== Qing Dynasty ceded Taiwan to Japan ===
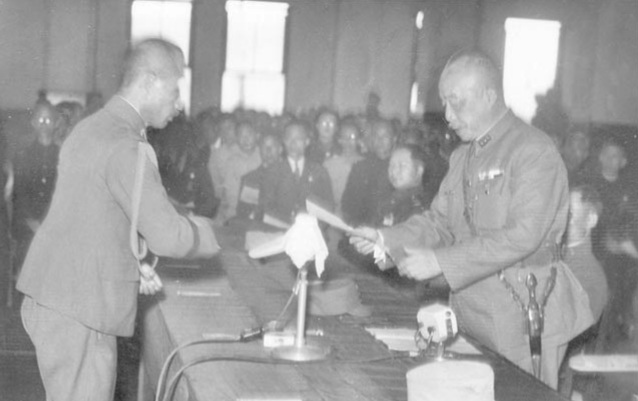
On October 25, 1945, at Zhongshan Hall, General Rikichi Andō signed and stamped on the Receipt of Order No. 1 of General Chen Yi's Department, and then passed it to General Chen Yi via General Haruki Kikeyama

Qing Dynasty was defeated by Japan in the Sino-Japanese War and signed the Treaty of Shimonoseki on April 17, 1895, ceding Taiwan and Penghu to Japan. The news reached Taiwan, and the then governor of Taiwan, Tang Jingsong, issued the "Declaration of Independence of Taiwan Democracy" on May 25, but still held the Qing Dynasty as the suzerain state. on June 2, both Qing and Japan completed the handover of Taiwan, and the Japanese army entered Tainan on October 21 to exterminate the regime of Taiwan Democracy. Taiwan became a Japanese colony and a base for the Japanese invasion of mainland China. The Taiwan Governorate, as the vanguard of the Japanese Empire's implementation of its southward policy, formulated policies specifically for Fujian and carried out cultural infiltration by founding schools, setting up hospitals, building shrines and operating newspapers on the mainland, which had a profound impact on the development of modern Fujian society.

Around 1896, the then governor of Taiwan, Kodama Gentarō, sent the then abbot of Lanyang Temple in Yilan, Taiwan, Venerable Gasshohiro to Xiamen to preach. On August 24, 1900, the temple was burned down and on August 25, the Japanese governor of Taiwan sent an army to cross the sea and prepare to occupy Xiamen. The Western powers reacted strongly, and the British, Germans, Americans and Russians all brought their warships into the Port of Xiamen, and the British marines landed in the British Concession. This is known as the "Xiamen Incident" in history.

After the founding of the Republic of China in 1912, Taiwan's Chiang Wei-Shui, Tu Tsung-ming and Weng Chun-Ming joined the Taiwan branch of the Tongmenghui one after another. 1928 saw the establishment of the Taiwan Communist Party in the Shanghai French Concession under the guidance of the Chinese Communist Party (CCP), which advocated the overthrow of Japanese rule in Taiwan and the establishment of the Taiwan Republic. After September 1931, the Taiwan Communist Party ceased operations due to the arrest and imprisonment of a large number of party members. In 1934 and 1936, the Fujian provincial government twice organized delegations to Taiwan for inspection. when Japanese rule over Taiwan began in 1895, Taiwan's economy was not yet as large as that of Fujian. However, after nearly 40 years of Japanese operation, Taiwan had far surpassed Fujian. Therefore, the Taiwan Study Tour Report recommended Fujian learn from Taiwan's economic model.

After the outbreak of the Sino-Japanese War in 1937, Taiwanese civilians living in China, under the leadership of Li Youbang, formed the Taiwan Volunteer Force to fight against Japan. On February 23, 1938, the Soviet Volunteer Group bombed the Taihoku Air Strike in Taipei in the name of the First Brigade of the Republic of China Air Force. on December 9, 1941, the National Government of the Republic of China officially declared war on Japan and declared all treaties against Japan null and void. On November 25, 1943, the 14th Air Force of the United States Army Air Forces in China and the First Brigade of the Chinese-American Composite Wing launched 14 B-25 bombers from Suichuan, Jiangxi Province, China, and bombed the Japanese air base at Hsinchu, destroying 52 Japanese planes, In July 1945, China, Britain and the U.S. issued the Potsdam Declaration, which made it clear that "the terms of the Cairo Declaration must be implemented" as one of the necessary conditions for Japan's surrender. on September 2, Japan formally accepted the terms of the Potsdam Proclamation and surrendered to the Allies.

=== The Republic of China takes over Taiwan ===
On August 29, 1945, Chiang Kai-shek. appointed Chen Yi, then chairman of Fujian Province, as the chief executive of Taiwan Province, and on October 15, Kuomintang troops disembarked at Keelung Harbor, and on October 25, the Republic of China formally took over Taiwan and Penghu, designating that day as Taiwan's Retrocession Day. At the end of February 1947, there was a series of civil-military conflicts in Taiwan, and Chen Yi secretly requested Chiang Chung Cheng to send more troops from mainland China to suppress them.

From 1948 onward, as the Republic of China Armed Forces lost successive battles in the Civil War, Chiang began to relocate the National Government, military units, military dependents, National Palace relics, treasury assets and related archives to Taiwan. from 1945 to 1950, nearly two million military and civilians from all over mainland China moved to Taiwan. (Note: The 1944 census conducted by the Taiwan Governor's Office showed that the population of Taiwan and Penghu was only 6.27 million.) These mainland immigrants were called waishengren in Taiwan to distinguish them from the earlier immigrants to Taiwan from the province.

== The present age ==
=== Military confrontation ===
Top leaders of both sides of the Nationalist and Communist civil wars

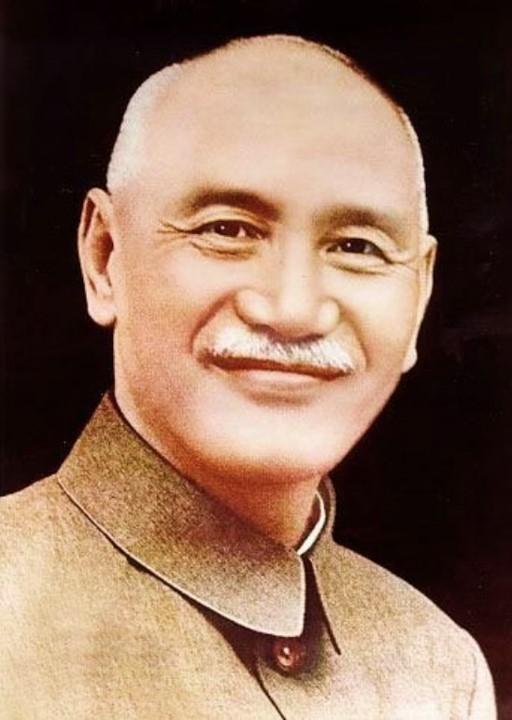
President of Kuomintang, China Chiang Kai-shek

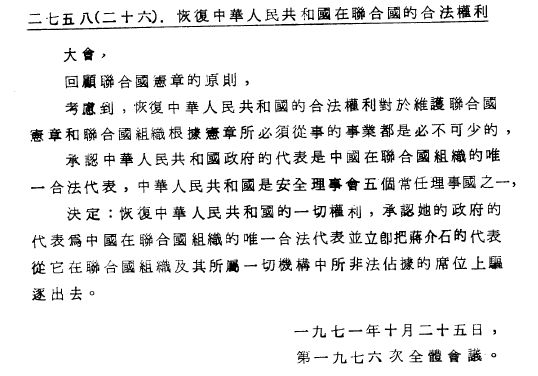
United Nations General Assembly Resolution 2758 of 1971

From 1928 to 1942, the Chinese Communist Party (CCP) maintained that Taiwan was a separate nation. In a 1937 interview with Edgar Snow, Mao Zedong stated "we will extend them (the Koreans) our enthusiastic help in their struggle for independence. The same thing applies for Taiwan."

On March 15, 1949, the Xinhua News Agency published an editorial titled "The Chinese People Must Liberate Taiwan", raising the slogan of "Chinese unification" for the first time. After the government of the Republic of China moved to Taipei following the defeat of the Chinese Communist Revolution, it put forward slogans such as "counter-attacking the mainland", "eliminating communist bandits", and "rescuing compatriots", and promulgated the "Ordinance on the Suppression of Bandits and Spies during the Counterinsurgency Period", which strictly restricted the interaction between Taiwanese and mainlanders. After the founding of the People's Republic of China, the two sides of the Taiwan Strait went through the Battle of Gulingtou in 1949, the Battle of Dongshan Island in 1953, the First Taiwan Strait Crisis in 1954, the Battle of Yijiangshan Islands in January 1955, the Battle of Dachen Archipelago in February 1955, and the Second Taiwan Strait Crisis in 1958, with both sides winning and losing.

During that time, the Korean War broke out and U.S. troops moved into Taiwan, while noting that Taiwan's status was undetermined. As a result, the People's Republic of China complained to the United Nations Security Council Resolution 87 about the armed aggression against Taiwan, while protesting the exclusion of the People's Republic of China from the United Nations, but the case was eventually rejected. In the Treaty of San Francisco, Japan renounced all rights, rights names and claims to Taiwan and the Penghu Islands, but neither the ROC nor the People's Republic of China participated in the signing of the peace treaty. The ROC and Japan then signed the Treaty of Taipei in 1952, and the signing of the Sino-American Mutual Defense Treaty also made the PLA wary. in April 1955, Zhou Enlai, Premier of the State Council and Ministry of Foreign Affairs of the People's Republic of China, went to Indonesia to attend the Bandung Conference and issued a statement that "the Chinese government is willing to negotiate with the U.S. government to strive for the liberation of Taiwan by peaceful means". After learning of this in the U.S., Li Zongren responded by publishing "Proposals on the Taiwan Question" in August of the same year, (Note: In 1949, the acting president of the Republic of China, Li Zongren, was not evacuated to Taiwan, but went to the United States via Hong Kong. he was impeached in 1954.) while the ROC government blocked the news of the publication of this article.

In early October 1958, the PLA announced that it would give up its blockade of Kinmen, and later changed to a "single strike and no strike" to gradually reduce its offensive, and the cross-strait wrestling turned to a legal-unification dispute over Greater China's representation in the international community. In 1972 Nixon visited China and signed the Three Communiqués, and in September of the same year China and Japan established diplomatic relations; on January 1, 1979, the U.S. established diplomatic relations with the People's Republic of China, while breaking diplomatic relations with the ROC, replacing the U.S.-China Mutual Defense Treaty with the Taiwan Relations Act, and withdrawing troops from Taiwan. On January 1, 1979, Xu Xiangqian, Ministry of National Defense, issued the "Statement of the Ministry of National Defense on the Cessation of Artillery Fire on the Greater Kinmen Islands", which officially put an end to the 21-year Kinmen artillery war.

=== De-escalating communication ===
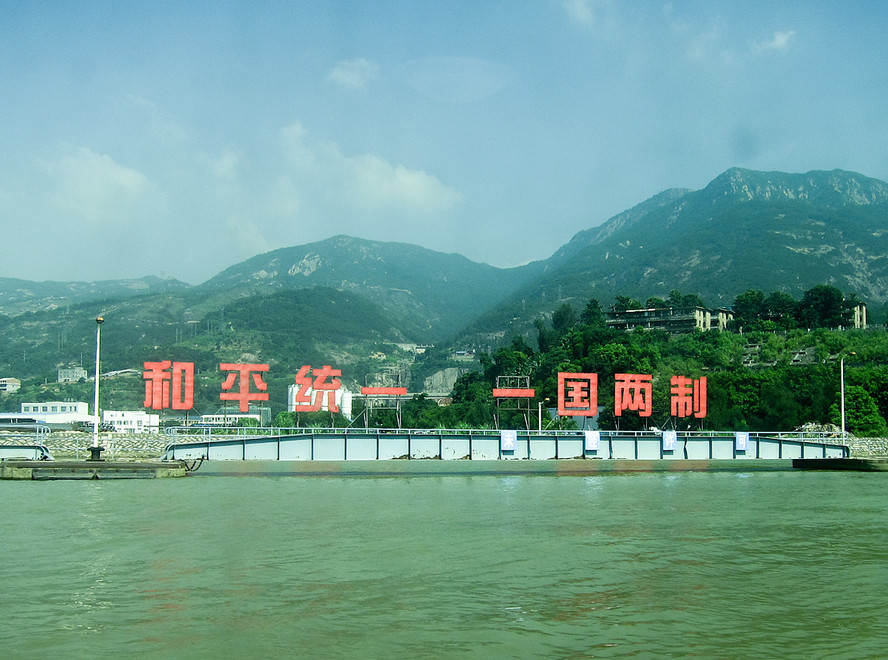
The "Peaceful Reunification, One Country, Two Systems" banner on the coast of Fuzhou's Mawei district looks out over the Matsu Islands.

On January 1, 1979, the Standing Committee of the National People's Congress issued the "Letter to Taiwan Compatriots", replacing the original "liberation of Taiwan" with "peaceful reunification and "one country, two systems", and moving from a hard-line to a more moderate attitude toward Taiwan. In response, Chiang Ching-kuo proposed the Three Noes "no contact, no negotiation, no compromise" policy on April 4, and on May 29, the Taiwan Strait resumed navigation. On October 1, 1981, Ye Jianying, Chairman of the Standing Committee of the National People's Congress of the People's Republic of China, proposed nine policies for the "peaceful reunification" of Taiwan, stating that "after the country is reunified, Taiwan can be a special administrative region with a high degree of autonomy and can retain its military forces. The central government (meaning Beijing) will not interfere in Taiwan's local affairs." On July 24, 1982, Liao Chengzhi, Minister of the United Front Work Department of the Central Committee of the Chinese Communist Party, sent a letter to President Chiang Ching-kuo, calling for peace talks between the two sides of the Taiwan Strait to "put away grudges when they meet"; the ROC government did not respond, and in 1984, the mainland refrained from returning fire when it shelled Jiao-Yu Island, which was under PLA control.

On November 2 of the same year, Taiwan opened up for people to visit their relatives on the mainland, and cross-strait private economic and trade activities heated up rapidly. in August 1988, the Mainland Working Committee of the Executive Yuan of the Republic of China was established to coordinate cross-strait economic and trade exchanges. in June 1989, the Taiwan region officially opened up for indirect imports of goods from the mainland. On October 7, 1990, the then President of the Republic of China, Lee Teng-hui, announced the establishment of the National Unification Council, and on February 23, 1991, the Guidelines for National Unification were adopted, advocating the unification of China based on the principles of "democracy, freedom, and equal wealth". An amendment to the Constitution divided the Republic of China into a "mainland area" and a "free area". The "Mainland Region" is defined in the Cross-Strait Act as "the territory of the Republic of China outside of Taiwan".

In 1991, the Taiwan Straits Exchange Foundation and the Association for Relations Across the Taiwan Straits became operational one after another, and talks were held in Hong Kong in 1992, but to no avail. In April 1993, the cross-strait Wang–Koo summit was held on the basis of the 1992 Consensus. In January 1995, Jiang Zemin, then the General Secretary of the Chinese Communist Party, put forward eight propositions for developing cross-strait relations and advancing Chinese unification. In response, President Lee Teng-hui put forward six proposals on April 8, known as Lee's six articles.

=== Conscious opposition ===
National Communist Party breaks ice to exchange top leaders from both sides

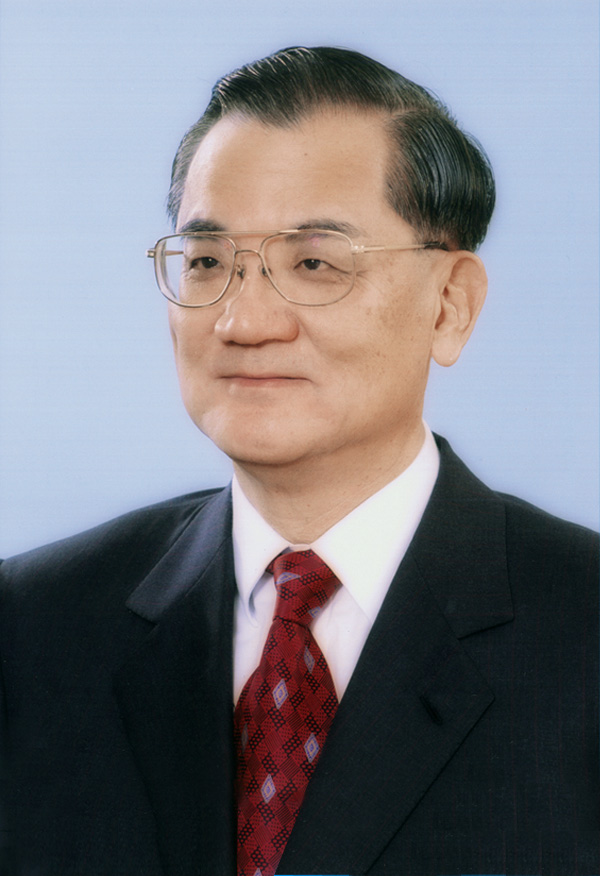
Chairman of the Kuomintang of China Lien Chan

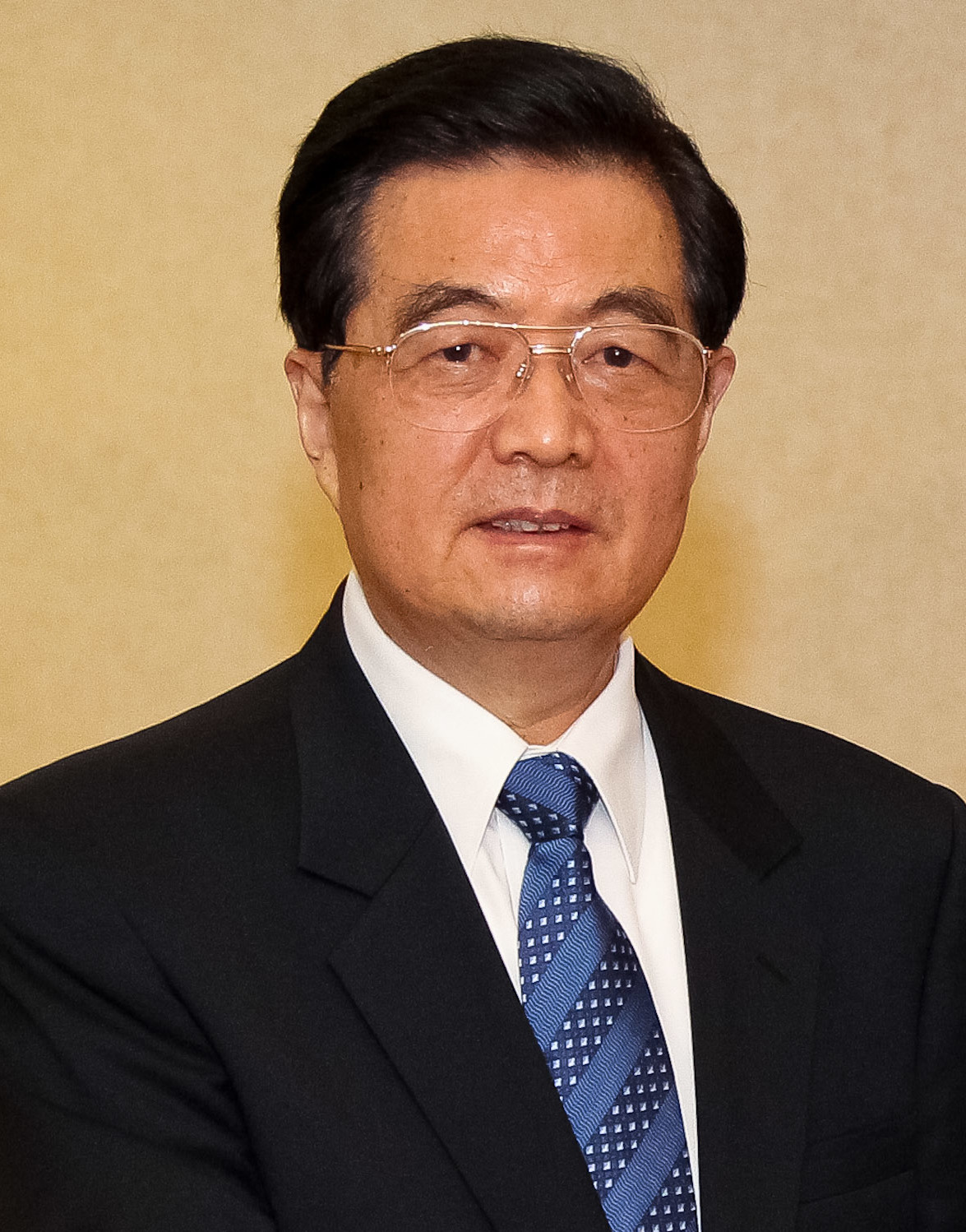
General Secretary of the Chinese Communist Party Hu Jintao

The Min Ping Yu No. 5540 incident in 1990 and the Qiandao Lake incident and the Xiaojinmen anti-aircraft artillery misfire on Xiamen in 1994 triggered discontent among people on both sides of the Taiwan Strait. in June 1995, then ROC President Lee Teng-hui visited Cornell University in his private capacity and proposed the national positioning of the Republic of China on Taiwan, triggering the Third Taiwan Strait Crisis. In August 1996, China opened the Fuzhou and Xiamen. On September 14, 1996, Lee proposed the idea of "using patience and urgency" at the Taiwan Businessmen's Conference, restricting the Taiwanese business community's investment in mainland China. In 1997, Fujian established the "Cross-Strait (Fuzhou) Agricultural Cooperation Pilot Zone" and the "Cross-Strait (Zhangzhou) Agricultural Cooperation Pilot Zone", and in May 1999, the Democratic Progressive Party Plenum passed the "Resolution on Taiwan's Future". In July of the same year, President Lee Teng-hui put forward the two-state theory, advocating that the relationship between Taiwan and mainland China was "state-to-state" or "at least a special state-to-state relationship".

The flag of the World Taiwan Congress is widely used in Taiwan independence activities.

In 2000, when the Democratic Progressive Party became the ruling party of the Republic of China (ROC) for the first time, Chen Shui-bian proposed Four Noes and One Without at his inauguration ceremony, namely, "As long as the Chinese Communist Party has no intention to use force against Taiwan, I promise that during my term of office, I will not declare independence, I will not change the national symbol, I will not promote the constitutionalization of the two-state theory, I will not promote a referendum on unification and independence that would change the status quo, and there is no question of abolishing the national platform and the National Unification Council. In 2001, Matsu Islands, Kinmen, Mawei District, and Xiamen were connected to each other by trade, air, and mail. On August 2, 2002, Chen proposed "One

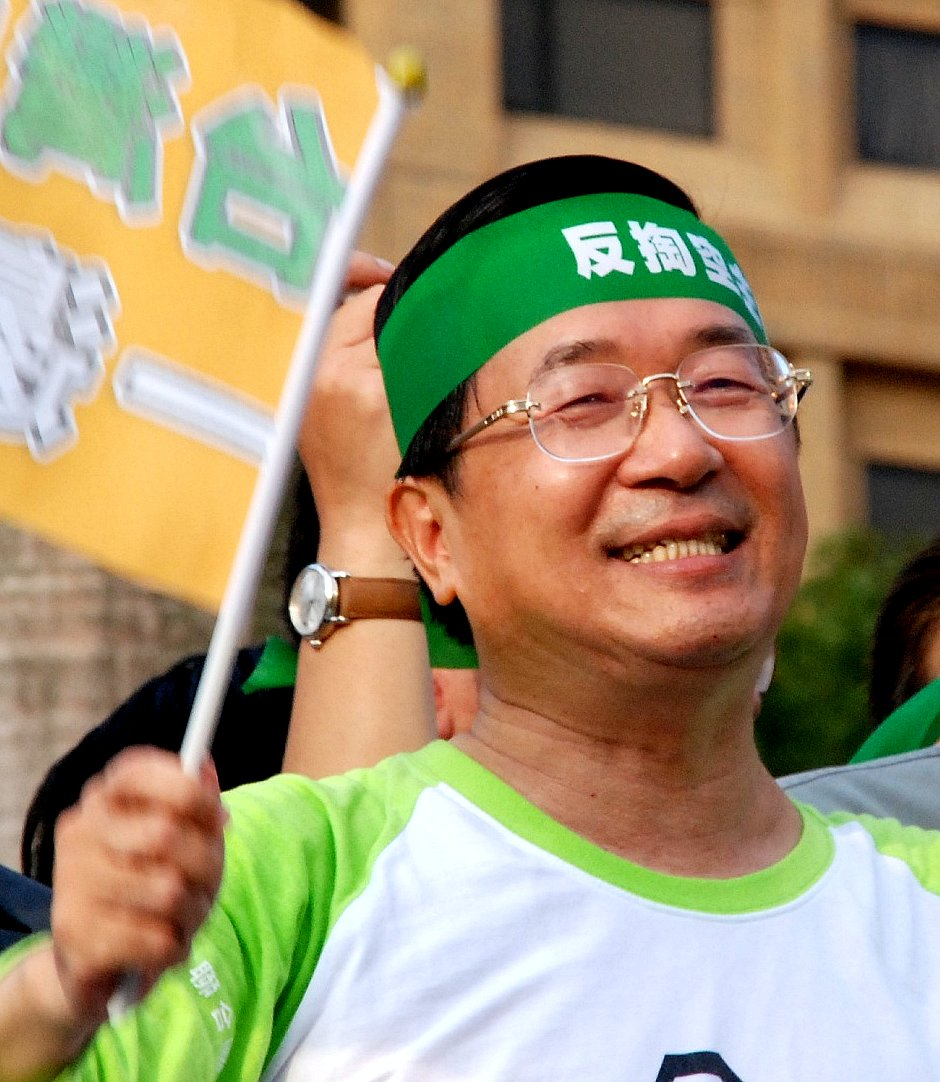
Former President of the Republic of China Chen Shui-bian holds the banner of "Taiwan, China, One Country" in a rally on Oct. 25, 2008.

Country on Each Side" through a video conference at the World Taiwan Clansmen's Association, saying that Taiwan and China are not the same countries. On February 22, 2004, Chen said that

the mainland was aiming 496 missiles at Taiwan, with an additional one every six days. As a result, Taiwan held the 228 Million Hands for Taiwan campaign to oppose the deployment of China's missile facilities against Taiwan.

In March 2005, President Chen Shui-bian told members of the European Parliament and the news media that he could not change the ROC's national name to the Republic of Taiwan. On March 26, the Democratic Progressive Party (DPP) and the Taiwan Federation of Trade Unions (TUF) organized a march in protest. On August 2, 2005, Chen proposed a four-stage theory, namely "the ROC is on the mainland, the ROC is in Taiwan." Four days later, Chen proposed one principle, three insistencies and five objections as the guidelines for handling cross-strait affairs, and in 2006 Chen announced that the "National Unification Plan" would "cease to apply". There is no left-right route in Taiwan, only the issue of unification and independence. However, this did not cause a strong reaction from China and the U.S., and cross-strait economic and trade exchanges continued to develop. 974,000 passengers were carried on the "Little Three Links" in 2008.

=== Reciprocal consultation ===
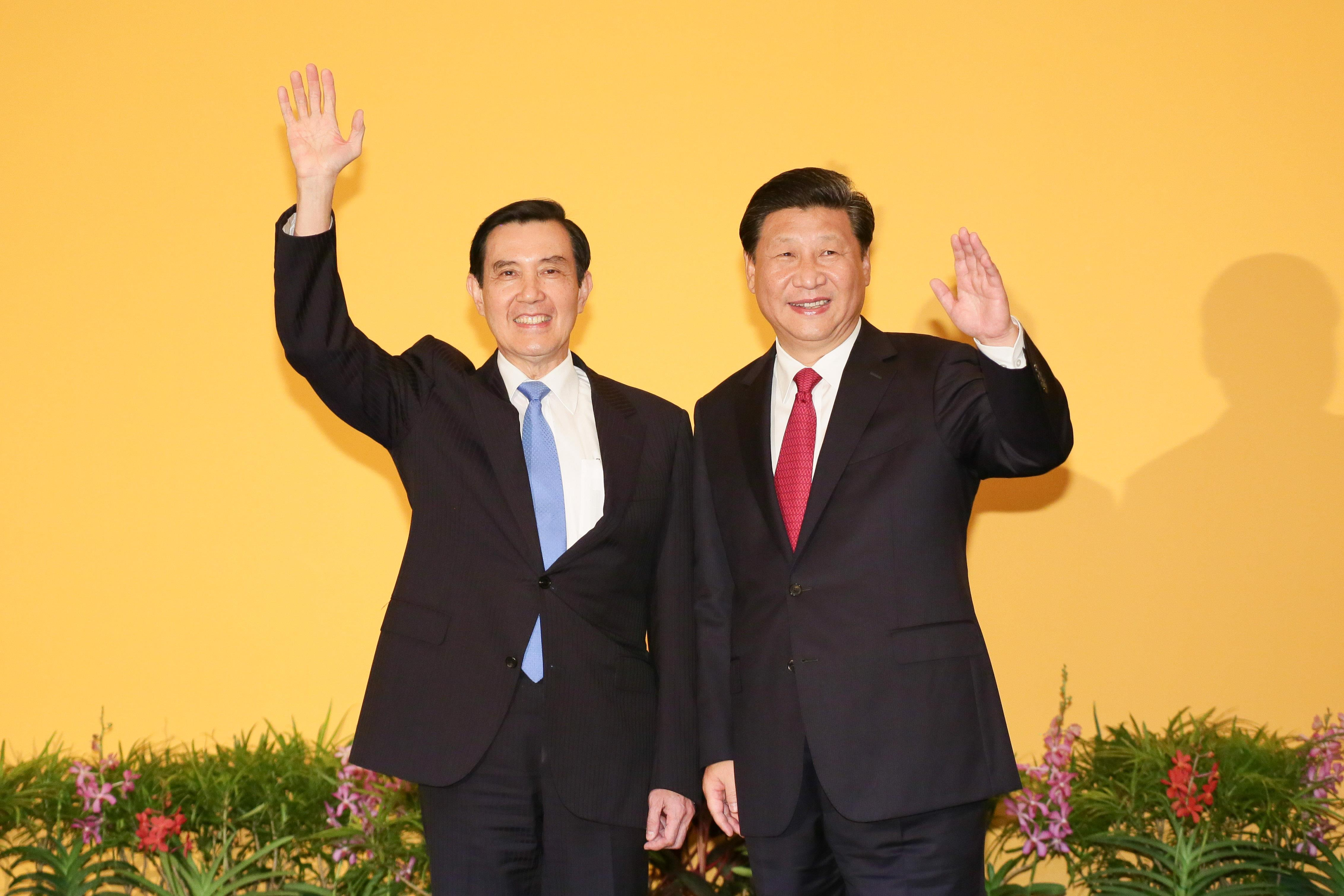
Cross-strait leaders meet in Singapore on November 7, 2015. First Ma–Xi meeting

On March 22, 2008, Ma Ying-jeou won the 2008 Taiwanese presidential election, and on May 20, the Chinese Kuomintang returned to power, advocating no unification, no independence, and no military force, that is, "during Ma's term of office, he pledged not to promote cross-strait unification, nor to declare Taiwan's independence, and no military war between the two sides of the Taiwan Strait. In October and November of the same year, Association for Relations Across the Taiwan Straits (ARATS) Vice President Zhang Mingqing and President Chen Yunlin, who had served as Director and Assistant Director of the Taiwan Affairs Office, visited Taiwan and were attacked and besieged by protesting people in Taiwan. On December 31 of the same year, Hu Jintao, General Secretary of the CCP, put forward the "Hu Six Points" at the 30th anniversary of the publication of the "Letter to Taiwan Compatriots". Cross-strait relations have continued to develop on the basis of the "1992 Consensus", and the SEF and the Association for Relations Across the Taiwan Strait (ARATS) have held eleven "leaders' meetings" and signed twenty-three agreements and two joint statements, including the Cross-Straits Economic Cooperation Framework Agreement (ECFA), the launch of regular cross-strait direct flights, and cross-strait cooperation in combating crime. In 2013, the first time the Mainland Affairs Council was allowed to participate in APEC Indonesia 2013 meetings was considered a major breakthrough in the progress of cross-strait relations.

The Sunflower school movement in Taiwan in 2014 curbed the momentum of cross-strait economic integration. In June of the same year, DPP's Tainan Mayor Lai Ching-te said during a visit to mainland China that "the future of Taiwan is to be decided by the 23 million people together". The Taiwan Affairs Office responded that "any issue involving China's sovereignty and territorial integrity must be decided by the entire Chinese people, including Taiwan compatriots," and stressed that its stance against Taiwan's independence would remain unchanged. In September, the Taiwan Affairs Office of the Central Committee of the CCP invited more than 20 Taiwan unificationist groups to visit Beijing, and the General Secretary of the CCP Central Committee, Xi Jinping, reiterated that "peaceful unification and one country, two systems" is the basic policy of the mainland in resolving the Taiwan issue. In response, Executive Yuan President Jiang Yi-huah said, "The Republic of China has never accepted the policy of one country, two systems, and our proposition is to maintain the status quo under the constitutional framework of the Republic of China. For its part, mainland China continues to roll out new unification strategies. (Note: The People's Republic of China is under one-party rule by the Chinese Communist Party, with the CCP General Secretary and Chairman of the Central Military Commission as the paramount leader. The Republic of China currently has a semi-presidential system with direct election, and the President of the Republic of China is the head of state and the commander-in-chief of the three armies, and is the supreme leader.) On November 7, 2015, top cross-strait leaders Xi Jinping and Ma Ying-jeou met in Singapore, the first meeting of top leaders from both sides of the Taiwan Strait in the 66 years since the political separation in 1949, and the two sides exchanged views on advancing the peaceful development of cross-strait relations. DPP Chairman and presidential candidate Tsai Ing-wen criticized the meeting as "an attempt to use a political framework to limit the future choices of the people in cross-strait relations".

=== Current status of the Taiwan Strait ===
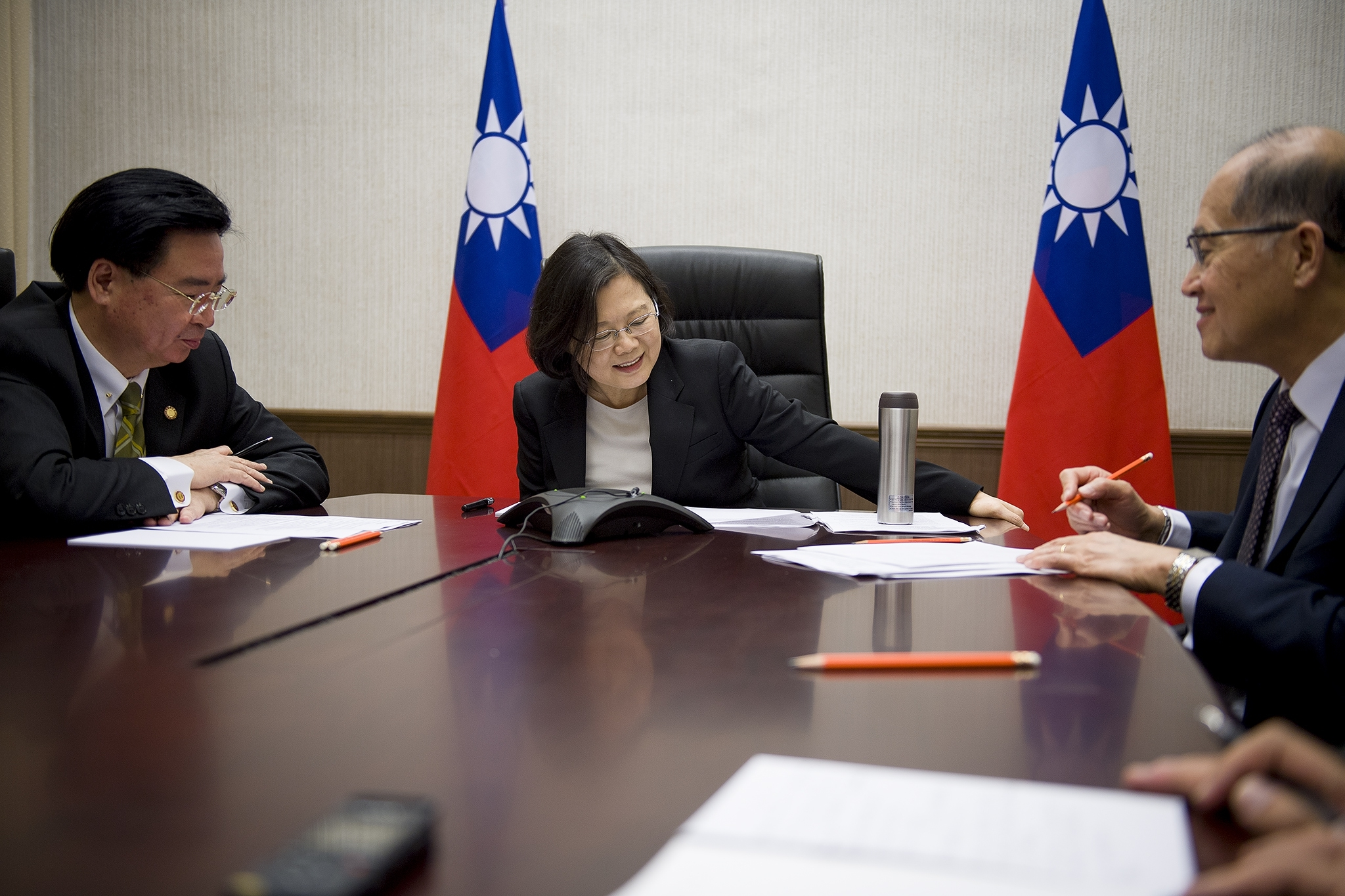
The December 2, 2016, Trump-Tsai call had been considered a diplomatic breakthrough for Taiwan

Since her inauguration as president of the Republic of China on May 20, 2016, Tsai Ing-wen, a member of the Democratic Progressive Party, has advocated maintaining the status quo and not recognizing the 1992 Consensus, and successfully made a phone call with U.S. President-elect Donald Trump in late 2016. The Xi Jinping–Li Keqiang Administration has continuously pressured the Presidency of Tsai Ing-wen in the hope that Tsai would return to the 1992 Consensus. For her part, in an open letter to members of the Democratic Progressive Party (DPP) as party chairman on the occasion of the party's 30th anniversary, Tsai said she would resist pressure from mainland China, develop relations with other countries, and get rid of her overdependence on China. Most Taiwanese people are dissatisfied with the suppression of mainland China in the international community, while on the other hand half of the public is dissatisfied with Tsai's performance in handling cross-strait relations.

Xi Jinping, General Secretary of the Chinese Communist Party, delivered the "Xi Five Articles" at the Great Hall of the People in Beijing during the "40th Anniversary Commemorative Meeting of the Letter to Taiwan Compatriots" on Jan. 2, 2019. Focusing on the Political status of Taiwan, Xi reiterated "the 1992 Consensus that both sides of the Strait belong to the same China and work together for national reunification". In the afternoon of the same day, Tsai Ing-wen, President of the Republic of China held an impromptu press conference, saying that she "rejects the 1992 Consensus" and "resolutely opposes one country, two systems". Since March 2019, the People's Liberation Army has continuously conducted drills in the Taiwan Strait. On April 30, 2021, R.O.C. Foreign Ministry spokesman Ou Jiang'an said that China's actions had jeopardized the security and status quo in the Taiwan Strait, and on May 12, 2021, Taiwan Affairs Office spokesman Zhu Fenglian said that "Taiwan independence" stubborn elements who malign the mainland and incite cross-strait confrontation will be severely punished and held accountable for life under the law. .... On November 5 of the same year, the Taiwan Affairs Office named Taiwan's Foreign Minister Joseph Wu, Legislative President You You Si-kun and Executive President Su Tseng-chang as "Taiwan independence stubborn elements. In response, Wu said it was an honor, while Yau felt honored and thanked him, and Su said he was not intimidated.

On August 2, 2022, Speaker of the United States House of Representatives Nancy Pelosi visited Taiwan and the PLA immediately conducted a series of military exercises around Taiwan, firing several ballistic missiles. On August 10, 2022, the Taiwan Affairs Office and the State Council Information Office jointly released the third White Paper on Taiwan, "The Taiwan Question and China's Reunification in the New Era" referring to the "One Country, Two Systems Taiwan Program" and the "Taiwan Special Administrative Region. On August 16, 2022, the Taiwan Affairs Office added Hsiao Bi-khimn, Gu Li-hsiung, Tsai Chi-chang, Ko Chien-ming, Lin Fei-fan, Chen Chiu-hwa, and Wang Dingyu to the list of recalcitrant Taiwan independence activists for sanctions.

On April 7, 2023, Zhu Fenglian, spokesperson for the Taiwan Affairs Office, said that the Vision Foundation and the Asian League for Freedom and Democracy have been peddling Taiwan independence ideas internationally and creating incidents that violate the One China principle, such as "one China, one Taiwan" and "two Chinas". The mainland side decided to ban the heads of the Vision Foundation and the Asian League for Freedom and Democracy from entering the mainland and Hong Kong and Macao Special Administrative Regions, and to ban relevant mainland organizations and individuals from cooperating with them.

== See also ==
- Foreign relations of imperial China
- Second United Front
- Fujian–Taiwan relationship
- Cross-strait relations
