= Luoxing Subdistrict, Fuzhou =

Luoxing Subdistrict 罗星街道
- Subdistrict
- Location within Fujian Location within China
- Coordinates: 25°59′17″N 119°27′28″E
- Country: People's Republic of China
- Province: Fujian
- Prefecture-level city: Fuzhou
- District: Mawei District

Population (2010)
  - Total: 60,117
- Time zone: UTC+8 (China Standard)

Luoxing Subdistrict (simplified Chinese: 罗星街道; traditional Chinese: 羅星街道; pinyin: Luóxīng Jiēdào) is a subdistrict of Mawei District, Fuzhou, Fujian, China. The subdistrict had a population of 60,117 as of 2010.

== History ==
In February 1978, Mawei Town (Chinese: 马尾镇) was established, and was upgraded to a subdistrict (Chinese: 街道) in August 1982.

On December 15, 1995, Mawei Subdistrict was renamed to Luoxing Subdistrict.

== Administrative divisions ==
Luoxing Subdistrict is divided into five residential communities and five administrative villages.

The subdistrict's five residential communities are Yanshan (Chinese: 沿山社区), Maxian (Chinese: 马限社区), Luoxing (Chinese: 罗星社区), Xingang (Chinese: 新港社区), and Peiying (Chinese: 培英社区).

The subdistrict's five administrative villages are Shangqi (Chinese: 上岐村), Qingzhou (Chinese: 青洲村), Junzhu (Chinese: 君竹村), Shuangfeng (Chinese: 双峰村), and Luoxing (Chinese: 罗星村).

== Demographics ==
The subdistrict had a population of 60,117 as of 2010, slightly down from its 60,446 as of 2000.

== See also ==
- List of township-level divisions of Fujian
