= Guo Baofeng =

Chinese blogger

Guo Baofeng (simplified Chinese: 郭宝峰; traditional Chinese: 郭寶峰; pinyin: Guō Bǎofēng) is a Chinese blogger from the city of Mawei, Fujian, China. Around July 16, 2009, after posting information about an alleged rape and murder by local officials of a young woman, he was arrested. He managed to Tweet a plea for help before his phone was confiscated, which led to a viral spread of information about his arrest and the case he was investigating. All relevant information became quickly subject to censorship in China, but were disseminated on the international Internet. Local Chinese activists organized a postcard campaign, and gather funds for his defense. Eventually after 16 days Guo and two other bloggers arrested in the same investigation were released. Guo credited his release to the widespread online interest and activism related to his case.
