= Ta-Chia-hsi revolt =

Chinese revolt in 1731–1732

The Ta Chia-Hsi Revolt (Chinese: 大甲西社抗清事件; also Taikasei revolt) of 1731-32 was a major aboriginal revolt on Formosa, which saw the Taokas tribe take up arms against the Qing authorities following a series of issues with the corvee labor policy. The Taokas swept southward and were joined by other plains aboriginal groups, stopping to lay siege to the walled city of Changhua. The revolt ended following the Qing enlisting the help of the An-li tribe and Green Standard troops from the south.

Davidson (1903) The Island of Formosa, Past and Present. https://archive.org/details/islandofformosap00davi
