= Yizhou (island) =

Yizhou (Chinese: 夷洲) is the name of an island, debated to be variously identified as Taiwan and the Ryukyu Islands, described in the account of an expedition undertaken by the Eastern Wu dynasty of China in AD 230. 90 percent of the sailors died on the voyage but the survivors still managed to kidnap "several thousand" natives, probably Taiwanese aborigines.
