= Mawei, Fuzhou =

Mawei 马尾区 Mamoi
- District
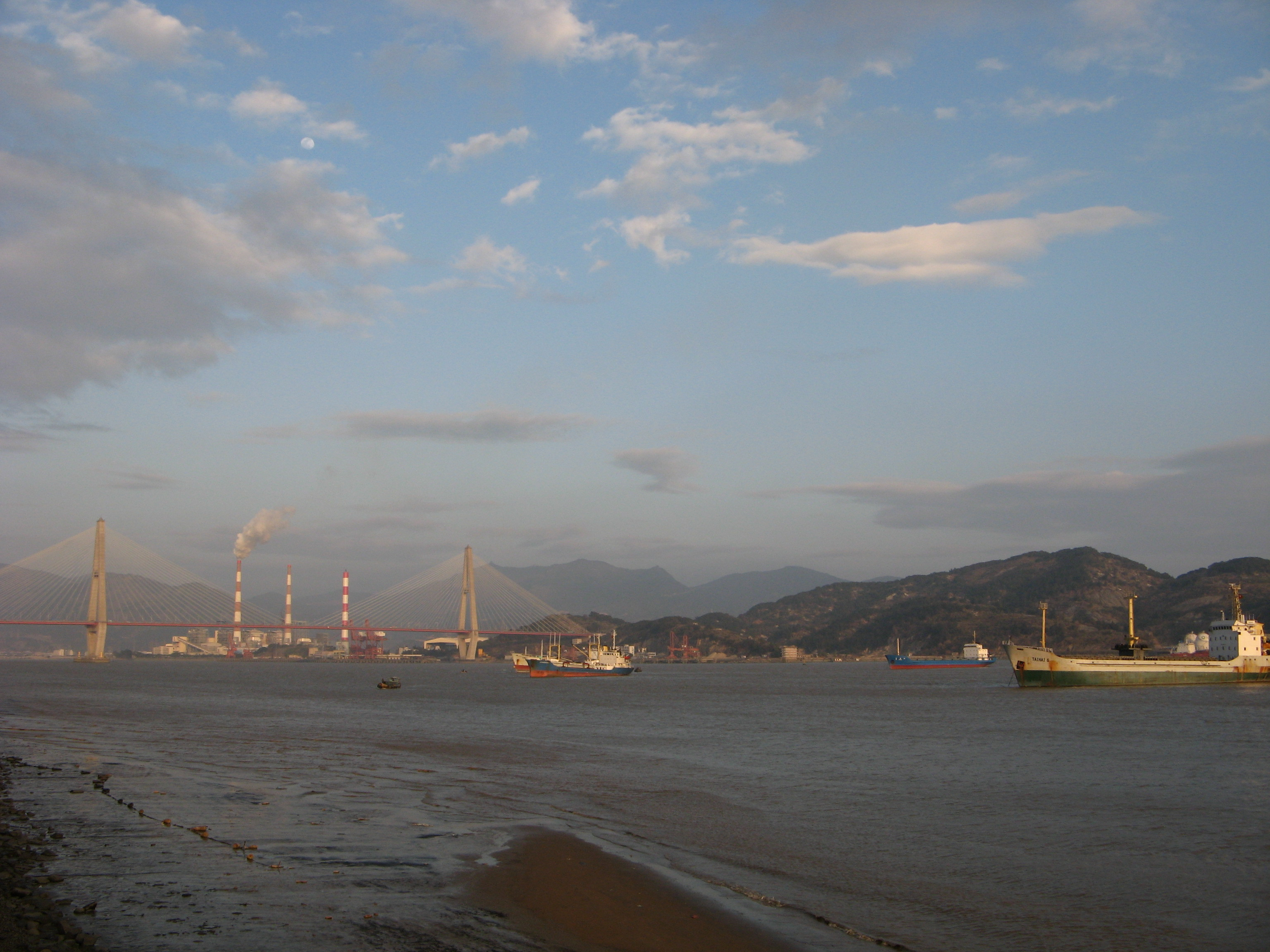
- Qingzhou Bridge spans the Min River, connecting Mawei District with Changle District

- Location in Fujian
- Coordinates: 26°00′41″N 119°27′25″E
- Country: People's Republic of China
- Province: Fujian
- Prefecture-level city: Fuzhou

Area
  - Total: 319.66 km^{2} (123.42 sq mi)
  - Land: 275.66 km^{2} (106.43 sq mi)
  - Water: 44 km^{2} (17 sq mi)

Population (2020)
  - Total: 290,554
  - Density: 1,054.0/km^{2} (2,729.9/sq mi)
- Time zone: UTC+8 (China Standard)

Mawei (simplified Chinese: 马尾; traditional Chinese: 馬尾; pinyin: Mǎwěi; BUC: Mā-muōi) is one of 6 urban districts of the prefecture-level city of Fuzhou, the capital of Fujian Province, China. The district spans an area of 319.66 square kilometers, of which, 275.66 square kilometers is land. The district had a population of 290,554 as of 2020.

Mawei District is located on the north bank of the Min River, between Fuzhou's urban core and the coast of the East China Sea. The district also includes Langqi Island formed by the two main branches of the Min River as it flows into the sea.

Mawei District is famous for its historical Mawei Arsenal, with a modern shipyard operating on the site.

== Toponymy ==
The district is named after the nearby Mawei River (Chinese: 马尾江).

== History ==
While serving as the Viceroy of Min-Zhe, Zuo Zongtang established the Fujian Shipping Academy in 1866. The academy subsequently constructed the Mawei Arsenal, and ran a naval education program which incorporated western-style education and shipbuilding.

In 1913, the area was organized as Majiang Town (Chinese: 马江镇). Majiang Town was renamed to Mawei Town (Chinese: 马尾镇) in 1951. In 1956, Mawei Town was re-organized as Mawei District (Chinese: 马尾区), but was re-organized once again in 1958 as the Mawei People's Commune (Chinese: 马尾人民公社). Mawei District was re-established in March 1960, and lasted until 1969, when it was re-organized as the Mawei People's Commune.

In August 1982, Mawei was re-organized as a district, which it remains as today. On December 15, 1995, the district underwent boundary changes.

== Geography ==
The district sits on the northern bank of the Min River, and lies approximately 17 nautical miles from its mouth. It is bordered by the Min River to the east, Jin'an District to the west, Cangshan District and Changle District on the other side of the Min River to its south, and Lianjiang County to its north. Qingzhou Bridge spans the river, connecting Mawei's main urban center with Changle District.

46.89% of the district is forested. The district is also home to the Minjiang Estuary Wetlands, a provincial nature reserve spanning 869 hectares. The district also contains eight islands, one of which is inhabited.

== Administrative divisions ==
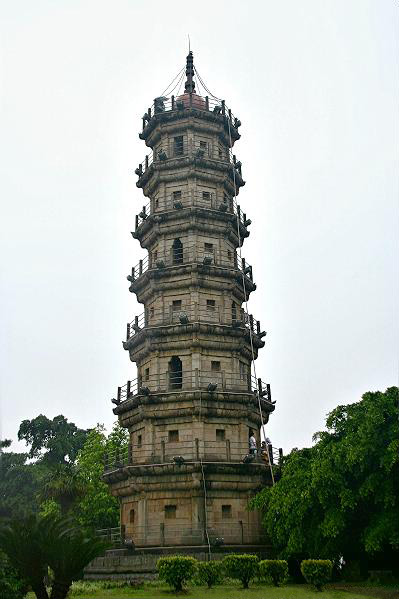
Luoxing Pagoda

The district is divided into one subdistrict and three towns.

Mawei District's sole subdistrict is Luoxing Subdistrict.

Mawei District's three towns are Mawei, Tingjiang, and Langqi.

== Demographics ==
As of 2010, the district's population was 231,929, up from 203,527 in 2000. In 1996, the district had a population of about 145,000.

In 2018, the district experienced a rate of natural decrease of 6.39 per 1,000, and experienced a net migration rate of 12.72 per 1,000.

== Economy ==
As of 2018, the district's GDP totaled ¥53.66 billion. The average disposable income of urban residents totaled ¥48,538, and the average disposable income of rural residents totaled ¥25,005. Total retail sales in the district in 2018 totaled ¥19.5 billion, the district exported ¥19.2 billion of goods the same year.

The district is home to four mines, and has deposits of various stones and metals.

== Transport ==
The G15 Shenyang–Haikou Expressway and National Highway 104 both run through the district. The district is served by the Fuzhou-Mawei Railway. Mawei Port is located in the district.

== Notable sights ==
- Zhaozhang Temple
- Luoxing Pagoda
- Mawei Shipyard Clock Tower
- Tomb of Boqian

== Notable people ==
- Guo Baofeng, Chinese blogger
