= Two sides of the Taiwan Strait are not subordinate to each other =

Characterization of cross-strait relations

- Traditional Chinese: 海峽兩岸互不隸屬
- Simplified Chinese: 海峡两岸互不隶属
Transcriptions
Standard Mandarin
- Hanyu Pinyin: Hǎixiá liǎng'àn hù bù lìshǔ

The Republic of China and the People's Republic of China are not subordinate to each other
- Traditional Chinese: 中華民國與中華人民共和國互不隸屬
- Simplified Chinese: 中华民国与中华人民共和国互不隶属
Transcriptions
Standard Mandarin
- Hanyu Pinyin: Zhōnghuá Mínguó yǔ Zhōnghuá Rénmín Gònghéguó hù bù lìshǔ

The two sides of the Taiwan Strait are not subordinate to each other, also known as the Republic of China and the People's Republic of China are not subordinate to each other, is a policy positioning and political slogan of the Republic of China (Taiwan) government regarding the status quo of the Taiwan Strait and the cross-strait relationship. The term "not subordinate to each other" was used in the proposals such as "two Chinas in stages" and "one China under separate governance" put forward by the government of President Lee Teng-hui. The expression "the Republic of China and the People's Republic of China are not subordinate to each other" first appeared in the Resolution on Taiwan's Future passed by the Democratic Progressive Party (DPP) in 1999. It was then re-proposed by the government of President Tsai Ing-wen in 2021 and officially became the main axis of the ROC's cross-strait policy under the rule of the DPP. It was also largely adopted by the government of President Lai Ching-te that succeeded Tsai.

The gist of this argument is that the People's Republic of China (PRC), established in 1949, only ruled mainland China, and the Republic of China has only ruled Taiwan, Penghu, Kinmen and Matsu after 1949. It argues that each side has its own citizens and territory, so in reality there is no overlap or subordination of sovereignty. It maintains that the relationship between them is that they are two sovereign states that are not subordinate to each other. This argument involves constitutional concepts such as ROC nationality law. In 2023, the Tsai Ing-wen government announced that it would stop using the previous legal interpretation that "the people of mainland China are citizens of the Republic of China". When the ROC government stated that "the two countries are not subordinate to each other", it did not discuss whether its meaning was "two Chinas" or "one China, one Taiwan". As the first party to propose "the two countries are not subordinate to each other" in the Resolution on Taiwan's Future, the DPP also carried the tradition of the pro-Taiwan independence party platform. Therefore, it adopted a position that integrated the two. For example, Lai Ching-te has repeatedly proposed that "the two countries are not subordinate to each other" is the definition of pro-independence. Because there are still differences of opinion in Taiwan regarding Taiwan's national status, and there are legal disputes on issues such as whether the PRC can be recognized as an independent sovereign state and whether the mainland China region is still part of the ROC, there is no consensus in Taiwan's political circles on the version of the argument that "the two countries are not subordinate to each other". Opponents compare this argument to the "special state-to-state relations" (commonly known as the two-state theory) proposed by President Lee Teng-hui in 1999, calling it the "new two-state theory".

The People's Republic of China believes that the statement that "the two countries are not subordinate to each other" violates the historical and legal reality. The reasoning for criticizing this statement is basically the same as the criticism of Lee Teng-hui's "two-state theory" in 1999. According to his view, the People's Republic of China was established in October 1949, and the international community gradually recognized it as China's legitimate representative. This did not mean that the liberated areas were separated from China's territory, but rather that "the new regime replaced the old regime without any change in the subject of international law, and China's sovereignty and inherent territory were not changed as a result". Although the PRC believes "the two sides of the Taiwan Strait are in a special state of long-term political confrontation", it maintains that this does not mean that Taiwan can establish itself as a sovereign state in the name of the Republic of China, nor does it mean that the two sides of the Taiwan Strait have been divided into two sovereign states.

== History ==
The term "mutually independent" has been used as a political rhetoric by figures such as Lee Teng-hui, Lien Chan, Su Chi, Ma Ying-jeou, and Tsai Ing-wen, each imbuing it with different meanings. In the early years of Lee Teng-hui's administration, cross-strait relations were defined as "one China, two political entities" with "mutually independent" relationships, avoiding recognition of each other's national status and thus eliminating disputes over the division of national sovereignty. This proposition was inherited by the Kuomintang and further developed by the Ma Ying-jeou administration.

During the later years of Lee Teng-hui's administration, he proposed the concept of a "special state-to-state relationship." Around the same time, the Democratic Progressive Party passed the Resolution on Taiwan's Future, declaring that "Taiwan, while called the Republic of China according to the current constitution, is not subordinate to the People's Republic of China." In 2021, President Tsai Ing-wen issued "Four Principles," making "the Republic of China and the People's Republic of China not subordinate to each other" the core of her cross-strait policy, emphasizing that the Republic of China government possesses sovereignty and is not subject to interference from the People's Republic of China.

=== Early years of Lee Teng-hui's rule ===
In 1992, the National Unification Council passed the Definition of One China Resolution:

Our side believes that "One China" should refer to the Republic of China established in 1912, whose sovereignty extends to the whole of China, but whose current jurisdiction only extends to Taiwan, Penghu, Kinmen and Matsu. Taiwan is indeed a part of China, but the mainland is also a part of China... Since 1949, China has been in a state of temporary division, with two political entities governing the two sides of the Taiwan Strait. This is an objective fact, and any claim to unification cannot ignore the existence of this fact.

The case required that while advocating "One China" and the reunification of the two sides of the Taiwan Strait, the status quo of division and separate governance across the Strait must be respected, namely "one China, two political entities". In the same year, representatives of the Republic of China and the People's Republic of China held the 1992 Hong Kong Talks. The two sides did not reach a consensus on the specific connotation of "One China" and the specific methods for achieving Chinese reunification. They only exchanged letters after the meeting regarding the verbal statement that "both sides adhere to One China and seek reunification, but have different understandings of its political implications, which can be avoided in practical consultations," thus forming the 1992 Consensus. In 1993, the Asia-Pacific Economic Cooperation (APEC) held its first APEC Economic Leaders' Meeting in the United States. Jiang Zemin, the paramount leader of the PRC, stated to the international community that "One China" is the People's Republic of China, and Taiwan is a province of China and an inseparable part of the People's Republic of China's territory. In response, Chiang Pin-kung, the special envoy of the Republic of China, proposed a "phased approach of two Chinas with one China as the guiding principle." In 1994, the Mainland Affairs Council issued the "Explanation on Cross-Strait Relations", emphasizing that the Republic of China is a country with independent sovereignty, opposing the claim that the People's Republic of China has jurisdiction over Taiwan, and declaring that the two sides are equal political entities with separate jurisdictions. In 1995, in response to Jiang's Eight Points, President Lee Teng-hui issued a speech commonly known as Lee's Six Points, which introduced the term "not subordinate to each other".

Since 1949, Taiwan and the mainland have been governed by two separate political entities, resulting in a situation of division and separate governance across the Taiwan Strait, which in turn raises the question of national reunification. Therefore, to resolve the reunification issue, we must be realistic, respect history, and explore feasible ways to achieve national reunification within the context of the current separation. Only by objectively addressing this reality can both sides reach a greater consensus on the meaning of "One China" as soon as possible.

=== After the 1996 presidential election ===
In 1998, President Lee Teng-hui established the "Task Force for Strengthening the Sovereign State Status of the Republic of China," which organized scholars such as Hsu Tzong-li to propose a report that could define cross-strait relations as a "special state-to-state relationship". The report used the successive constitutional amendments to argue the legal basis for the Republic of China to be a sovereign state and suggested carrying out related legal projects such as constitutional amendments and law revisions.

Because intelligence indicated that Jiang Zemin, the paramount leader of the PRC, planned to announce to the international community on 1 October 1999, the 50th anniversary of the People's Republic of China, that when Wang Daohan visited Taiwan, the two sides of the Taiwan Strait would jointly promote the unification of China and launch political negotiations with the goal of "one country, two systems". The national security unit believed that this announcement would undermine the sovereign and independent status of the Republic of China in the international community. Lee Teng-hui decided to propose the "two-state theory" or "special state-to-state relations" in July of that year when he was interviewed by Deutsche Welle, in order to declare that Taiwan would not accept political negotiations for unification and to stop Jiang Zemin's plan. In an interview with Deutsche Welle, Lee Teng-hui stated:

The historical fact is that since the founding of the CCP in 1949, it has never ruled over Taiwan, Penghu, Kinmen, and Matsu, which were under the jurisdiction of the Republic of China. Since the constitutional amendment in 1991, cross-strait relations have been defined as relations between countries, or at least as relations between special countries, rather than as internal relations of "One China" involving a legitimate government, a rebel group, or a central government and a local government. Since its establishment in 1912, the Republic of China has always been a sovereign and independent country. After the constitutional amendment in 1991, cross-strait relations were positioned as a special state-to-state relationship, so there is no need to declare Taiwan's independence again.

The argument holds that after the founding of the People's Republic of China in 1949, the two sides of the Taiwan Strait were divided and governed separately. It holds that the Republic of China and the People's Republic of China are both sovereign independent countries, and the two sides of the Taiwan Strait are not subordinate to each other, just like the relationship between South Korea and North Korea, or between West Germany and East Germany. It holds that, due to historical and national sentiment factors, there is a special relationship between the two countries. This matter caused a strong backlash from mainland China, which launched a series of military exercises, leading to the Third Taiwan Strait Crisis.

=== Chen Shui-bian administration ===
In May 1999, the Democratic Progressive Party passed the Resolution on Taiwan's Future, which served as the party's platform for cross-strait discourse. It stated that the idea that Taiwan (Republic of China) "is not subordinate to the People's Republic of China" had become a "new social consensus."

Taiwan is a sovereign and independent country. Its sovereign territory extends only to Taiwan, Penghu, Kinmen, Matsu, and their affiliated islands, as well as its territorial sea and contiguous waters as defined by international law. Although Taiwan is currently referred to as the Republic of China under its constitution, it is not subordinate to the People's Republic of China. Any changes to the status quo regarding independence must be decided by a referendum of all residents of Taiwan.

In February 2000, the People's Republic of China issued The One-China Principle and the Taiwan Issue, outlining the conditions for the use of force against Taiwan. It stated that if a major event occurred in which "Taiwan was separated from China under any pretext," drastic measures would be taken. However, in the March 2000 presidential election, Chen Shui-bian, nominated by the DPP, was elected. After taking office in May, he made the Four Noes and One Without declaration, including "not promoting the inclusion of the two-state theory in the constitution," halting the process of legalizing this proposition. During this period, the ROC government's mainland policy mainly consisted of "future one China" and the Four Noes and One Without, while official statements still adopted the approach from the Lee Teng-hui era. However, during the campaign, the ROC government used the slogan "One country on each side", advocating that "Taiwan and the People's Republic of China are two different countries."

In 2003, when Ma Ying-jeou served as Vice Chairman of the Kuomintang, he stated that "the Republic of China is a sovereign and independent country, and the two sides of the Taiwan Strait are not subordinate to each other," a statement similar to that made by the Mainland Affairs Council during Lee Teng-hui's era.

=== Ma Ying-jeou administration ===
In 2008, Ma Ying-jeou was elected President of the Republic of China. He advocated "One China under the Constitution" within Taiwan, that is, the People's Republic of China is not an independent sovereign state, but the "mainland area" under the Constitution of the Republic of China, and belongs to one China with the Republic of China, not two countries. When dealing with the People's Republic of China, both sides set aside their differences on the specific connotation of "One China" based on the 1992 Consensus. The fact that the People's Republic of China is not an independent sovereign state is not explicitly stated.

Mainland Affairs Council Chairpersons Lai Shin-yuan and Andrew Hsia both proposed that "the two sides of the Taiwan Strait are not subordinate to each other, which is the political status quo". However, the above "the two sides of the Taiwan Strait are not subordinate to each other" refers to the separation and division of the free area and the mainland area in the Constitution of the Republic of China. However, the two separate entities belong to one China. According to this viewpoint, the Republic of China and the People's Republic of China are not two countries.

=== Tsai Ing-wen administration ===
In 2016, DPP Candidate Tsai Ing-wen was elected president. On 10 October 2021, in her National Day speech, he proposed the "Four Adherences" slogan for cross-strait policy, namely:

We must always uphold the free and democratic constitutional system, insist that the Republic of China and the People's Republic of China are not subordinate to each other, insist that sovereignty is inviolable and cannot be annexed, and insist that the future of the Republic of China (Taiwan) must follow the will of all the people of Taiwan.

For the first time, the "two countries are not subordinate to each other" mentioned in the Resolution on Taiwan's Future was used as the main axis of the Republic of China government's cross-strait discourse. In response, the PRC's Taiwan Affairs Office said that this was "selling the theory of two countries" and "seeking independence".

In May 2023, in response to the political turmoil surrounding a mainland man's national compensation case, the Executive Yuan issued a letter ordering the investigation and repeal of past legal interpretations that regarded people from mainland China as having Republic of China nationality, clarifying that from now on, the nationals of the Republic of China will only include two categories: people from Taiwan and people from Taiwan without household registration.

On 7 August 2023, Vice President Lai Ching-te reiterated in an interview that the two countries are not subordinate to each other, which he said was the meaning of "pragmatic Taiwan independence worker". On 30 December 2023, Lai Ching-te said in a televised debate during his presidential campaign that the definition of Taiwan independence is that the two countries are not subordinate to each other.

=== Lai Ching-te administration ===
On 20 May 2024, President Lai Ching-te further elaborated on this slogan in his inaugural address:

We all know that sovereignty is essential for a nation! According to the Constitution of the Republic of China, sovereignty belongs to all its citizens; those who hold Republic of China citizenship are citizens of the Republic of China; thus, it is clear that the Republic of China and the People's Republic of China are not subordinate to each other. Every individual must unite and cherish the nation; every political party must oppose annexation and safeguard sovereignty, and must not sacrifice national sovereignty for the sake of political power.

In June 2025, Lai Ching-te, in the first lecture of his "Ten Lectures on National Unity", argued for the independent sovereign state status of Taiwan, Penghu, Kinmen, and Matsu based on factors such as territory and people.

Taiwan, Penghu, Kinmen, and Matsu regularly elect their respective governments at all levels, exercise public power, conduct diplomacy, and possess defense capabilities. They are a political community comprised of the 23 million people on this land. Therefore, Taiwan is undoubtedly a country. …National sovereignty belongs to the 23 million people, because our sovereignty and governance reside in Taiwan, Penghu, Kinmen, and Matsu. Article 2 of the Constitution of the Republic of China explicitly states that "the sovereignty of the Republic of China belongs to all its citizens," and Article 3 states that "anyone holding the nationality of the Republic of China is a citizen of the Republic of China." In other words, one must possess a Republic of China identity card or passport to be considered a citizen of the Republic of China and to possess national sovereignty. Currently, approximately 23 million people in Taiwan, Penghu, Kinmen, and Matsu hold Republic of China nationality.

He further said that nearly 80% of the public agree that "the Republic of China and the People's Republic of China are not subordinate to each other."

Based on the policy stance that "the People’s Republic of China and the Republic of China are not subordinate to each other", the Lai Ching-te government changed its previous view that "special laws are superior to general laws" and prohibited mainland spouses who had entered Taiwan citizenship in accordance with the Act Governing Relations between the People of the Taiwan Area and the Mainland Area from participating in politics on the grounds that they "have not renounced the nationality of the People’s Republic of China", which led to the administrative lawsuit in the Shih Hsueh-yen case.

== Reactions ==
=== Taiwan ===
In a June 2024 interview, Ming Juzheng, an honorary professor of political science at National Taiwan University, said that the issue of positioning cross- strait relations is not just a legal issue, but more importantly a strategic consideration, to create greater strategic space for Taiwan in future cross-strait contact and negotiations. The "Republic of China and the People's Republic of China are not subordinate to each other" and the "special state-to-state relations" proposed in 1999 are both actions to widen the distance between the two sides and expand the strategic space for negotiations; while the Ma Ying-jeou government later easily returned to the framework of one China, its political ideology was commendable, but it was not wise from a strategic point of view.

Huang Nian, vice chairman of United Daily News, published a commentary in the newspaper in September 2024, arguing that "the two sides of the Taiwan Strait are not subordinate to each other" (referred to as "the theory of non-subordination" in the article) can be divided into "Route A" and "Route B": the former is the two-state theory route, which breaks away from the current norms of cross-strait relations under the laws such as the Constitution of the Republic of China and the Act Governing Relations between the People of the Taiwan Area and the Mainland Area, and promotes "the Republic of China and the People's Republic of China are not subordinate to each other" to "Taiwan and China are not subordinate to each other". This is the route that Lai Ching-te favors and believes that "this is the definition of Taiwan independence"; Route B is "one law and four insistences", which remains within the framework of "one China" in the Constitution of the Republic of China and is an alternative route of "one China, different interpretations". The commentary pointed out that once the "theory of non-subordination" is put forward, it is impossible to withdraw it. However, Route A will inevitably lead cross-strait relations to a dead end, while Route B has the possibility of "anchoring to the Republic of China / co-constructing peaceful competition and cooperation", so that cross-strait relations may still have a way out.

=== People's Republic of China ===
The People's Republic of China adheres to the one China principle, that is, since its establishment on 1 October 1949, the government of the People's Republic of China has replaced the government of the Republic of China and become the sole legal government representing the whole of China, including Taiwan. Since Lee Teng-hui proposed the special state-to-state relationship in 1999, the People's Republic of China has always strongly resisted and been hostile to such statements of "two countries" positioning. The People's Republic of China believes that the statement that "the two countries are not subordinate to each other" violates the historical and legal reality. The reasoning for criticizing this statement is basically the same as the criticism of Lee Teng-hui's "two-state theory" in 1999. According to his view, the People's Republic of China was established in October 1949, and the international community gradually recognized it as China's legitimate representative. This did not mean that the liberated areas were separated from China's territory, but rather that "the new regime replaced the old regime without any change in the subject of international law, and China's sovereignty and inherent territory were not changed as a result". Although the PRC believes "the two sides of the Taiwan Strait are in a special state of long-term political confrontation", it maintains that this does not mean that Taiwan can establish itself as a sovereign state in the name of the Republic of China, nor does it mean that the two sides of the Taiwan Strait have been divided into two sovereign states.

=== Other ===
On 28 February 2024, the European Parliament adopted its annual foreign policy report, which stated that "neither Taiwan nor China is subordinate to the other".

== See also ==
- Huadu (Taiwan)
- Soft Taiwan independence
