= One country, two areas =

- Traditional Chinese: 一國兩區
- Simplified Chinese: 一国两区
Transcriptions
Standard Mandarin
- Hanyu Pinyin: Yī guó liǎng qū

One Republic of China, two areas
- Traditional Chinese: 一個中華民國，兩個地區
- Simplified Chinese: 一个中华民国，两个地区
Transcriptions
Standard Mandarin
- Hanyu Pinyin: Yīgè Zhōnghuá Mínguó, liǎng gè dìqū

One China, two areas
- Traditional Chinese: 一個中國，兩個地區
- Simplified Chinese: 一个中国，两个地区
Transcriptions
Standard Mandarin
- Hanyu Pinyin: Yīgè Zhōngguó, liǎng gè dìqū

One nation, two areas
- Traditional Chinese: 一個國家，兩個地區
- Simplified Chinese: 一个国家，两个地区
Transcriptions
Standard Mandarin
- Hanyu Pinyin: Yīgè guójiā, liǎng gè dìqū

One country, two areas, interpreted in the Republic of China (Taiwan) as one Republic of China, two areas and in the People's Republic of China (PRC) as one China, two areas or one nation, two areas, is a cross-strait relations proposition put forward by the Kuomintang (KMT) to the Chinese Communist Party (CCP) in 2012 during the presidency of Ma Ying-jeou.

The concept of one China, two political entities and the constitutional interpretation of one China with respective interpretations derive from the Kuomintang's view. The Kuomintang believes that, according to the Additional Articles of the Constitution of the Republic of China and the Act Governing Relations between the People of the Taiwan Area and the Mainland Area, Taiwan, Penghu, Kinmen, and Matsu are the "free areas", while mainland China is the "mainland area". The one country, two areas proposition posits that both areas belong to the Republic of China's territory under the ROC Constitution. It views the relationship between Taiwan and mainland China as not a special state-to-state relationship, but a special region-to-region relationship. It argues both regions belong to China, and both the Republic of China and the People's Republic of China can claim to be part of China; they are mutually subordinate.

The People's Republic of China, represented by Jia Qinglin, the chairman of the National Committee of the Chinese People's Political Consultative Conference, responded by proposing the one country, two areas framework, arguing that Taiwan supports the one China framework and that both sides of the Taiwan Strait belong to one China. Wang Yi, the director of the Taiwan Affairs Office, explained that this proposition cannot deviate from the one China principle. He said the PRC is the sole legitimate representative of China, and it cannot be interpreted as the ROC representing China with different interpretations of "one China with respective interpretations". Wang said this would constitute pro-Taiwan independence rhetoric advocating for "two Chinas" or "one China, one Taiwan".

== History ==
In March 2012, Wu Po-hsiung, honorary chairman of the Kuomintang, interpreted "one country, two areas" as one country, two regions during a meeting between the Kuomintang and the Chinese Communist Party (CCP) in mainland China. This interpretation argued that both sides of the Taiwan Strait belong to one country, representing a special region-to-region relationship. Wu's initial statement did not explicitly define which country was being referred to. A spokesperson for the Taiwan Affairs Office declared that this signified Taiwan's acceptance of the one China principle. Jia Qinglin, a member of the Politburo Standing Committee of the Chinese Communist Party and chairman of the National Committee of the Chinese People's Political Consultative Conference (CPPCC), responded at the KMT-CCP forum, stating that both sides of the Taiwan Strait confirmed they belong to one China, and that the relationship between the two sides is not one between two countries, but rather a new starting point for mutual trust.

In Taiwan, President Ma Ying-jeou described the "one country, two areas" concept as "one China, two areas" in his 2012 presidential inauguration speech. However, when the government of the People's Republic of China participated in related meetings, the Kuomintang representatives did not explicitly state in public that the "one country" referred to was the Republic of China. The Kuomintang argued that this could be seen as an extension of the 1992 Consensus and the "one China" principle in the Constitution. The Kuomintang believed that this was a framework for handling cross-strait affairs under the Additional Articles to the Constitution of the Republic of China and the Act Governing Relations between the People of the Taiwan Area and the Mainland Area of the Republic of China government. The Republic of China could be divided into "free areas and mainland areas" at present. The Republic of China possessed sovereignty over both areas, but its jurisdiction only extended to the free areas, namely Taiwan, Penghu, Kinmen and Matsu. According to data from the Democratic Progressive Party (DPP) and some media, about 60% of the public opinion in Taiwan opposed this statement. The Kuomintang believed that this result was caused by the DPP deliberately misinterpreting Ma Ying-jeou's position when conducting the poll. Former American Institute in Taiwan Chairman Natale H. Bellocchi also expressed doubts about this statement.

== Content ==
=== Proposal by the Kuomintang ===
On 22 March 2012, Wu Po-hsiung, honorary chairman of the Kuomintang, met with Hu Jintao, general secretary of the Chinese Communist Party, and said:

The basis for the cross-strait relations we are currently promoting is the "Act Governing Relations between the People of the Taiwan Area and the Mainland Area," which is based on the concept of "one country, two areas." The department that handles cross-strait affairs is the Mainland Affairs Council, not the Ministry of Foreign Affairs. This is sufficient to show that the relationship between the two sides is not a relationship between two countries, but a special relationship.

To avoid the outside world from confusing the term with "one country, two systems", he later said at a press conference: "Please take a look at the Additional Articles of our Constitution, the Act Governing Relations between the People of the Taiwan Area and the Mainland Area. It is very clear, isn't it? It is originally the concept of the Mainland Area and the Taiwan Area, so it is called the Act Governing Relations between the People of the Taiwan Area. If you still misunderstand 'one country, two areas', then that is intentional."

On 28 March 2012, Ma Ying-jeou, chairman of the Kuomintang and the president of the Republic of China, cited a media report from 22 October 1992, at the Central Standing Committee meeting. He emphasized that when Huang Kun-huei, chairman of the Mainland Affairs Council, was questioned in the Legislative Yuan, he mentioned that the mainland policy of Taiwan was divided into "one country, two areas, and three stages". He stressed that such a constitutional framework has its historical context. "One Republic of China, two areas" refers to the Taiwan region and the mainland region. This is the status quo under the constitutional framework and also highlights the subjectivity of the Republic of China. He also emphasized that "this is not a new thing, and no one has given it new meaning. For twenty years, from President Lee Teng-hui to President Chen Shui-bian to myself, it has not changed."

Premier Sean Chen said: "'One country, two areas' (the mainland and Taiwan) is the same as our original understanding because there are relevant provisions in Article 11 of the Additional Articles of the Constitution. This is why there is the 'Cross-Strait Relations Act'. " Presidential Office Spokesperson Fan Chiang Tai-chi said: "The two sides of the Taiwan Strait are in a special relationship. Neither side recognizes the other's sovereignty nor denies the other's right to govern. Under the regulations of the Constitution of the Republic of China and the Act Governing Relations between the People of the Taiwan Area and the Mainland Area, the Taiwan area refers to 'Taiwan, Penghu, Kinmen, Matsu and other areas under the jurisdiction of the government,' while the Mainland area refers to the territory of the Republic of China outside of the Taiwan area, all of which belong to the Republic of China. 'One China' refers to the Republic of China."

On 20 May 2012, in his presidential inaugural address, Ma Ying-jeou reiterated that "one Republic of China, two areas" would be Taiwan's policy toward mainland China for the next four years. He advocated that the two sides of the Taiwan Strait should "not recognize each other’s sovereignty, but not deny each other’s governing authority", taking the German model as a reference. Mainland Affairs Council chairperson Lai Shin-yuan also stated that the outside world should not simplify "one Republic of China, two areas" to "one country, two areas". She said "One China" means the sovereign and independent Republic of China, and there is no other interpretation.

In 2016, Kuomintang Chairwoman Hung Hsiu-chu attended the 2016 Taipei Youth Elite Consensus Camp and reiterated that, according to the Constitution of the Republic of China, cross-strait relations are relations between two areas.

The Kuomintang's official definition of "one country, two areas":

1. Both sides of the Taiwan Strait adhere to the one-China principle, but their interpretations differ. The Chinese Communist Party (CCP) considers one China to be the People's Republic of China, and after reunification, Taiwan will become a special administrative region under its jurisdiction. Our side believes that one China refers to the Republic of China established in 1912, whose sovereignty extends to the whole of China, but currently its jurisdiction only extends to Taiwan, Penghu, Kinmen, and Matsu. While Taiwan is indeed part of China, the mainland is also part of China.
2. From 1949 onwards, China was in a state of temporary division, with two political entities governing the two sides of the Taiwan Strait. This is an objective fact, and any advocacy for unification cannot ignore the existence of this fact.
3. In pursuit of national development, prosperity, and the well-being of its people, the government of the Republic of China has formulated a national unification program, actively seeking consensus and initiating steps towards unification. We earnestly hope that the mainland authorities will adopt a pragmatic approach, setting aside prejudices and cooperating to contribute wisdom and strength to building a free, democratic, and prosperous China.

=== Chinese Communist Party response ===
At the 8th Cross-Strait Economic, Trade and Culture Forum, Jia Qinglin, member of the Politburo Standing Committee of the Chinese Communist and Chairman of the National Committee of the Chinese People's Political Consultative Conference, responded to the "one country, two areas" principle. He believes that the two sides' confirmation of the objective facts that China's territory and sovereignty have not been divided, that both sides belong to one China, and that cross-strait relations are not relations between two countries will be conducive to maintaining the "one China " framework and the peaceful development of cross-strait relations. Zhou Zhihuai, vice president of the China Taiwan Studies Association, pointed out that the consensus between the two sides that "both sides belong to one country" is a new starting point for cross-strait political mutual trust.

== Reactions in Taiwan ==
=== Support ===
Hsu Yao-chang, secretary-general of the Kuomintang Legislative Yuan caucus, and Chen Hsueh-sheng, a legislator, believed that Wu Po-hsiung's "one country, two areas" proposal was merely a formal expression of his position, without any political negotiation or "one country, two systems" issue. They also believed that "if the DPP refers to 'District Chief Ma,' does that mean that Chen Shui-bian was also 'District Chief Chen' when he was in power?" In addition, Hsu Yao-chang also stated that when the DPP was in power, "not to mention the name of the Republic of China, even the national flag and national anthem gradually disappeared. The people will judge who has the Republic of China in their hearts." He said "Everyone knows very well that the DPP does not have the Republic of China in their hearts. They only smear Ma Ying-jeou on sensitive issues and give the Ma government a red hat."

When attending the Taipei Forum, Hung Chi-chang, a veteran of the New Tide faction of the Democratic Progressive Party, and Julian Kuo, a former legislator, said that "one country, two areas is not unconstitutional" and that "one country, two areas should be derived from the English concept of ‘legal territory’. The legal territory of the Constitution of the Republic of China is indeed different from the actual jurisdiction. There is no problem with the legal interpretation of one country, two areas".

On 26 March 2012, the Taiwan-based China Unification Alliance issued a written response, affirming and recognizing the "one country, two areas" principle, believing that it "helps to enhance political mutual trust between the two sides and creates favorable conditions for opening political dialogue between the two sides." The Alliance believes that the "constitutional amendment" mentioned in the introduction of the supplementary articles in 1991 was "to meet the needs before national unification," and Article 11 of the supplementary articles clearly stipulates that "the rights and obligations of the people of the free area and the mainland area and other matters shall be handled by special provisions of law." Although there have been six "constitutional amendments" since then, the constitutional definition of the two sides as "one country, two areas" and the goal of "ultimate unification" have never changed. The "Act Governing Relations between the People of the Taiwan Area and the Mainland Area" formulated accordingly also maintains the "one country, two areas" framework. Therefore, regardless of whether it is based on the "constitution" or the current law, the two sides are defined as "one country, two areas," and there is no other interpretation possible.

=== Opposition ===
Former president Lee Teng-hui criticized Ma Ying-jeou for distorting history and falling into the CCP's "one China framework", calling it a reactionary proposition for democracy and an authoritarian restoration, and most tragically, for not daring to take responsibility. Former vice president Annette Lu stated that Ma Ying-jeou's "one country, two areas" statement rendered the Republic of China not a country, because apart from President Ma, no one would believe that "one China" refers to the "Republic of China," and that President Ma's statement was self-deceptive. Democratic Progressive Party and Taiwan Solidarity Union legislators and other pan-Green politicians condemned the move.

==== Democratic Progressive Party ====
In 2002, then-Mainland Affairs Council chairperson Tsai Ing-wen had emphasized that the legal concept of "one country, two areas" in the current Cross-Strait Relations Act should not be adjusted due to changes involving the framework of the constitutional amendments. The amendment of the relevant economic and trade regulations in the Cross-Strait Relations Act would be the primary focus of future adjustments. Tsai, the DPP's 2012 presidential candidate, said that the "one country, two areas" concept was quite dangerous and that President Ma Ying-jeou had to explain "what is the difference between the Republic of China and the People's Republic of China? What is their relationship?" She hoped that Ma Ying-jeou, who had long been vague on this issue, could clarify it. Tsai also published an "open letter to President Ma" on 14 May, in which she said that "one country, two areas" violated the constitutional intent. She said the "one country, two areas" concept in the constitutional structure is for handling the rights and obligations between the people of Taiwan and the people of the mainland. It is not equivalent to defining the relationship between the Republic of China and the People's Republic of China, nor does it "give the president any power to arbitrarily discuss the issue of cross-strait positioning with the Chinese government." "One country, two areas" is a retreat from the illusory "one China, different interpretations" that exists in terms of their respective spaces of expression to "one China, common interpretation." "One China, different interpretations" is also just a pretense used by the government for domestic purposes. It has never dared to openly and concretely practice "different interpretations" in cross-strait interactions. "One country, two areas" is to gradually eliminate Taiwan's subjectivity and deny Taiwan's national identity. Therefore, she hopes that Ma Ying-jeou will answer publicly: First, is Taiwan a country? Second, does the Republic of China or Taiwan belong to the same country as the People's Republic of China? Third, in future interactions with mainland China, will the government follow the consensus of the KMT-CCP platform and adhere to the principle of "one country, two areas"?

Kaohsiung Mayor Chen Chu, then acting chairperson of the Democratic Progressive Party, emphasized maintaining the status quo, stating that Taiwan is now the "Republic of China" and a "sovereign and independent country." DPP spokesperson Lo Chih-cheng strongly criticized the "One Country, Two Areas" proposal, stating that its greatest danger lies not only in diminishing Taiwan's status as a region, but more seriously in defining both sides of the Taiwan Strait as one country, completely contradicting the views of the Taiwanese people and altering the status quo. He questioned, "Is this President Ma's stance?" If Ma agrees with the so-called "One Country, Two Areas" concept, it would be "equivalent to formally declaring the abandonment or even elimination of the Republic of China." Such a significant policy change could, in particular, alter Taiwan's democratic freedom and sovereign status. Lin Chun-hsien also stated that Wu Po-hsiung received authorization from Ma, but "Ma did not receive authorization from the Taiwanese people." Even the Director of the National Security Bureau, responsible for national security, and Lai Hsin-yuan, the Mainland Affairs Council chairperson in charge of cross-strait affairs, admitted under questioning by legislators that they were completely unaware of the "One Country, Two Areas" proposal. This demonstrates that such a crucial matter concerning Taiwan's future has become a matter of "private dealings between the KMT and the CCP," depriving the people of even the opportunity to defend national sovereignty through oversight of the executive branch. "Does President Ma, who also serves as the chairman of the Kuomintang, intend to decide the national sovereignty of 23 million Taiwanese people through secret negotiations between the Kuomintang and the Communist Party?" Lin Yu-chang emphasized that the rash "one country, two areas" approach is extremely unwise, not only violating mainstream public opinion but also crossing the red line of Taiwanese society. Ma Ying-jeou, "without the consent of the people or through democratic procedures, directly based on his own ideology," positioned Taiwan and the People's Republic of China as "two areas of one country," which is a "change of the status quo." Furthermore, President Ma's attempt to pass off his personal will as the position of previous presidents is absurd and irresponsible. Su Huan-chih, the former Tainan County Magistrate who was running for the chairmanship of the Democratic Progressive Party, said that China is constantly suppressing Taiwan's international living space, and this statement is self-destructive. He said the Democratic Progressive Party should launch a protest to prevent the international community from misunderstanding that the Taiwanese people accept the one-China principle.

==== Taiwan Solidarity Union ====
Huang Kun-huei, chairman of the Taiwan Solidarity Union, angrily denounced Ma Ying-jeou for accepting this concept, saying it was tantamount to signing a new Treaty of Shimonoseki and handing over Taiwan's sovereignty to mainland China. He said that the Cross-Strait Relations Act regulates cross-strait interactions as quasi-international relations, and former president Lee Teng-hui's special state-to-state relations are the best interpretation of the Cross-Strait Relations Act; using the Cross-Strait Relations Act to interpret "one country, two areas" is a malicious distortion.

=== Other reactions ===
==== People First Party ====
James Soong, chairman of the People First Party, also raised three questions. He said that any decision and statement involving the positioning of Taiwan and the mainland must be rigorous and cautious. However, like the "cross-strait peace agreement" put forward during the election, Ma Ying-jeou's "decision-making model is arbitrary and unilateral." He said even the Mainland Affairs Council and other administrative departments had never heard of it. Moreover, the person who put forward it did not hold a government position, which is a very irresponsible practice. He added this must not only be open and transparent, but should also be communicated with the major political parties in advance. It is not up to him to decide. James Soong also sternly refuted Ma and Wu for "mistaking the level of affairs for the level of constitution" and "mixing concepts and terms together."

=== Public opinion poll ===
The National Election Research Center of National Chengchi University, commissioned by the Mainland Affairs Council, conducted a nationwide telephone survey from 30 March to 2 April 2012. The survey showed that 29.9% of respondents opposed the unification, and the percentage of those who advocated "maintaining the status quo forever" was rising. 32.4% advocated "maintaining the status quo and then deciding later". The percentage of those who "publicly advocated Taiwan independence" (15.7% for "maintaining the status quo and then independence" or 6.1% for "independence as soon as possible") reached 21.8%. The percentage of those who "publicly advocated cross-strait unification" (8.2% for "maintaining the status quo and then unification" or 1.5% for "unification as soon as possible") was only 9.7%. This means that more than 90% of the Taiwanese public opinion indicated that they did not advocate "cross-strait unification". The survey results showed that the Taiwanese people did not agree with the "one country, two areas" proposition with the intention of "unification" and had expressed a clearer anti-unification consciousness. In addition, the survey conducted by Farview Magazine in 2012 was different from the survey conducted by National Chengchi University on unification and independence. According to Farview Magazine, 22.9% of respondents were supporters of unification and 49.1% were supporters of independence. The two polls are not consistent and there is a considerable gap. In recent years, the accuracy of polls in Taiwan has been inaccurate. The main reason may be related to the political stance of the surveyors. For example, in the 2012 presidential election, the National Chengchi University Election Research Center predicted that Tsai Ing-wen would be elected by a slight margin, but the result was inconsistent with the poll.

=== Media and civil society organizations ===
The pro-Green Liberty Times editorial published a commentary questioning whether President Ma, if he had the guts, should instruct Wu Po-hsiung to declare in mainland China that "one country is the Republic of China, and the mainland is the territory of the Republic of China." Apple Daily, under Jimmy Lai, believed that the CCP regime and the KMT have formed a united front to promote the blurring of the "one China" principle, thus weakening the DPP's "one China, one Taiwan" argument. It claimed the KMT and the CCP secretly exchanged favors, and the DPP's strong opposition to this gained "legitimacy".

Former President of the Examination Yuan and convener of the "Taiwan National Alliance" Yao Chia-wen and other local groups criticized the "one country, two areas" policy for making the outside world think that Taiwan is one of China's regions, which seriously damaged Taiwan's national interests and violated the "criminal law" on treason and said they would be held accountable. Former Director of the National History Museum Chang Yen-hsien said that Ma Ying-jeou should say that the People's Republic of China is part of the Constitution of the Republic of China, but Ma's actions violated the Constitution of the Republic of China and were suspected of treason. Former Representative to Japan Lo Fu-chuan said, "Ma Ying-jeou did not mention it during the presidential election, but only mentioned it now. He is deceiving the people." He claimed Ma Ying-jeou's mentality is to sell out Taiwan.

The Taiwan Independence Alliance believed that Ma Ying-jeou's "self-destruction" at this time is probably due to his poor governance, which has caused widespread discontent. They said this must be used as a smokescreen to divert attention, and the Alliance calls on the people to recall the "accomplice legislator". Tsai Ting-kuei, the convener of the "Referendum to Protect Taiwan Alliance", and others also expressed strong dissatisfaction, criticizing Wu Po-hsiung's statement as betraying the interests of the Taiwanese people and "making Taiwan Hong Kong-like", which also highlights the absurdity of the Republic of China Constitution. The Taiwanese people should strongly condemn this and actively plan protest activities to express their anger to Ma and Wu. The Taiwan Professors Association and Taiwan Society reiterated that the way to defend Taiwan's national personality and resolve the confusion of national identity is to correct the errors in the Constitution, and it is necessary to clearly explain in the Constitution that the current situation between Taiwan and mainland China is "state-to-state relations". The pan-green political groups will promote a new wave of "constitutional reform movement". DPP legislator Lee Ying-yuan and Taiwan Solidarity Union legislator Lin Shih-chia also proposed to abolish the word "unification" in the preamble of the 1991 amendment.

== Other reactions ==
=== People's Republic of China ===
On 29 May 2012, Yang Yi, spokesperson for the Taiwan Affairs Office, commented on "one country, two areas", saying that as long as the "one China" principle is recognized, other issues can be discussed. According to Yang Yi’s statement, the outside world believes that the government of the People's Republic of China accepts the "one country, two areas" theory. Wang Yingjin, a scholar at Renmin University of China, believes that Yang Yi’s statement does not mean that the government of the People's Republic of China accepts the "one country, two areas" theory. "Not explicitly opposing does not mean complete acceptance." In the absence of strong opposition to the "1992 Consensus, one China with different interpretations " and in a state of "tacit acceptance" by the government of the People's Republic of China, there is no need to take a positive or negative attitude toward the "one country, two areas" theory. China News Network stated that the "one country, two areas" principle aligns with the statement issued by United States president Barack Obama in February 2012 during Xi Jinping's visit to the U.S., which rejected Taiwan independence, and is consistent with the hints made by former U.S. ambassador to China J. Stapleton Roy regarding the progress of cross-strait relations.

On 30 May 2012, Yang Yi, spokesperson for the Taiwan Affairs Office, responded at a regular press conference to the concept of "one Republic of China, two areas" proposed by President Ma Ying-jeou, as well as the suggestion to develop cross-strait relations based on the model of the reunification of Germany. Yang Yi said that this is Ma Ying-jeou's consistent policy and the mainland is not surprised. The model of the reunification of Germany is not applicable to China because China's sovereignty and territorial integrity have not been divided. "The fact that both sides of the Taiwan Strait belong to one China has not changed. The two sides of the Taiwan Strait are not two Chinas, and cross-strait relations are not relations between two countries." He added that "this is an objective fact".

=== United States ===
The United States government administration expressed concerns about this incident to President Ma Ying-jeou through various channels, both publicly and privately, and hoped that President Ma will explain it to the U.S. An official in charge of cross-strait affairs said on 10 April, "We really don’t understand the meaning of ‘one country, two areas’. We did not expect this issue to arise, and we expect Taiwan to provide a good explanation. Most people in Taiwan agree with the ‘status quo’ and there is really no need to talk about a ‘peace agreement’. The United States does not want to see Taiwan being pressured to reach some kind of political agreement, which would lead to instability in the Taiwan Strait."

Some members of the U.S. Congress also expressed concern about this. When the United States House Committee on Foreign Affairs Chairwoman Ileana Ros-Lehtinen visited Taiwan with President Ma Ying-jeou's delegation, she specifically asked President Ma to further explain and discuss his statement. Ros-Lehtinen said that the delegation did have its own views on this statement, and the members' opinions were not consistent. Taiwan and the United States have common interests and values, but the delegation or the U.S. side cannot make decisions on behalf of the Taiwanese government or people. The consistent position emphasized by the U.S. side is that it hopes Taiwan will continue to play the role of a beacon of hope, opportunity, freedom, prosperity and human rights.

=== Japan ===
Japan expressed doubts about the Ma administration's advocacy of the "one country, two areas" policy and was worried that Taiwan's excessive pro-China stance would change the status quo of the Asia-Pacific situation. Therefore, Japan suggested that the Legislative Yuan's "Taiwan-Japan Friendship Association" make more efforts in parliamentary diplomacy.
