= Ultimate unification =

- Traditional Chinese: 終極統一
- Simplified Chinese: 终极统一
Transcriptions
Standard Mandarin
- Hanyu Pinyin: Zhōngjí tǒngyī

Ultimate unification, also called eventual unification, is a discourse on the future direction of cross-strait relations that promotes Chinese unification in the long-term under certain conditions. It posits that the Republic of China (ROC), which currently governs Taiwan, Penghu, Kinmen, and Matsu, and the People's Republic of China (PRC), which governs mainland China, are "one China, two political entities". While the current situation is characterized by two Chinas due to China's division and separate governance, the supporters of ultimate unification believe that at some point in the future, under certain conditions, they should be unified into one China. This concept originates from the ROC's "One China" policy. In the Guidelines for National Unification passed by the Lee Teng-hui administration, ultimate unification replaced the previous Chiang Ching-kuo administration's "Three Principles of the People Unifying China" policy, becoming one of the ROC government's discourses on cross-strait policy.

The ultimate unification theory presupposes that the People's Republic of China is independent and no longer part of the Republic of China. Its ultimate goal is the political unification of Taiwan and mainland China. It does not support maintaining the status quo across the Taiwan Strait permanently, but it avoids the question of when and how unification will begin, essentially supporting not setting an end date for the status quo. Proponents of ultimate unification oppose the "one country on each side" approach and other policies promoting Taiwan independence, but they also oppose direct political negotiations and unification under the current circumstances. They set conditions, hoping for unification after mainland China has undergone social liberalization and democratization. Before mainland China undergoes a democratic transition, they oppose setting a timetable for an urgent unification proposal.

The opposite concept of ultimate unification is "ultimate independence", which is one of the traditional arguments for Taiwan independence. It means that at some point in the future, and under certain conditions, the Republic of China system that currently exists in Taiwan will be replaced by a new Republic of Taiwan, thus achieving true Taiwan independence.

== Background ==
After the Chinese Civil War, the Republic of China government, led by the Kuomintang, retreated to Taiwan, while the Chinese Communist Party (CCP) established the People's Republic of China (PRC) on the mainland. Both sides believed that only they could represent the legitimate China and denied the legitimacy of the other's existence.

In 1971, the RAND Corporation published "Remaking China Policy", advocating "One China, but not now". Under this policy, Taiwan was considered Chinese territory, not currently part of the People's Republic of China, but potentially to be unified with China in the future.

In Taiwan, proponents of ultimate unification often cite the Constitution of the Republic of China and its Additional Articles as the basis for Taiwan's pursuit of ultimate unification. During President Lee Teng-hui's term, the 1991 Guidelines for National Unification were adopted, aiming for Chinese unification. However, he believed this goal would be achieved in three phases, without a time limit, but ultimately, both sides would reunify. In his book, Taiwan's Claim, Lee Teng-hui stated:

China should be unified, but it must be unified under a democratic, free, and equitable system that takes into account the interests of all Chinese people and conforms to the world trend, rather than under the communist system that has been proven to fail in practice or the so-called "one country, two systems".

Compared with the "counterattack the mainland" during Chiang Kai-shek's era or the Three Principles of the People's policy of unifying China during Chiang Ching-kuo's era, the ultimate unification does not emphasize the initiative of Taiwan to unify China. The stance of this program was later interpreted as ultimate unification.

In July 1999, Lee Teng-hui proposed that the cross-strait relationship was "at least a special relationship between two countries." This view, known as the "two-states theory", did not support or oppose ultimate unification. Based on the idea of the two-states theory, the Democratic Progressive Party (DPP) further proposed the Resolution on Taiwan's Future, advocating Taiwan independence and that Taiwan's future be determined by the Taiwanese people themselves. During the DPP's administration from 2000 to 2008, the Republic of China government no longer pursued ultimate unification, abolished the National Unification Council and the Guidelines for National Unification, but made the Four Noes and One Without without guarantee. After the Kuomintang returned to power in 2008, its view on ultimate unification became more low-key, emphasizing "one China with respective interpretations", the "1992 Consensus", the "one China" principle in the Constitution, and "no unification, no independence, no use of force". In 2015, Hung Hsiu-chu intended to run for the 2016 presidential election. After Hung Hsiu-chu put forward the argument that the Republic of China Constitution supported ultimate unification, because it was believed that her cross-strait views might endanger the election, a controversy arose over replacing her. The Kuomintang eventually changed its presidential candidate to Eric Chu.

== History ==
=== Early stage ===
When Lee Teng-hui was president of the Republic of China, he repeatedly vowed to pursue the unification of China. For example, on 13 April 1989, when Lee Teng-hui received French visitors, he said: "There is only one China, and it will definitely be unified in the future." However, he then added that because the political systems on both sides of the Taiwan Strait are different, unification is not possible in the short term. He hoped that unification would only take place after the mainland has achieved a free, democratic, and equitable society. In the later period of his administration, the "two-states theory" emerged.

=== Chen Shui-bian administration ===
On 25 October 2004, United States secretary of state Colin Powell visited China and was interviewed by CNN and Phoenix Television. During the interview, he mentioned that Taiwan does not enjoy national sovereignty and is not a sovereign independent country. He also expressed his hope that the two sides of the Taiwan Strait would reach a peaceful reunification after negotiations. Subsequently, the U.S. State Department issued a statement saying that it was a slip of the tongue. The Taiwan Affairs Office said it believes that this is in line with the U.S. position on the one-China principle.

In 2005, the 10th National People's Congress passed the Anti-Secession Law, declaring its determination to pursue the unification of China. In the same year, Ma Ying-jeou, who was then the chairman of the Kuomintang, said in an interview with Newsweek that the ultimate goal of the Kuomintang was to pursue unification. At that time, Wang Jin-pyng, the President of the Legislative Yuan, believed that this was Ma Ying-jeou's personal opinion and did not represent the overall position of the Kuomintang. In response to Ma Ying-jeou's remarks, the Chen Shui-bian government proposed to abolish the Guidelines for National Unification and the National Unification Council. In January 2006, Ma Ying-jeou had a dinner with Japanese media and explained the theory of ultimate unification, believing that it was in line with the One-China Constitution and the Guidelines for National Unification, and that the main goal was to maintain the status quo. Subsequently, during his visit to the United States and Europe in February, he avoided talking about the topic of ultimate unification and stopping the civil war, and once again positioned the pursuit of ultimate unification as maintaining the status quo and keeping Chen Shui-bian's Four Noes and One Without, in order to eliminate the doubts of the United States and Europe about the theory of ultimate unification. Equating ultimate unification with maintaining the status quo rather than actively pursuing unification became the official position of the Kuomintang.

In 2007, entrepreneur Robert Tsao published an article advocating for the passage of the Cross-Strait Peaceful Coexistence Act in Taiwan to promote a referendum on unification. He was criticized by President Chen Shui-bian and the DPP Legislative Yuan caucus for his stance being the same as that of Hu Jintao, the General Secretary of the Chinese Communist Party, and Ma Ying-jeou, the Kuomintang presidential candidate, which was aimed at achieving the ultimate unification of one China.

=== Ma Ying-jeou administration ===
Lee Kuan Yew, the founding father of Singapore, long supported the ultimate unification of the two sides of the Taiwan Strait. In an interview with the Central News Agency in 2008, he believed that Ma Ying-jeou's proposition of no unification, no independence, no use of force improved cross-strait relations, but did not adhere to the Kuomintang's original ultimate unification stance.

In the 2012 presidential election, in 2011, Ma Ying-jeou proposed the Golden Decade Plan, which included a peace agreement with mainland China. The Democratic Progressive Party and the Taiwan Solidarity Union criticized the peace agreement for being based on the One China principle and aiming at ultimate unification. On 25 November 2011, James Soong, chairman of the People First Party, accepted an interview with the BBC and proposed that Taiwan should pursue ultimate unification in accordance with the Constitution of the Republic of China, criticizing Ma Ying-jeou for not restoring the Guidelines for National Unification. On the same day, when he accepted an interview with Next TV, he denied that his position was ultimate unification.

In 2012, the 18th National Congress of the Chinese Communist Party was held, and the 1992 Consensus was included in the political report for the first time. Xin Qi believes that the 1992 Consensus, which adheres to the one-China principle, can promote peaceful development across the Taiwan Strait, and the ultimate goal of peaceful development is peaceful reunification. In 2013, Wu Po-hsiung, honorary chairman of the Kuomintang, visited mainland China and met with Xi Jinping, general secretary of the Chinese Communist Party. He proposed that the Kuomintang promote the one China architecture, which was considered to be in line with the one China framework.

In 2014, the Ma Ying-jeou government promoted a minor adjustment to the high school curriculum guidelines, which was criticized by scholars such as Chang Yen-hsien for its purpose of promoting ultimate unification. Student groups and the Taiwan Solidarity Union that participated in the anti-curriculum adjustment movement also demanded the withdrawal of the minor curriculum adjustment for the same reason. In May of the same year, Shih Ming-teh, Su Chi, and others proposed the "New One-High School Principle," also known as the "University One-High School Framework." The TSU criticized it as a repackaging of Ma Ying-jeou's ultimate unification theory.

In September 2014, Ma Ying-jeou had a tea party with foreign journalists and mentioned that he would refer to the experience of the two Germanies to formulate cross-strait policies. According to this conversation, the German magazine Der Spiegel reported that Ma Ying-jeou would promote the ultimate unification by using the German reunification model. The Presidential Office of the Republic of China subsequently issued a statement that the report was incorrect. Ma Ying-jeou emphasized that he would not adopt the "one Germany, two countries" model, but would adopt the "one China with respective interpretations" approach according to the Constitution, and did not mention supporting or opposing the ultimate unification. In an interview with the Xiamen Strait Herald, Wang Xiaobo said that he was a long-time friend of Ma Ying-jeou and said that Ma Ying-jeou's direction was the ultimate unification and a cross-strait peace agreement, but he dared not say it because he was limited by the lack of support from the Taiwanese public, which caused the public to not understand. This report was reprinted by the Hong Kong-based Wen Wei Po and sent back to Taiwan. However, Wang Xiaobo's statement was not confirmed by the Presidential Office. Presidential Office spokesperson Luo Zhiqiang said that Ma Ying-jeou supported no unification, no independence, and no use of force. At a seminar held by Chinese Culture University, Gui Hongcheng, director of the Kuomintang's Mainland Affairs Department, said that the Kuomintang supports the two sides of the Taiwan Strait moving towards unification in the future, while the proposition of no unification, no independence, and no use of force means that unification will not be carried out now.

In April 2015, Ma Ying-jeou proposed a new "three no's" policy at the Mainland Affairs Council, which is to guarantee that he would not promote "two Chinas, one China and one Taiwan, and Taiwan independence". In May, Kuomintang Chairman Eric Chu and Chinese Communist Party General Secretary Xi Jinping held a meeting at the Great Hall of the People in Beijing. The Associated Press reported that Chu proposed that both sides of the Taiwan Strait belong to one China during the meeting, which was considered to be an expression of support for the ultimate unification of China. After Kuomintang spokesperson Yang Weizh ong protested to the Associated Press, the news agency corrected the content, changing it to "Chu supports the 1992 Consensus, but this was interpreted by the Beijing government as support for the ultimate unification". Other foreign media, such as The Guardian, also reported similarly, believing that Chu, on behalf of the Kuomintang, promised the CCP to support the unification of China. Chu believed that this was a malicious distortion taken out of context, but did not clearly state whether he supported or opposed the ultimate unification. Wu Yu-sheng, the chief whip of the Kuomintang Legislative Yuan caucus, held a press conference and cited Tsai Ing-wen's advocacy of "future one China" in 2000. He believed that Eric Chu's advocacy adhered to the 1992 Consensus, while Tsai Ing-wen's advocacy in 2000 was the ultimate unification.

In October, Kuomintang presidential candidate Hung Hsiu-chu believed that the Constitution of the Republic of China was the ultimate unification. Although Hung clarified that she said "the Republic of China will unify the two sides of the Taiwan Strait", her statement was still considered to be pro-communist, causing a great uproar. Many Kuomintang legislators suggested that the Kuomintang Central Committee immediately replace Hung Hsiu-chu to avoid her surrender-oriented statement dragging down the legislative election. The Kuomintang also criticized Hung Hsiu-chu's statement and eventually abolished her nomination through the extraordinary National Congress, replacing her with Eric Chu, which was called the "Replace Hung Hsiu-chu Action".

Chen Changwen wrote to the media, arguing that ultimate unification implies forcing the people to unify, which is difficult for people to accept. He suggested that the Kuomintang should change its rhetoric and advocate for the pursuit of a mutually agreeable unification between the two sides of the Taiwan Strait.

=== Tsai Ing-wen administration ===
In 2016, during the term of Hung Hsiu-chu as chairperson, the Kuomintang held its 19th National Congress and passed the Peace Platform on 5 September 2016, advocating the deepening of the 1992 Consensus and the end of the hostile situation between the two sides through a peace agreement. Researcher Wang Jianmin believes that the Kuomintang's main core concept is to recognize the “1992 Consensus” and “both sides of the Taiwan Strait belong to one China”, and the main progress is to stop mentioning “one China with respective interpretations”. Pang Jianguo accepted an interview with the reporter of the Guide and agreed that the passage of the Peace Platform and advocated pursuing the ultimate unification of the two sides of the Taiwan Strait in accordance with the provisions of the Constitution of the Republic of China. He said this is very important to the Kuomintang and Taiwan.

On 22 May 2018, Kuomintang Chairman Wu Den-yih attended the first working meeting of the Central Committee on Religious Affairs and mentioned that the "ultimate goal of the Constitutional Amendment Articles" is to take national unification as the principle. At this stage, the legislative members of the "free areas" Taiwan, Penghu, Kinmen and Matsu) can be re-elected. Wu Den-yih explained that in the Constitutional Amendment Articles, "before national unification", Taiwan, Penghu, Kinmen and Matsu are called "free areas" and the others are called "mainland areas". He said "At that time, the re-election of legislative members could only be carried out in free areas and could not be carried out in Beijing or Tianjin". He added "At that time, the Constitutional Amendment Articles stipulated that the ultimate goal of the country is to take unification as the principle. However, at this stage, the free areas can still be re-elected." He emphasized that when thinking about the Constitutional Amendment Articles and the Act Governing Relations between the People of the Taiwan Area and the Mainland Area, one can know that the basic relationship between the two sides of the Taiwan Strait is to maintain a peaceful and stable development. On 7 January 2019, Chang Ya-chung, the principal of Sun Yat-sen School, announced his intention to run for president of the Republic of China on behalf of the Kuomintang. He said that the two sides of the Taiwan Strait are brothers and one family, and should adhere to the Constitution of the Republic of China and end the current state of hostility between the two sides. He will not hesitate to talk to Beijing to discuss the political positioning before the peaceful reunification of the two sides.

== Taiwan poll support ==
In 2011, the magazine Vision published a poll in which 67.1% of the public believed that there was no need for unification when the social status quo on both sides of the Taiwan Strait was similar. This was not significantly different from the survey conducted in December 2010. In the question of whether Taiwan and mainland China should eventually unify, 15.7% were in favor, a decrease of 1.7% from the December 2010 survey; 69.6% were against, an increase of 0.2%.

According to the regular survey conducted by the Election Research Center of National Chengchi University since 1992. In terms of long-term trends, during Lee Teng-hui's administration, the percentage of Taiwanese people who supported China's unification was around 20%. After the Democratic Progressive Party came to power, it dropped to 15%. After Ma Ying-jeou came to power, it remained around 10%. According to the poll results released in January 2015, 9.2% of Taiwanese people supported unification and unification as soon as possible. According to the poll results in July, the percentage of people who supported unification and unification as soon as possible shrank to 9.1%, and the percentage of people who identified themselves as Chinese was only 3.3%, which is the lowest point since the survey began in 1992.

According to a regular poll released by Taiwan Polling Indicator Company on 15 October 2015, only 10.5% of Taiwanese people supported ultimate unification in the multiple-choice question regarding their views on the current state and future of cross-strait relations. A poll conducted by United Daily News from 31 August to 9 September 2016, showed that regarding Taiwan's future, 7% advocated for rapid unification, 10% advocated for gradual unification, 47% hoped to maintain the status quo forever, and the remaining 4% had no opinion. Chen Luhui, a specially appointed researcher at the National Chengchi University Graduate School of Political Science and a joint professor in the Department of political science, said that 17% favored unification (rapid unification and gradual unification).
