= No unification, no independence, no use of force =

Political slogan in Taiwan

- Traditional Chinese: 不統、不獨、不武
- Simplified Chinese: 不统、不独、不武
Transcriptions
Standard Mandarin
- Hanyu Pinyin: Bùtǒng, bùdú, bùwǔ

New Three Noes
- Traditional Chinese: 新三不政策
- Simplified Chinese: 新三不政策
Transcriptions
Standard Mandarin
- Hanyu Pinyin: Xīn sān bù zhèngcè

"No unification, no independence, no use of force" is a Taiwanese political term and slogan proposed by Ma Ying-jeou during the 2008 Taiwanese presidential election as a policy platform and one of the principles of his cross-strait policy during his term. It is often referred to as the "New Three Noes" in contrast to the Three Noes policy (no contact, no negotiation, no compromise). It is frequently considered a supplement to the 1992 Consensus, the "one China, one China" principle, and the "one China" principle in the Constitution. Its main content is not to promote Chinese unification, not to declare Taiwan independence, and not to engage in military war between the two sides. After Ma Ying-jeou took office, this principle replaced the Four Noes and One Without of the Chen Shui-bian era, and is generally considered to mean maintaining the status quo regarding the political status of Taiwan.

== History ==
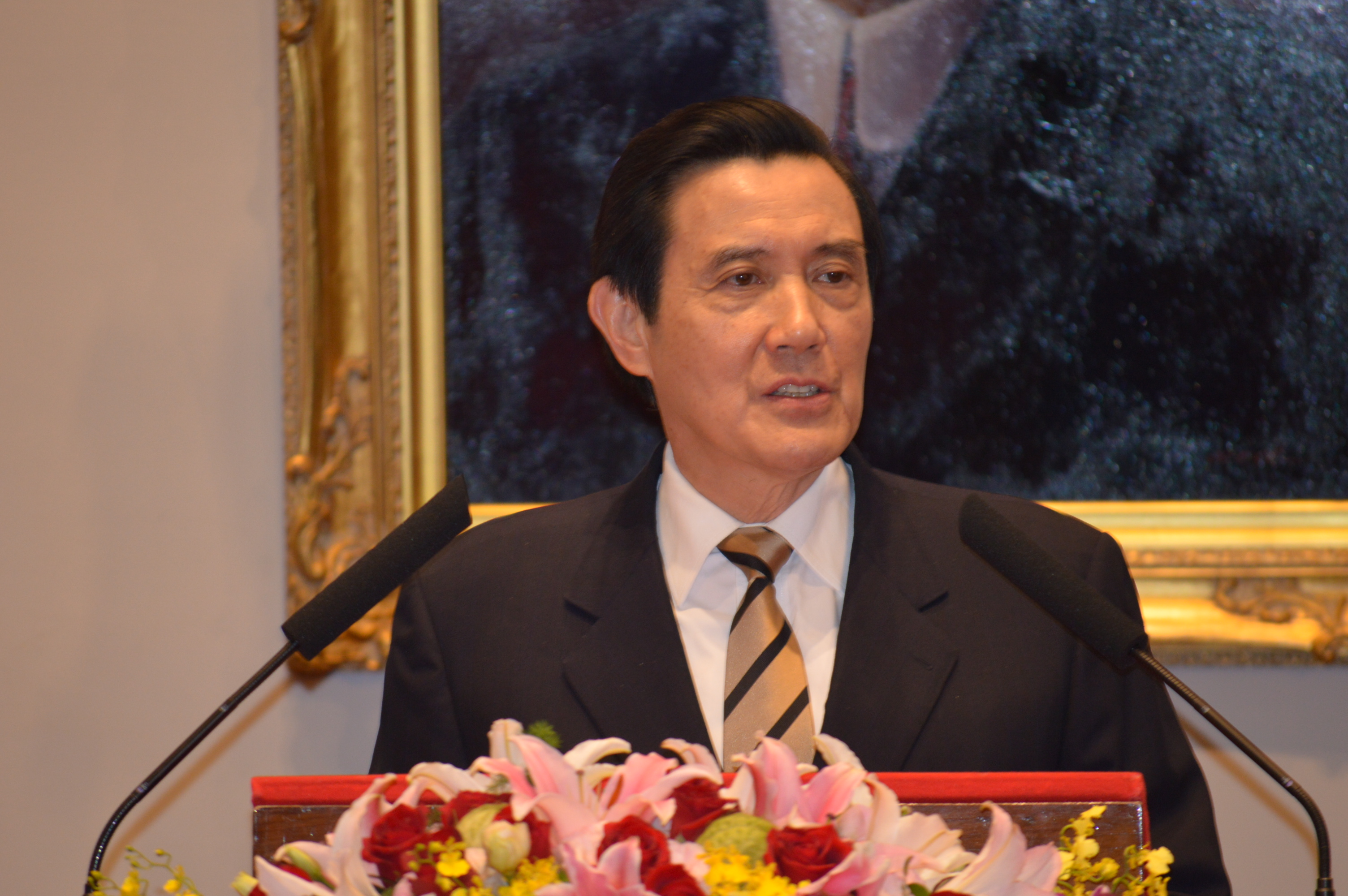
Ma Ying-jeou, the president of the Republic of China

The slogan "no unification, no independence, no use of force" was first proposed by Su Chi in 2007 and became Ma Ying-jeou's political platform in the 2008 Taiwanese presidential election. In 2008, former Singaporean prime minister Lee Kuan Yew was interviewed by the Central News Agency and believed that Ma Ying-jeou's proposition of "no unification, no independence, no use of force" made cross-strait relations more relaxed and progressive, but did not adhere to the Kuomintang’s original position of ultimate unification.

In April 2015, Ma Ying-jeou reiterated the New Three Noes policy at the Mainland Affairs Council, which is to guarantee that he will not promote "two Chinas, one China, one Taiwan, and Taiwan independence". At the video conference commemorating the 70th anniversary of the War of Resistance against Japan on 3 June 2015, Ma Ying-jeou further stated that the term "status quo" was first used to describe cross-strait relations in his 2008 inaugural address, where he pledged to uphold the principles of no unification, no independence, and no use of force, and to promote cross-strait relations within the framework of the Constitution of the Republic of China, based on the "1992 Consensus and the principle of 'one China with respective interpretations'". These are the main elements constituting the status quo. Ma Ying-jeou said that the current situation is very different from the "status quo" seven years ago. He said the cross-strait relations have progressed to a considerable extent, and people on both sides of the strait believe it is necessary to maintain the status quo. Even opposition presidential candidates say they support the status quo, which is an interesting development, as opposition leaders usually advocate changing the status quo. In addition, he promised seven years ago that he would not engage in political dialogue on unification with mainland China, nor would he declare independence. The status quo is no unification, no independence, and no use of force. Maintaining these three points will maintain the status quo, but he is unsure whether the public still has confidence that the future president can achieve this. Ma Ying-jeou also mentioned that "One China" is the Republic of China, and he will not promote the policies of two Chinas, one China, one Taiwan, or Taiwan independence. He said these guarantees have become the cornerstone for making the status quo very stable. He added this status quo is the current status quo, not the status quo seven years ago when the Democratic Progressive Party was in power.

At a seminar held by Chinese Culture University, Kuei Hung-cheng, director of the Kuomintang's Mainland Affairs Department, said that the Kuomintang supports the ultimate unification of the two sides of the Taiwan Strait in the future, while the proposition of "no unification, no independence, no use of force" means that unification will not be carried out now. In addition, the proposition of "no unification, no independence, no use of force" was classified by commentator Li Chia-chuan as a pro-independence stance.

On 7 November 2018, the third anniversary of the 2015 meeting of Ma Ying-jeou and Xi Jinping, the Ma Ying-jeou Foundation, together with the Central Policy Research Office of the Chinese Communist Party and the Center for Foreign Policy Studies of the College of International Affairs of National Chengchi University, held a " olicy Seminar on the Third Anniversary of the Ma-Xi Meeting" on 7 to 8 November at the Linze Hall International Conference Hall of the College of Law of National Taiwan University. Scholars, experts and people with experience in cross-strait affairs were invited to discuss the future of cross-strait relations. In his speech, Ma Ying-jeou said that to maintain the status quo across the Taiwan Strait, it is not possible to reject the "1992 Consensus, one China with different interpretations". He pointed out that the "1992 Consensus" is the key to the development of cross-strait relations and believes that maintaining the status quo of peaceful development across the Taiwan Strait based on the principle of "not rejecting unification, not supporting Taiwan independence, and not using force" is the best choice for Taiwan.
