= One China, two political entities =

- Traditional Chinese: 一個中國，兩個政治實體
- Simplified Chinese: 一个中国，两个政治实体
Transcriptions
Standard Mandarin
- Hanyu Pinyin: Yīgè zhōngguó, liǎng gè zhèngzhì shítǐ

One China, two equal political entities
- Traditional Chinese: 一個中國，兩個對等政治實體
- Simplified Chinese: 一个中国，两个对等政治实体
Transcriptions
Standard Mandarin
- Hanyu Pinyin: Yīgè zhōngguó, liǎng gè duì děng zhèngzhì shítǐ

A divided China, two equal political entities.
- Traditional Chinese: 分裂的中國，兩個對等政治實體
- Simplified Chinese: 分裂的中国，两个对等政治实体
Transcriptions
Standard Mandarin
- Hanyu Pinyin: Fēnliè de zhōngguó, liǎng gè duì děng zhèngzhì shítǐ

Two equal political entities within a single country
- Traditional Chinese: 一個國家內，兩個對等政治實體
- Simplified Chinese: 一个国家内，两个对等政治实体
Transcriptions
Standard Mandarin
- Hanyu Pinyin: Yīgè guójiā nèi, liǎng gè duì děng zhèngzhì shítǐ

Abbreviation
- Traditional Chinese: 一國兩體
- Simplified Chinese: 一国两体
Transcriptions
Standard Mandarin
- Hanyu Pinyin: Yī guó liǎng tǐ

One China, two political entities, also called one China, two equal political entities, a divided China, two equal political entities, one country, two equal political entities and abbreviated as one country, two entities, is the expression of one China by the Lee Teng-hui government of the Republic of China (ROC). This proposed formulation argues that since 1949, China has been in a state of temporary division and separation, with the Republic of China and the People's Republic of China (PRC) ruling the two sides of the Taiwan Strait respectively, each representing China. The ROC retains sovereignty over China but only governs Taiwan, Penghu, Kinmen, and Matsu. Taiwan hopes that Beijing will acknowledge this reality of division and engage in negotiations on an equal footing to achieve ultimate unification.

The concept replaced the previous Three Principles of the People's unification of China and the Three Noes policy. The theoretical basis of this scheme is the parallel representation of the divided country, and the legal source is the 1991 Additional Articles to the Constitution of the Republic of China and the Guidelines for National Unification, which was the highest guiding principle for cross-strait relations during the term of President Lee Teng-hui. This expression scheme later gave rise to propositions such as one country, two areas, one country, two governments, one China, two constitutions, one China in the constitution, one China with respective interpretations, and special relations between countries. During the term of President Chen Shui-bian, the Guidelines for National Unification were abolished in 2006 and suspended, but this proposition was still inherited by the Kuomintang.

The People's Republic of China (PRC) asserts that the Republic of China was dissolved in 1949 and that the PRC is the sole legitimate representative of China. Therefore, it considers this proposal to be a form of pro-Taiwan independence advocacy involving two Chinas and one China, one Taiwan, and intends to use the name of the Republic of China to promote separatism, meaning that the PRC rejects this proposal.

== history ==
In the 1970s, the United States proposed a dual representation scheme, hoping that the Republic of China and the People's Republic of China could participate in the international community under the premise of one China. In 1969, U.S. Secretary of State William P. Rogers issued a formal statement in Canberra, Australia, on the United States' desire to make diplomatic contact with the People's Republic of China, in which he asserted that the existence of the Republic of China and the People's Republic of China were both established facts. The statement said: "We (the United States) acknowledge that the Republic of China in Taiwan and the CCP on the mainland are both established facts. We also know that the CCP will eventually play an important role in the Asia-Pacific region.... We sincerely welcome the renegotiation with the CCP." Behind these schemes, the simultaneous recognition that the Republic of China and the People's Republic of China are both political entities was intended. However, these schemes were resisted by both the Republic of China and the People's Republic of China and failed.

During Chiang Ching-kuo's presidency, he once raised the China question, believing that the reason for China's division was the struggle between the two Chinas formed after the founding of the People's Republic of China: the "Three Principles of the People China" based on Chinese culture and the "Communist China" based on Marxism–Leninism. This statement already implies the concept that the Republic of China and the People's Republic of China are two equal political entities. When Wei Yong served as a researcher at the Hoover Institution in the United States from 1975, he proposed the concept of a multi-system state, under the premise that they belong to one China, there can be multiple political entities with different political systems. This proposal cited the Basic Treaty of the Two Germanys in the German model, hoping that the Republic of China and the People's Republic of China would first recognize each other as equal states with sovereignty, but based on the feelings of the same nation, the Republic of China and the People's Republic of China would share the right to represent China, forming two Chinas first, and then moving towards the unification of China.

Following the political turmoil of February 1990, a national affairs conference resolved that both ruling and opposition parties would hold Taiwan's first presidential election and a full-scale re-election of the legislature. That same year, Lee Teng-hui was elected President of the Republic of China, promulgated the Additional Articles to the Constitution of the Republic of China, and ceased the mobilization for the suppression of rebellion. Simultaneously, the National Unification Council was convened to formulate the Guidelines for National Unification and negotiations with the People's Republic of China began, discussing the "Three Links" (direct trade, postal, and transportation links).

On 1 April 1991, Foreign Minister Chien Fu first proposed the concept of "one China, two political entities" during a question-and-answer session in the Legislative Yuan. In 1992, the National Unification Council passed a resolution entitled "On the Meaning of 'One China'," clearly defining the connotation of "one China, two political entities." The resolution stated:

I. Both sides of the Taiwan Strait adhere to the "One China" principle, but their interpretations differ. The CCP authorities consider "One China" to be the "People's Republic of China," and after reunification, Taiwan will become a "Special Administrative Region" under its jurisdiction. Our side, however, believes that "One China" refers to the Republic of China established in 1912, whose sovereignty extends to the whole of China, but whose current jurisdiction only extends to Taiwan, Penghu, Kinmen, and Matsu. While Taiwan is indeed part of China, the mainland is also part of China.

Second, since 1949, China has been in a state of temporary division, with two political entities governing the two sides of the Taiwan Strait. This is an objective fact, and any claim to unification cannot ignore the existence of this fact.

Third, in order to achieve national development, national prosperity and the well-being of the people, the Republic of China government has formulated the "National Unification Program" and actively sought consensus and carried out steps toward unification; it is hoped that the mainland authorities can also be pragmatic and abandon prejudices with a realistic attitude, cooperate with each other, and contribute wisdom and strength to the establishment of a free, democratic and prosperous China.

In 1993, based on this theory, a proposal was submitted to the United Nations through friendly nations, hoping to participate in the UN under the name "Republic of China" or "Republic of China in Taiwan" through a "parallel representation of divided nations" approach. The "parallel representation of divided nations" concept originated from the German model. This proposal argued that both the Republic of China and the People's Republic of China were two countries that had separated from China and could share Chinese representation. The proposal was ultimately blocked by the People's Republic of China.

== The reaction of the People's Republic of China ==
On 27 August 1992, the Association for Relations Across the Taiwan Straits issued a statement explicitly opposing the Republic of China's "Proposal on the Meaning of 'One China'". The statement pointed out: "We disagree with the relevant Taiwanese authorities' understanding of the meaning of 'One China'. Our position of advocating 'peaceful reunification and one country, two systems' and opposing 'two Chinas, one China and one Taiwan, two equal political entities' is consistent."
