= Dual recognition =

Dual recognition is a special diplomatic policy in which a third country grants diplomatic recognition to two mutually exclusive or even hostile countries or political entities at the same time, effectively recognizing both countries as sovereign states in order to develop diplomatic relations with both sides simultaneously, but legally does not contradict the respective sovereignty claims of the two countries. occurs when the two countries have sovereignty disputes, especially when they are in a state of division. However, in order to expand international space, the two disputing countries must be able to accept giving up their "exclusive mandate" of each other and tacitly allow other countries to engage with each other to a certain extent. After the formation of diplomatic conventions and the reduction of hostility between the two sides, other countries can engage with these two countries in a normal diplomatic manner and move towards the normalization of diplomatic relations.

Historically, several countries in a state of division have implemented dual recognition, especially the division of the country caused by the confrontation between the two major camps during the Cold War, including East Germany and West Germany, South Vietnam and North Vietnam, and South Korea and North Korea, which have remained to this day. In the Chinese-speaking world, this proposition is common in the political circles of Taiwan, especially in the fields of diplomacy and cross-strait relations. Both sides of the Taiwan Strait have strongly opposed the dual recognition proposal put forward by the international community until the Republic of China government began to accept dual recognition after the 1990s. The People's Republic of China government has continued to adhere to its own one China principle and opposes it, and does not allow the Republic of China or Taiwan to create the idea of "two Chinas" or "one China, one Taiwan" in any international occasion. Therefore, the true dual recognition between the two regimes has not happened.

== History ==
=== Inner German relations ===
Following World War II, the Federal Republic of Germany (West Germany) was established on 23 May 1949. The German Democratic Republic (East Germany) was established on 7 October 1949. Neither side recognized the other's sovereignty and insisted that only it could truly represent Germany, as exemplified by West Germany's Hallstein Doctrine. East Germany, along with other Eastern European countries, formed the Eastern Bloc. In 1955, West Germany joined NATO, and East Germany joined the Warsaw Pact, leading to strained relations due to the Cold War.

In 1969, West German Chancellor Willy Brandt proposed the Ostpolitik, initiating normal relations with Eastern European countries and shifting the stance to "one nation, two regimes". The two Germanys signed the Basic Treaty in 1972, emphasizing the development of normal relations on the basis of equal rights, recognizing each as a sovereign state and stating that they could not represent each other in international affairs. In 1973, both Germanys joined the United Nations simultaneously with "parallel representation." Normal state relations continued between the two countries until German reunification in 1991.

=== North Vietnam–South Vietnam relations ===
At the end of World War II, the August Revolution led by Ho Chi Minh in 1945 established the Democratic Republic of Vietnam, declaring its independence from France. The First Indochina War began in 1946. In 1948, a French-backed Provisional Central Government of Vietnam, known as South Vietnam, was established. In 1949, it was reorganized into the State of Vietnam. In 1954, after France's defeat at the Battle of Dien Bien Phu, it withdrew from Vietnam. Following the Geneva Conference, North and South Vietnam agreed to separate their territories along the 17th parallel, forming two neutral countries. South Vietnam reorganized into the Republic of Vietnam in 1955, receiving support from the United States, the Republic of China (Taiwan), Thailand, and South Korea. That same year, North Vietnam sent troops south to wage a war of unification, marking the outbreak of the Vietnam War. In 1975, the Paris Peace Accords were signed, guaranteeing the separation of North and South Vietnam into two countries, with peaceful reunification to follow. After the US withdrawal from Vietnam, North Vietnam captured Saigon, the capital of South Vietnam, completing the reunification of Vietnam in 1976. In 1977, Vietnam joined the United Nations. Both North and South Vietnam achieved dual recognition through the Geneva Conference and the Paris Peace Agreement. However, this recognition was short-lived.

=== North Korea–South Korea relations ===
Following World War II, with the support of the United States and its allies, the Republic of Korea (ROK), commonly known as South Korea, was established on 15 August 1948, in the southern part of the Korean Peninsula. Meanwhile, the Democratic People's Republic of Korea (DPRK), supported by the Soviet Union, was established on 9 September 1948. In 1950, North Korean troops crossed the 38th parallel and launched an offensive southward, triggering the Korean War. With the support of the Soviet Union and China, and with the support of the United States and UN forces, South Korea was spared from collapse. The two sides finally signed the Korean Armistice Agreement at Panmunjom on 27 July 1953, achieving an armistice. The Korean Peninsula was divided in two, with the DPRK in the north (North Korea) and the ROK in the south (South Korea) both claiming sovereignty over the entire peninsula, enshrined in their respective constitutions, and engaging in mutual resistance.

In the early 1970s, with the easing of the Cold War, South Korea was the first to declare that it did not oppose participating in international organizations and joining the United Nations simultaneously with North Korea, effectively acknowledging the concept of "one nation, one country, two governments." In 1990, the Republic of Korea established diplomatic relations with the Soviet Union, while the Soviet Union and the Democratic People's Republic of Korea already had diplomatic relations, resulting in dual recognition. In 1991, the Democratic People's Republic of Korea and the Republic of Korea simultaneously joined the United Nations. Subsequently, countries including the People's Republic of China, the United Kingdom, and Malaysia adopted a dual recognition strategy, recognizing both Koreas.

== Cross-strait relations ==
After the end of World War II, China immediately experienced the continuation of the Chinese Civil War, which formed a political structure in which the Republic of China and the People's Republic of China ruled Taiwan and mainland China respectively across the Taiwan Strait. In the face of the current political situation across the Taiwan Strait, if dual recognition is achieved, third countries in the international community can establish diplomatic relations with these two countries at the same time. This diplomatic strategy references the German and Korean models and mainly hopes to resolve the controversy caused by the "One China" principle, which has led to the Republic of China and the People's Republic of China refusing to allow each other to participate in the international community at the same time.

Dual recognition schemes are divided into:

1. The dual representation scheme: simultaneously recognizing both the Republic of China and the People's Republic of China as having representation in China, thus forming "two Chinas".
2. The "One China, One Taiwan" solution: Only the People's Republic of China is recognized as the representative of China, while Taiwan is to completely separate from China and become an independent sovereign state through means such as Taiwan independence or ROC independence.

In the 1960s, the international community attempted to promote a dual recognition scheme between the two sides of the Taiwan Strait at the United Nations, accepting the membership of both countries. However, this scheme was rejected by both the Republic of China and the People's Republic of China for a long time. At the 21st session of the United Nations General Assembly in 1966, Italy and other countries proposed that the United Nations establish a special committee to study a dual representation recognition scheme based on the reality of political division. However, this proposal was strongly opposed by the Republic of China. As a result, even though the proposal had received public support from the United States and other Western countries for many years, it was still overwhelmingly rejected year after year under the mobilization of the two "China" regimes.

After the Lee Teng-hui administration came to power in the 1990s, the Republic of China adopted a "pragmatic diplomacy" policy, abandoning its insistence on Chinese representation and willing to pursue dual recognition. In contrast, the People's Republic of China, wielding significant influence in the international community, demands that all countries adhere to its one China principle and continues to oppose dual recognition. Therefore, dual recognition between the Republic of China and the People's Republic of China failed to become a stable diplomatic practice internationally.

=== Republic of China ===
Following the founding of the People's Republic of China in 1949 and the retreat of the Republic of China government to Taiwan, both the Kuomintang and the Chinese Communist Party maintained their respective claims as the sole legitimate representatives of China, refusing to recognize each other's legitimacy. In the early years after the relocation to Taiwan, the government still received diplomatic recognition primarily from the free world. In the 1960s, Western countries proposed dual recognition for both sides of the Taiwan Strait, but this failed due to opposition from both sides.

In the 1950s, major powers such as the United Kingdom and France successively recognized the People's Republic of China. Chiang Kai-shek's government took the initiative to sever diplomatic relations with countries that recognized and established diplomatic relations with Beijing. In the 1960s, the international situation changed, and more and more countries established diplomatic relations with Beijing. In addition, the deterioration of Sin-Soviet relations led to a qualitative change in Sino-US relations. Italy and the United States publicly promoted the "dual representation" plan for both sides of the Taiwan Strait to participate in the international community from the mid-1960s. This plan was not agreed to by the People's Republic of China and was severely criticized and opposed by Chiang Kai-shek's Kuomintang government, which called dual recognition "collusion with the bandits" and insisted that "Han and traitors cannot coexist" and rejected the US proposal. Although Taipei expressed its willingness to accept the "dual representation" plan to various countries in a low-key manner in 1971. However, due to the increasing number of countries supporting Beijing's accession to the United Nations, the United Nations "China" seat held by the Republic of China was finally replaced by the People's Republic of China in the same year by a resolution of the United Nations General Assembly. Subsequently, the Republic of China was forced to withdraw from all international organizations related to the United Nations. Most of its diplomatic allies severed ties and switched to establishing diplomatic relations with Beijing. Even its most important ally, the United States, switched to recognizing Beijing in 1979, leading to the Republic of China's diplomatic isolation. Beijing demanded that countries establishing diplomatic relations not only sever ties with the Republic of China but also express their support for the "One China" principle in diplomatic documents.

At the end of Chiang Ching-kuo's rule, when scholar Wei Yong was a researcher at the Hoover Institution in the United States in 1975, he proposed that a multi-system state and dual recognition could be promoted as a solution for Chinese unification. In January 1988, Chiang Ching-kuo passed away. After the February political struggle, Lee Teng-hui took over as President of the Republic of China. In March of that year, Wei Yong, then chairman of the Research, Development and Evaluation Commission, first proposed a diplomatic solution that could be modeled after East Germany and West Germany for dual recognition, as a transitional means before China's unification.

In 1990, South Korea successfully established diplomatic relations with the Soviet Union, achieving dual recognition with North Korea. In 1991, both South Korea and North Korea joined the United Nations. Influenced by this diplomatic breakthrough, the Government Information Office of the Executive Yuan placed an advertisement in The New York Times in 1991, declaring to the international community Taiwan's willingness to accept dual recognition. Calls for dual recognition and rejoining the United Nations also began to emerge in the Legislative Yuan. The first legislator to push for dual recognition and rejoining the UN was Huang Chu-wen of the Think Tank. Following the Think Tank, the Democratic Progressive Party (DPP) caucus in the Legislative Yuan also began pushing for dual recognition. This was opposed at the time by Foreign Minister Chiang Hsiao-yen, who believed it was impossible to succeed.

As the third wave of democratization swept the globe, the remaining allies who had been staunchly anti-communist in the past, such as South Korea and South Africa, all shifted their diplomatic stance and established diplomatic relations with the People's Republic of China. At that time, President Lee Teng-hui of the Republic of China promoted the "pragmatic diplomacy" approach. For the first time, the Republic of China government formally stated that it hoped that both sides of the Taiwan Strait would not deny each other as political entities and would engage in positive interactions, and would no longer reject the dual recognition scheme. However, Beijing believed that dual recognition would affect its assertion of sovereignty over Taiwan, and therefore, on the grounds of opposing Taiwan independence, it demanded that the international community restrain it.

After that, the PRC rejected any claims of "one China, one Taiwan" or "two Chinas", while the Taipei authorities became more open to dual recognition after several changes of ruling parties. During President Chen Shui-bian’s term, dual recognition was briefly promoted. The flexible diplomacy promoted during President Ma Ying-jeou’s term focused on improving relations with the People’s Republic of China. In order to avoid violating the one-China principle of the People’s Republic of China, President Ma Ying-jeou and Foreign Minister David Lin explicitly refused to accept dual recognition unless the People’s Republic of China was willing to accept it.

During President Tsai Ing-wen's administration, after severing diplomatic ties with Honduras, Deputy Foreign Minister Yu Ta-yi gave an interview to Argentine media in 2023, stating that Taiwan does not rule out exchanges with any country, which was seen as a declaration of willingness to accept dual recognition. Foreign Minister Wu Chao-hsieh later stated during a legislative interpellation that he would not rule out exchanges with any country willing to develop diplomatic relations with Taiwan, which was also interpreted by the media as promoting dual recognition, which aroused opposition from Kuomintang Chairman Eric Chu.

=== The issue of dual recognition of national status ===
Wei Yong's 1988 proposal argued that the Republic of China and the People's Republic of China were merely two political entities under the umbrella of China, and that dual recognition could be achieved without altering the national identity. This proposition, known as the "one China, two political entities" in the Guidelines for National Unification, drew upon the German Basic Treaty, hoping that the Republic of China and the People's Republic of China would first mutually recognize each other as sovereign and equal states. However, based on shared national sentiment, the Republic of China and the People's Republic of China would share the representation of China, thus forming two Chinas before moving towards Chinese unification.

In 1993, through diplomatic allies of the Republic of China (Taiwan), a proposal was submitted to the United Nations General Assembly to establish a special study committee to review, revoke, or amend Resolution 2758 adopted in 1971. Invoking the models of Germany and South Korea, it demanded that Taiwan rejoin the United Nations under the name "Republic of China" or "Republic of China in Taiwan," based on the principle of "parallel representation of divided nations." However, the proposal was blocked by the People's Republic of China.

In the same year, the Democratic Progressive Party (DPP) Legislative Yuan caucus, led by legislator Lin Cho-shui, proposed a constitutional interpretation bill, requesting the Grand Justices Conference to interpret the inherent territorial meaning of the Constitution of the Republic of China. The DPP argued that dual recognition could only be established if both sides of the Taiwan Strait were recognized as two equal countries. This argument is one China, one Taiwan or one country on each side.

=== People's Republic of China ===
After the People's Republic of China was established in 1949, its first foreign minister, Zhou Enlai, notified the United Nations in 1950 that the People's Republic of China was the representative of all the Chinese people and the sole legitimate government of China. He said the Republic of China and Chiang Kai-shek had no legal right to rule China and demanded that the United Nations immediately expel the representatives of the Republic of China. After the United Nations General Assembly Resolution 2758 in 1971, the People's Republic of China formally established the principle of a China and demanded that the international community recognize the People's Republic of China as the sole legitimate representative of China.

The People's Republic of China considers the Republic of China to have ceased to exist, and the existing Republic of China is merely a remnant of local power, not a nation. In 2005, the Anti-Secession Law was passed, opposing any attempt to separate Taiwan from the People's Republic of China and deeming such an act a crime. Diplomatic recognition of the Republic of China or Taiwan as having national status is considered an act of Taiwan independence that constitutes "two Chinas" or "one China, one Taiwan, " and the People's Republic of China opposes all such actions.
