= 2015 Xi–Chu meeting =

Cross-strait meeting between Xi Jinping and Eric Chu

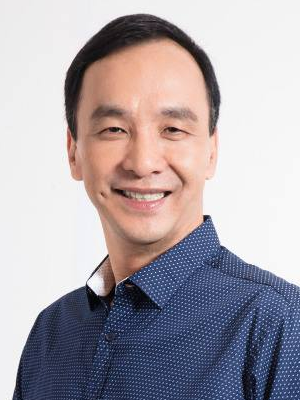
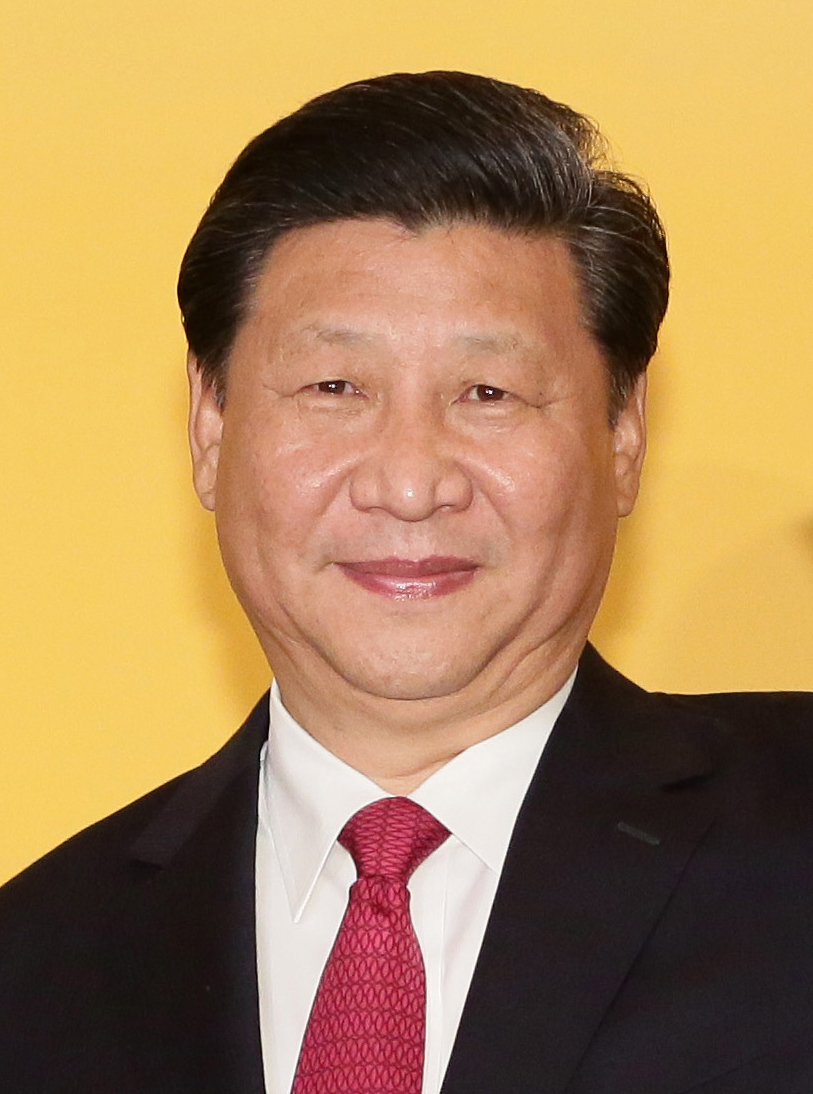
Eric Chu, the Chairman of Kuomintang (left), and Xi Jinping, the General Secretary of the Chinese Communist Party (right)

On May 4, 2015, General Secretary of the Chinese Communist Party Xi Jinping and Kuomintang (KMT) Chairman Eric Chu met in Beijing.

== Background ==
After Xi Jinping became the General Secretary of the Chinese Communist Party in November 2012, the KMT repeatedly proposed a potential meeting between Xi and Ma Ying-jeou, who served as Chairman of the Kuomintang from 2009 to 2014. Nothing came of the plans until 2015, when Chu was elected KMT chair.

== Timeline ==
=== Preparation ===
In January 2015, Eric Chu became the Chairman of the KMT. On March 11, 2015, Yang Wei-chung, the former KMT spokesman, was consulted about the Cross-Strait Economic, Trade, and Culture Forum, but details of the discussion were not publicly disclosed.

On April 12, 2015, Eric Chu confirmed that he would be attending the 10th Cross-Strait Economic, Trade, and Culture Forum, which was to be held in Shanghai on May 2–3, 2015, but the Xi-Chu meeting was not yet confirmed.

On April 24, 2015, Taiwan Affairs Office spokesman Ma Xiaoguang said that Chu and Xi would meet.

=== Chu's visit to Mainland China ===
==== Shanghai ====
On May 2, 2015, Eric Chu arrived at Shanghai Pudong International Airport and shook hands with the head of the Taiwan Affairs Office of the Chinese Communist Party Central Committee, Zhang Zhijun. That same day, Chu attended a Cross-Strait Economic, Trade, and Culture Forum held in Shanghai. He shook hands with Yu Zhengsheng, the chairman of the National Committee of the Chinese People's Political Consultative Conference. At this forum, Chu mentioned the Asian Infrastructure Investment Bank, a regional development bank led by the Chinese Government. Also, Chu visited Fudan University and delivered a speech.

==== Beijing ====
On May 4, 2015, Chu arrived in Beijing and met with Xi Jinping, the General Secretary of the CCP. Xi said that mainland China and Taiwan should settle political differences through consultation of the "One China" policy. Chu also said that the 1992 Consensus could be expanded to the international realm.

After meeting Xi, Chu delivered a speech at Peking University.

== Controversy ==
On May 4, 2015, the Associated Press reported on the Xi-Chu meeting. The report quoted Eric Chu as saying that his party supports "eventual unification". But the chair of the KMT's Culture and Communications Committee, Yang Wei-chung, said that the report was mistaken. After the KMT filed a complaint, the AP rescinded the report.

== See also ==
- 2005 Pan-Blue visits to mainland China
