= Future one China =

- Traditional Chinese: 未來的一個中國
- Simplified Chinese: 未来的一个中国
Transcriptions
Standard Mandarin
- Hanyu Pinyin: Wèilái de yīgè Zhōngguó

Abbreviation
- Traditional Chinese: 未來一中
- Simplified Chinese: 未来一中
Transcriptions
Standard Mandarin
- Hanyu Pinyin: Wèilái yī zhōng

Future one China is the interpretation of one China by President Chen Shui-bian of the Republic of China (ROC). This statement is derived from the development of two Chinas in stages and ultimate unification, and is used to solve the China problem. It argues that Taiwan and mainland China cannot sever their relationship in terms of history, culture, economy and other aspects, and that the core is Chinese culture. It posts that the current situation is that the two sides of the Taiwan Strait are divided and governed separately, but at some point in the future, the ROC and the People's Republic of China may become one China. The ROC hopes that the PRC will first abandon the threat of force and conduct exchanges with each other on the principle of democratic equality in order to deal with the issue of Chinese unification. It proposed that, in the future, China can be integrated through the European Union model and eventually form a single country.

Because the PRC government refused to give up the use of force to unify the country, it was unable to conduct further negotiations with the ROC. Scholar Chen Mingtong and Tsai Ing-wen, then the Mainland Affairs Council Chairperson, both believed that the policy ultimately considered to be failed.

== History ==
The concept of "future one China" originated from the 1971 RAND Corporation report, "Remaking China Policy", which advocated "One China, but not now." Under this policy, Taiwan is considered Chinese territory and will be unified with China in the future, but is not Chinese territory in the present situation.

In his inaugural address in 2000, President Chen Shui-bian proposed the Four Noes and One Without policy. In his speech, he said that he was willing to engage in dialogue with the People's Republic of China (PRC) on the principle of democratic equality and to discuss the issue of "future one China". Subsequently, a cross-party cross-strait group was formed to discuss this issue. Former legislator Lin Cho-shui of the Democratic Progressive Party (DPP) posted on Facebook in 2019 that he was a member of the cross-strait group at the time and had prevented the cross-strait group from including "future one China" in the consensus resolution.

In response to PRC's One China principle, in 2001, Lin Chung-pin, a spokesperson for the Mainland Affairs Council, proposed the policy of two Chinas that are not subordinate to each other, and said that he was willing to hold talks with the Chinese government under the ideal of future one China". In his 2004 presidential inaugural address, Chen Shui-bian reiterated that as long as the people of Taiwan agree, any future relationship between the Republic of China and the People's Republic of China or between Taiwan and mainland China, including the unification of China, is possible and will not be excluded. Chen Shui-bian believed that as long as the People's Republic of China abandoned the threat of force and respected the Republic of China's living space and international dignity, the two sides could start to integrate through culture and trade and establish a relationship of trust. As long as the four principles of “sovereignty, democracy, peace and equality” are met, the Republic of China and the People's Republic of China can carry out political integration through the European Union model and establish a new framework for permanent peace across the two sides. In a 2004 interview with Formosa Television, Chen Shui-bian said that before his inauguration in 2000, a powerful figure from the mainland asked him to propose in his inaugural speech that both sides of the Taiwan Strait are descendants of Yan and Huang, descendants of the dragon, and should work together to address the issue of one China in the future. After discussions with Lin Yi-hsiung, he revised it to one China in the future. This was also recorded in the "Interview with President Chen Shui-bian" published in 2024.

When Tsai Ing-wen, then the Mainland Affairs Council Chairperson, was questioned by the Legislative Yuan, she also expressed that as long as the People's Republic of China was willing to renounce the use of force and carry out democratic reforms, "future one China" would be the inevitable choice for Taiwan and mainland China. However, because mainland China refused to renounce the use of force for unification, this policy did not succeed. In the 2020 Taiwanese presidential election, the Kuomintang attacked Tsai Ing-wen for advocating the future of One China.
