= One China framework =

Chinese Communist Party policy

One China Framework (Chinese: 一个中国框架) is one of the policies of the Chinese Communist Party (CCP) and the People's Republic of China on the one China principle. It was first proposed by CCP General Secretary Hu Jintao in his "Six Points" speech in 2006, and was written into the work report of the 18th CCP National Congress in 2012, becoming the official national policy of the People's Republic of China. This statement is used as one of the interpretations of the 1992 Consensus, advocating that mainland China and Taiwan should conduct peaceful negotiations under the common position of one China to promote reunification.

The One China framework is considered to be a relatively moderate and flexible policy because it only mentions China and does not emphasize that the PRC is the sole legal representative of China, nor does it emphasize that Taiwan is a territory of the PRC. It only mentions that mainland China and Taiwan belong to the same China, which may leave room for ambiguous interpretation. Therefore, in addition to the PRC officialdom, politicians in Taiwan also use this term, represented by the Kuomintang. The Kuomintang often believes that the One China framework means that the PRC allows for one China, different interpretations, but this interpretation is considered by the PRC to be a malicious distortion, which believes that One China framework cannot be interpreted as the Republic of China representing China, or allowing the Republic of China to express itself as representing China.

== History ==
In 1993, the State Council of the People's Republic of China issued the white paper The Taiwan Issue and China's Reunification, which established the one-China principle, which states that "there is only one China in the world, the People's Republic of China is the only legitimate government representing China, and Taiwan is a part of China."

The term "One China framework" first appeared in 2006 when CCP General Secretary Hu Jintao delivered a speech entitled "Joining Hands to Promote the Peaceful Development of Cross-Strait Relations and Working Together to Achieve the Great Rejuvenation of the Chinese Nation". This speech is commonly known as "Hu's Six Points". In the speech, Hu Jintao emphasized that there is only one China in the world, namely the People's Republic of China. He said that since the founding of the People's Republic of China in 1949, mainland China and Taiwan still belong to one China. He stated although they have not yet been unified, China's territory and sovereignty have never been divided. He hoped that the two sides of the Taiwan Strait would form a common understanding on maintaining the one China framework, jointly oppose Taiwan independence separatist activities, and jointly pursue the unification of China under the principle of "one country, two systems" and peaceful negotiations. The one-China framework is rhetorically milder and more vague, but the official position of the People's Republic of China is that it is exactly the same as the one-China principle and is consistent with the position.

During the administration of President Ma Ying-jeou, the Legislative Yuan was repeatedly assured that it would not accept the One China framework. In 2015, Mainland Affairs Council Chairman Andrew Hsia also explained his position to legislators.

== Similar concepts ==
After the 1992 Hong Kong talks, the Straits Exchange Foundation and the Association for Relations Across the Taiwan Straits continued to coordinate their opinions via telegram. The Chinese Communist Party proposed that "as long as both sides of the Taiwan Strait recognize one China and have no disagreement on the future unification", as long as both sides recognize this premise, they can temporarily not discuss the actual connotation of "one China". The Taiwanese side expressed respect for these expressions, and the first chairman of the Straits Exchange Foundation, Koo Chen-fu, believed that the two sides had not reached a consensus.

After Tsai Ing-wen was elected President of the Republic of China, Wang Zaixi, former deputy director of the Taiwan Affairs Office, met in Beijing in 2016 with a youth delegation comprising students from 31 Taiwanese universities and colleges. During a closed-door meeting, he proposed the concept of "respective expressions of one China" (各表一中). He argued that describing the 1992 Consensus as one China with respective interpretations constituted a flawed distortion; the mainland side could not accept the notion that "one China" meant the Republic of China, and such phrasing violated the tacit understanding between the two sides, so the terminology should be shifted to "respective expressions of one China" instead. Wang Zaixhi proposed this phrase in 2016 to summarize the Chinese mainland's position in the 1992 Hong Kong talks, namely, "each side verbally expressed the consensus that both sides of the Taiwan Strait adhere to the one-China principle".

Former Vice President of the Republic of China Wu Den-yih believed and emphasized that the 1992 Consensus is "one China, each with its own interpretation" rather than "each with its own interpretation, one China", and that the result of the cross-strait exchange of notes is that "both sides of the strait adhere to the principle of one China, but as to its meaning, both sides agree to express it in verbal statements". However, this statement was also criticized by Sun Yangming, former deputy executive director of the Kuomintang think tank National Policy Foundation, as a distortion of history, making the situation more difficult to clarify.
