= Guidelines for National Unification =

The Guidelines for National Unification (Chinese: 國家統一綱領; pinyin: Guójiā Tǒngyī Gānglǐng), or the National Unification Guidelines (NUG), were written by the National Unification Council, an advisory body of the Republic of China government, regarding Chinese unification. The National Unification Guidelines were adopted by the Executive Yuan Council on February 23, 1991. The guidelines have a three-step process for the gradual unification of mainland China and Taiwan.

== Contents ==
The National Unification Guidelines endorses the One China policy before any other statements: "Both the mainland and Taiwan are parts of Chinese territory. Helping to bring about national unification should be the common responsibility of all Chinese people." However, the document emphasized that unification must "first respect the rights and interests of the people in the Taiwan area, and protect their security and welfare". A more radical earlier draft emphasized the "will", rather than the "rights", of the people in Taiwan, but this wording was changed at the insistence of ROC premier Hau Pei-tsun. The guidelines envisioned three stages that must be reached before planning unification:

1. Both sides would not "deny each other's existence" in the international community and would renounce the use of force or threats. The mainland should carry out political reforms.
2. The two sides would set up official communication channels "on equal footing" and help each other participate in international organizations. In return, Taiwan will help develop the mainland's economy and open up the Three Links of communication technology.
3. The two sides will establish an organization to plan the unification of a "democratic, free, and equitably prosperous China"

The NUG's demands that the PRC renounce the use of force, grant ROC political equality to itself, and let the ROC participate in international organizations, while offering little from Taiwan in return, sharply contradicted the unification proposals from mainland China. Additionally, the requirement for a "free, democratic" China to even consider unification precluded negotiations with the Chinese Communist Party currently in power on the mainland. In practice, the unrealistic goals for unification set by the NUG furthered the goals of Taiwanization of the ROC and the One Country on Each Side political culture in Taiwan. Nonetheless, in diplomatic terms the affirmation of the One China principle on the Taiwan side made the 1992 Consensus and the Wang-Koo Talks possible.

== Abrogation ==
As part of the Four Noes and One Without pledge, President Chen Shui-bian had promised not to formally abolish the National Unification Guidelines or the National Unification Council despite his party's supportive stance on Taiwan independence. In his Chinese New Year address on January 29, 2006, President Chen Shui-bian proposed abolishing the National Unification Guidelines and the National Unification Council. On February 27, 2006, Chen formally announced that the guideline would "cease to apply" and the council would "cease to function". The United States initially warned Chen not to abolish either the council or the guidelines, but later refused to condemn him because it believed the absence of the term "abolish" was not a breach of the status quo. However, Chen was widely condemned by the People's Republic of China, which warned that Chen "would bring disaster to Taiwan society." The Pan-Blue Coalition also condemned the move as unnecessarily provocative, arguing that Chen needed to focus on economic issues in the face of a growing unemployment and suicide rate, and some legislators started a petition to have Chen impeached. Chen defended his action as a response to the military threat from mainland China. Without the legal constraints of the NUG, Chen's successor, President Ma Ying-jeou, has been able to usher in an era of unprecedented exchanges between mainland China and Taiwan since 2008.

== See also ==
- Political status of Taiwan
