= Resolution on Taiwan's Future =

- Traditional Chinese: 台灣前途決議文
- Simplified Chinese: 台湾前途决议文
Transcriptions
Standard Mandarin
- Hanyu Pinyin: Táiwān qiántú juéyìwén
- Wade–Giles: T'ai²-wan¹ ch'ien²-t'u² chüeh²-i⁴-wen²
Southern Min
- Hokkien POJ: Tâi-oân Chiân-tô͘ Koat-gī-bûn

The Resolution on Taiwan's Future (Chinese: 台灣前途決議文) is a document ratified by the Democratic Progressive Party (DPP) during its eighth annual national assembly on May 7–8, 1999 in the southern port-city of Kaohsiung. It signifies a milestone of the position of the DPP toward Taiwan's future, and is the source of principles of the Government of the Republic of China under the rule of the DPP.

== Development ==
On 20 October 2001, the DPP passed a resolution elevating the status of the "1999 resolution regarding Taiwan's future" – in other words an attempt at making this resolution technically replace the DPP party charter's "Taiwan independence clause."

== See also ==
- Cross-Strait relations
- Four-Stage Theory of the Republic of China
- Political status of Taiwan
- Taiwanese nationalism
- Taiwan independence movement
- Two sides of the Taiwan Strait are not subordinate to each other
