= One China with respective interpretations =

Idea in China–Taiwan relations

- Traditional Chinese: 一個中國各自表述
- Simplified Chinese: 一个中国各自表述
Transcriptions
Standard Mandarin
- Hanyu Pinyin: Yīgè Zhōngguó gèzì biǎoshù
- Wade–Giles: I^{1}ko^{5} Chung^{1}kuo^{2}, ko^{4}tzŭ^{4} piao^{3}shu^{4}

One China with respective interpretations (Chinese: 一中各表; pinyin: Yīzhōng Gèbiǎo; Wade–Giles: I^{1}-chung^{1} Ko^{4}-piao^{3}) or one China, different interpretations is one of the discourses on cross-strait relations, proposed by the Kuomintang (KMT). It originated from the Kuomintang-led Republic of China's Guidelines for National Unification Program, which argued that the two sides of the Taiwan Strait are one China and two political entities, and that the Republic of China and the People's Republic of China can each express their own representation of China. "One China with respective interpretations" was not accepted by the Chinese Communist Party (CCP)-led People's Republic of China, which considered it insufficient to reflect the spirit of "the two sides of the Taiwan Strait jointly seeking national unification" (两岸共同谋求国家统一).

After 2000, this statement was often replaced by the term "1992 Consensus, with the KMT using the "One China with respective interpretations" as the basis for its assertion of the 1992 Consensus. China has repeatedly claimed that the 1992 Consensus should not only be interpreted as the "One China with respective interpretations" but also includes the requirement that “both sides of the Taiwan Strait work together to seek national unification".

== History ==
On August 1, 1992, the National Unification Council of the ROC made a resolution on the meaning of "One China", stating:

Both sides of the Taiwan Strait adhere to the principle of One China, but the meanings given to it by the two sides are different. The Chinese Communist authorities believe that one China means the People's Republic of China, and that after reunification, Taiwan will become a special administrative region under their jurisdiction. The Taiwanese side, on the other hand, believes that one China should refer to the Republic of China (ROC), which was founded in 1912 and whose sovereignty extends to the whole of China, but whose jurisdiction at present extends only to Taiwan, Penghu, and Jinma. Taiwan is certainly a part of China, but the mainland is also a part of China.

On June 20, 2000, after assuming the presidency, Chen Shui-bian said in his first international press conference:

If there is a "consensus", it should be the "verbal expression of each side of the one China", but the other side of the Taiwan Strait thinks that there is no such consensus, so if there is a "consensus", it is a "consensus" without consensus. Therefore, if there is a "consensus", it is a "consensus" without consensus, the so-called "AGREE TO DISAGREE".

The phrase "both sides recognize that there is only one China, but agree to differ on its definition" has been interpreted by the Ma Ying-jeou administration in ROC as "One China with respective interpretations". In 2015, President Ma Ying-jeou of the ROC stated that the China in "One China with respective interpretations" refers to the ROC.

In 2016, Taiwanese singer Tzuyu raised the flag of the Republic of China, which was reported by Huang An as supporting Taiwan independence, as the Tzuyu Flag Incident. Tzuyu later released a film apologizing and claiming to be 'Chinese'. Jason Hu, the main committee member of the KMT presidential candidate's campaign headquarters, considered Tzuyu, who was born in Taiwan, holding the flag of the Republic of China to be a typical example of the One China with respective interpretations.

== See also ==
- Mutual non-recognition of sovereignty and mutual non-denial of authority to govern
