= National Unification Council =

Defunct Taiwanese agency

National Unification Council Republic of China
- 國家統一委員會; Guójiā tǒngyī wěiyuánhuì

Agency overview
- Formed: October 7, 1990
- Dissolved: February 27, 2006
- Jurisdiction: Republic of China
- Parent agency: Office of the President of the Republic of China

National Unification Council
- Traditional Chinese: 國家統一委員會
- Simplified Chinese: 国家统一委员会
Transcriptions
Standard Mandarin
- Hanyu Pinyin: Guójiā Tǒngyī Wěiyuánhuì

The National Unification Council was a nonstatutory governmental agency of the Republic of China on Taiwan established on 7 October 1990. Now defunct, its formal aim was to promote the reintegration of mainland China into the Republic of China.

In February 1991, the council drafted the Guidelines for National Unification, which outlined a three-phase approach for Chinese unification. The Guidelines called for the People's Republic of China to democratize and become more developed as the precondition for serious talks about steps toward eventual unification.

The council was suspended and ceased to function in early 2006 during the presidency of Chen Shui-bian, a member of the Democratic Progressive Party which has generally promoted Taiwanese nationalism.

== Establishment ==
The National Unification Council was established under the direct oversight of the Office of the President by then-President Lee Teng-hui. It first met on 7 October 1990, with 30 members. Membership extended to government officials, political party leaders, industrialists, civic leaders, scholars and journalists. The National Unification Council held 14 meetings from its founding to 8 April 1999.

In February 1991, the council drafted the Guidelines for National Unification, which outlined a three-phase approach for Chinese unification. The Guidelines called for Beijing to democratize and become more developed as the precondition for serious talks about steps toward eventual integration. The guidelines stipulate that "both the mainland and Taiwan areas are parts of Chinese territory. Helping to bring about national unification should be the common responsibility of all Chinese people."

On 1 August 1992, the NUC passed the "Definition of One China Resolution," stating: "The two sides of the Taiwan Strait uphold the One China principle, but the interpretations of the two sides are different ... Our side believes that one China should mean the Republic of China, established in 1912 and existing today, and its sovereignty extends throughout China, but its current governing authority is only over Taiwan, Penghu, Kinmen, and Matzu. Admittedly, Taiwan is part of China, but the mainland is also a part of China." This would later develop into the 1992 Consensus.

== Abolition ==
The council had already been out of operation under the administration of Chen Shui-bian since 2000, who has leaned towards Taiwanese independence and opposed Chinese unification. At the same time, in his "Four Noes and One Without" policy, Chen promised not to formally abolish the council or the Guidelines for National Unification, in order to allay international concern about his possible moves toward declaring independence.

In his lunar new year speech in 2006 President Chen Shui-bian instructed the Democratic Progressive Party to begin formal debate on the permanent abolition of the National Unification Council and the guidelines set out therein. On 27 February 2006, Chen formally announced that the council would "cease to function" and its guidelines would "cease to apply". President Chen Shui-bian declared that the Guidelines for National Unification had "ceased to apply" because they had been drawn up by an ad hoc presidential commission in the days before citizens had the right to elect their leader and make their voices effectively heard. Moreover, the framers of the guidelines had premised them on a "one-China principle" and the presumption of eventual unification without consulting the people of Taiwan.

The council was suspended in early 2006, with President Chen Shui-bian remarking:

"The National Unification Council will cease to function. No budget will be ear-marked for it and its personnel must return to their original posts...The National Unification Guidelines will cease to apply. In accordance with procedures, this decision will be transmitted to the Executive Yuan for notice."

Chen had previously called for the NUC to be "abolished" but later toned this down to "cease to function". The government was ambiguous on whether "cease to function" was the same as "abolish".

There have been calls for President Ma Ying-jeou to reinstate the National Unification Council, with Taiwan newspaper The China Post remarking in a commentary:

The best and easiest way to show his sincerity is to reinstate the National Unification Council made to cease to function by President Chen. Or to sign a peace accord with Hu Jintao, General Secretary of the Chinese Communist Party.

No plans for the NUC's revival had been planned, but the DPP would later return to presidency in 2016 under Tsai Ing-wen and later, Lai Ching-te.

== See also ==
- Cross-Strait relations
- Political status of Taiwan
- Mainland Affairs Council, Republic of China
- Taiwan Affairs Office, People's Republic of China

=== Similar agencies ===
- Ministry of Unification, Republic of Korea
- Committee for the Peaceful Reunification of the Fatherland, Democratic People's Republic of Korea (disbanded in 2024)
- Minister of Intra-German Relations, Federal Republic of Germany prior to 1990
- State Ministry for Reconciliation and Civic Equality, Georgia
- Ministry of Temporarily Occupied Territories and IDPs, Ukraine
