= Four Noes and One Without =

2000 pledge by Chen Shui-bian

The Four Noes and One Without (simplified Chinese: 四不一没有; traditional Chinese: 四不一沒有; pinyin: sì bù, yī méiyǒu; Pe̍h-ōe-jī: Sù Put It Bu̍t-iú), also known as the Four Noes (Chinese: 四不; pinyin: sì bù) was a pledge by former President of the Republic of China Chen Shui-bian made in his inauguration speech on 20 May 2000, concerning the political status of Taiwan. It was an important part of cross-straits relations.

The pledge was that, provided the People's Republic of China has no intention to use military force against Taiwan, Chen's administration would not:

- declare Taiwan independence,
- change the national title from "the Republic of China" to "the Republic of Taiwan",
- include the doctrine of special state-to-state relations in the Constitution of the Republic of China, or
- promote a referendum on unification or independence.

In addition, the "One Without" was that Chen's administration would not abolish the National Unification Council (later abolished in 2006) or the National Unification Guidelines though during his administration the National Unification Council met only once. On February 27, 2006, the Council ceased to function in tandem with the elimination of its already meager budget. Chen said that his decision did not change the status quo in the Taiwan Strait, but instead returned sovereignty to the people of Taiwan.

The Four Noes and One Without were an important part of Taiwan–United States relations. Several times, Chen had to reassure the United States that the Four Noes and One Without policy had not been abolished and that he was not attempting to circumvent the pledge via any loopholes. The phrase that the United States used with regard to the policy of "Four Noes and One Without" was that the United States "appreciate[d] Chen's pledge and t[ook] it very seriously."

== Policy revision ==
On 27 February 2006, Chen dismantled the National Unification Council and Guidelines saying they "will cease functioning and the budget no longer be appropriated", effectively breaking the promises made in 2000 if 'cease functioning' is considered to be synonymous with 'abolishing'. However, as the People's Republic of China has threatened to use military force against Taiwan by passing the Anti-Secession Law in March 2005 and continuing the buildup of missiles opposite the Taiwan Strait, the no intent of aggression provision may have long been violated. It is noteworthy that the 2004 referendum called by President Chen Shui-bian held in tandem with the presidential election used the 'emergent threat' stipulation in Taiwan's Referendum Law, thereby implying the provision had already been breached by China's imminent threat and missile buildup. Nevertheless, this move drew sharp rebuke from the United States, with the State Department insisting that the Taiwanese government clarify that the National Unification Council has not been abolished. However, in a TV interview days later, Chen stated that 'ceasing to function' is the same as having been 'abolished'.

In the week prior, he told U.S. Congressman Rob Simmons (R-CT) that the Council and Guidelines were "absurd products of an absurd era." Chen revealed he planned to draft a new constitution, which many conjectured would be pro-separatist, before he stepped down in 2008.

The Four Noes and One Without policy was officially replaced by Four Wants and One Without policy in 2007, which is essentially the opposite of the original Four Noes and One Without policy.

When Tsai Ing-wen became president in 2016, she announced what has been called a New Four Noes policy: "our pledges will not change, and our goodwill will not change; but we will not bow to pressure, and we will of course not revert to the old path of confrontation".

== Criticism ==
Koo Kwang-ming and other pro-independence leaders openly criticized that Chen, as president, is "not constitutionally authorized" and has "no legal power" to confine Taiwanese political future and freedom with the pledge. In addition, some of Chen's supporters such as Vice-president Annette Lu have suggested that the pledge may have loopholes such as the definition of military force. Furthermore, while the pledge stated that Chen would not support a referendum, some have suggested that it does not exclude the possibility of a referendum occurring by citizen initiative. The possibility of loopholes has occasionally led to considerable unease in Beijing and in Washington, D.C.

Under strong objection from pro-independence leaders and his supporters, who threatened to walk out the inauguration ceremony immediately once the pledge was recited, Chen did not explicitly repeat this pledge in his 2004 inauguration speech after his re-election though he alluded to the pledge by stating that the assurances he had given in the 2000 inaugural address remained in effect, and he has stated many times that the pledge remains in effect.

== See also ==
- Three Noes
- One Country on Each Side
- Politics of Taiwan
- Mutual non-recognition of sovereignty and mutual non-denial of authority to govern
