= 1992 Consensus =

Notion in the relations across the Strait of Taiwan

- Traditional Chinese: 九二共識
- Simplified Chinese: 九二共识
- Literal meaning: Nine-Two Consensus
Transcriptions
Standard Mandarin
- Hanyu Pinyin: Jiǔ-Èr Gòngshí
- Wade–Giles: Chiu³-Êrh⁴ Kung⁴-shih²
Yue: Cantonese
- Jyutping: gau2 ji6 gung6 sik1
Southern Min
- Hokkien POJ: Kiú-jī Kiōng-sek

The 1992 Consensus is a political term referring to the alleged outcome of a meeting in 1992 between the semi-official representatives of the Chinese Communist Party (CCP)-led People's Republic of China (PRC) in mainland China and the Kuomintang (KMT)-led Republic of China (ROC) on Taiwan. The consensus is often credited with establishing a diplomatic foundation for semi-official cross-strait exchanges beginning in the early 1990s and accepting it is a precondition set by the PRC for engaging in cross-strait dialogue.

Whether the meetings truly resulted in a consensus is disputed within the ROC. There was never any formal agreement or declaration on both sides acknowledging the "consensus". The KMT understanding of the consensus is "one China, different interpretations" (一中各表, 一個中國各自表述), i.e. that the ROC and PRC "agree" that there is One China, but disagree about what "China" means (i.e. ROC vs. PRC). The PRC's position is that there is one China (including Taiwan), of which the PRC is the sole legitimate representative, and does not formally acknowledge the term "with differing interpretations", repeatedly omitting the phrase in official documents. It views the 1992 Consensus as meaning "both sides of the strait belong to one China and will make joint efforts to seek national reunification". This discrepancy has been criticized by Taiwan's pro-independence Democratic Progressive Party (DPP), which has been the ruling party since 2016. The DPP has stated that the meetings never truly achieved any "consensus," therefore never acknowledged its existence and also rejects any claim that both sides of the Taiwan Strait are "One China."

Despite political divisions in Taiwan, the Constitution of the Republic of China still reflects the original Kuomintang-era position that both Taiwan and mainland China are part of one China under the government of the Republic of China. This constitutional framework has not been formally amended and stands in contrast to the Democratic Progressive Party's Taiwan-centered policy, which regards Taiwan and the mainland as separate entities, but it also contradicts the PRC's interpretation of the consensus who claim itself as the sole legitimate government of the whole of China and conflating it with the one China principle. Critics contend that the term "1992 Consensus" was not actually used at the time of the 1992 meeting. Instead, it was coined later, in April 2000 by Su Chi, a former National Security Council secretary-general. Former ROC President Lee Teng-hui, a Kuomintang (KMT) leader during his 1988–2000 term, expressed skepticism about the 1992 Consensus in 2006. Later, Democratic Progressive Party (DPP) President Tsai Ing-wen, who served from 2016 to 2024, criticized the consensus in a January 2019 speech, associating it with the PRC's "one country, two systems" framework.

== History ==
=== 1992–1999: Lee presidency ===
On 1 August 1992, the ROC's National Unification Council passed the "Definition of One China Resolution," stating: "The two sides of the Taiwan Strait uphold the One China principle, but the interpretations of the two sides are different ... Our side believes that one China should mean the Republic of China, established in 1912 and existing today, and its sovereignty extends throughout China, but its current governing authority is only over Taiwan, Penghu, Kinmen, and Matzu. Admittedly, Taiwan is part of China, but the mainland is also a part of China." This resolution provided the basis for a series of talks between the Association for Relations Across the Taiwan Strait (ARATS) of the People's Republic of China (PRC) and the Straits Exchange Foundation (SEF) of the Republic of China (ROC). In November 1992, a meeting between ARATS and SEF occurred in British Hong Kong. At the time of the meeting, Hong Kong was under British rule and therefore considered neutral territory by both sides. The conclusion they reached was intended as a means of side-stepping the conflict over the political status of Taiwan. On 1 November 1992, SEF issued a press release stating that "each side expresses its own interpretation verbally in order to solve this sticky problem of [One China] and thereby reaffirmed the August 1st NUC resolution as SEF's interpretation of One China."

ARATS telephoned SEF and stated that it "fully respected and accepted" Taipei's proposal to use verbal declarations for each side's position on this issue. On 16 November, ARATS sent a letter to SEF formally confirming that position and stating, "both sides of the strait uphold the principle of one China, and actively seek national unification, but the political interpretation of the one China will not be referred to in the cross-strait negotiations on functional issues." As a result of the 1992 meeting, ARATS Chairman Wang Daohan and SEF Chairman Koo Chen-fu met in Singapore on 27 April 1993, in what became known as the Wang-Koo summit. They concluded agreements on document authentication, postal transfers, and a schedule for future ARATS-SEF meetings. Talks were delayed as tensions rose in the Third Taiwan Strait Crisis, but in October 1998 a second round of Wang-Koo summit were held in Shanghai. Wang and Koo agreed to meet again in Taiwan in the autumn of 1999, but the meeting was called off by the PRC side when then President Lee Teng-hui proposed his Two-states Theory of "special state-to-state relations". After Lee began a more independence-oriented policy in the mid-1990s, the PRC began describing "one China, respective interpretations" as a "deliberate distortion" used by independence advocates as a "disguise" for either "two Chinas" or Taiwan's formal separation.

=== 2000–2008: Chen presidency ===
The leader of the liberal Democratic Progressive Party (DPP), Chen Shui-bian made his famous Four Noes and One Without proposal during his campaign in the presidential election in 2000. The proposal did not directly include the 1992 Consensus, but showed an intention to maintain the ambiguous status quo, which reflected largely the idea of the Consensus. The election ended with the first president-elected from the opposition party, and led to a shift of foreign policy. Chen's victory in 2000 prompted former SEF official Su Chi to coin the term "1992 Consensus" in order to capture the broadest consensus between different parties in Taiwan over the outcome of the 1992 meeting. Chen initially expressed some willingness to accept the 1992 Consensus, a precondition set by the PRC for dialogue, but backed down after backlash within his own party.

During his presidency, Chen made different statements about the ambiguous status quo and his policy towards PRC, but the government of PRC generally did not echo any of his speech. Despite the frozen atmosphere between the governments from the two sides of the strait, business and economic interactions thrived in Chen's presidency. In 2005, the 1992 Consensus was invoked by the opposition parties who controlled the parliament. Lien Chan, the chairman of the largest opposition party KMT and James Soong, chairman of another opposition party People First Party (PFP), made separate trips to mainland China to conduct their party-to-party dialog separately with the ruling Chinese Communist Party (CCP) across the strait. Both leaders explicitly endorsed the 1992 Consensus. However, no relevant legislation was made in the parliament for the result of the dialogues.

=== 2008–2016: Ma presidency ===
The election of Ma Ying-jeou to the presidential office and the victory of KMT in the parliament election saw both sides of the Taiwan strait moving closer. In his inauguration speech on 20 May 2008, Ma stated that both sides of the strait reached a consensus in 1992, which saw "one China with different interpretations" and the ROC would resume talks with the PRC as soon as possible based on the 1992 Consensus. In 2008, CCP invited the chairman of KMT, Wu Po-hsiung, to engage in an interparty dialog in Beijing where Wu met the General Secretary of the Chinese Communist Party, Hu Jintao on 28 May. After the meeting, the state news agency Xinhua reported that participants in the meeting declared that both sides across the strait will lay aside disputes, and work for a win-win situation on the basis of the 1992 Consensus. The semi-governmental dialog between the SEF from Taiwan and the ARATS from China was scheduled to re-open on the basis of the 1992 Consensus, with the first meeting held in June. The first priority for the SEF-ARATS meeting was the establishments of the three links, especially direct flights between mainland China and Taiwan. On 4 July 2008, Weekend direct chartered flights between mainland China and Taiwan commenced subsequent to the semi-official talk in Beijing.

In an interview by the Mexico-based newspaper El Sol de México on 2 September 2008, Ma was asked about his views on the subject of "two Chinas" and if there is a solution for the sovereignty issues between the two. The ROC President replied that the relations are not between two sovereign states, not between "two Chinas". "It is a special relationship", he said. Ma also stated that the sovereignty issues between the two cannot be resolved at present, and then quoted the 1992 Consensus, as a temporary measure until a solution becomes available. The spokesman for the ROC Presidential Office Wang Yu-chi later clarified the President's statement and said that the relations are between two regions of one country, based on the context of ROC Constitution, the Act Governing Relations between the People of the Taiwan Area and the Mainland Area and the 1992 Consensus.

CCP and its leader Hu did not evaluate any new meaning of the Consensus from the other side of the strait. A phone call between the heads of state of China and United States, the most important ally of Taiwan, occurred in 2008. The English website of Xinhua reported that Hu Jintao told President George W. Bush that it is PRC's "consistent stand that the Chinese Mainland and Taiwan should restore consultation and talks on the basis of the 1992 Consensus, which sees both sides recognize there is only one China, but agree to differ on its definition". The Chinese version of the same agency only mentioned that the resumption of the talks should be on the basis of the 1992 Consensus without expanding into the meaning of the Consensus. On 12 January 2011, Xinhua reiterated Beijing's position on this issue by saying that "under which both sides adhere to the One-China Principle", which is a highlight of the first half of the Consensus. During the cross-strait summit in 2015, the Consensus was stressed by both Ma and Xi Jinping, the successor of Hu Jintao. During the meetings, Ma brought up the second half of the Consensus "different interpretations of one China" in front of the leader of China, but Xi made no remarkable response.

In August 2011, DPP chair Tsai Ing-wen began to use the term "Taiwan consensus" after she disclosed the point "National Security Strategy and the development of cross-strait trade" (Chinese: 國家安全戰略篇與兩岸經貿發展篇) at the "ten years platform" (Chinese: 十年政綱). Tsai used the term to compete with Ma Ying-jeou's political views for the 2012 Taiwanese presidential election.

=== 2016–2024: Tsai presidency ===
In her 2016 campaign, Tsai Ing-wen did not challenge the 1992 consensus, but did not explicitly accept it either, referring instead to "existing realities and political foundations". After Tsai's victory in the presidential election of Taiwan, CCP general secretary Xi Jinping stated on 12 March 2016, that the 1992 Consensus was "the greatest common denominator and political bottom line for the peaceful development of cross-strait relations". On 2 January 2019, Xi Jinping marked the 40th Anniversary message to Taiwan compatriots with a long speech calling for the adherence to the 1992 Consensus and vigorously opposing Taiwanese independence. He said the political resolution of the Taiwan issue will be the formula used in Hong Kong and Macau, the one country, two systems.

The ROC President, Tsai Ing-wen responded to Xi's speech the same day. She stated that "the Beijing authorities' definition of the '1992 Consensus' is 'one China' and 'one country, two systems'", and that "we have never accepted the '1992 Consensus.'" Tsai later called for the PRC to conduct negotiations with the Taiwanese government to resolve the political status of Taiwan rather than engage in political consultations with individual Taiwanese political parties to advance their reunification goals. A January 2020 piece in The Diplomat noted that the CCP, KMT, and DPP were all currently challenging their own conceptions of the 1992 consensus.

A task force convened by the Kuomintang's reform committee issued new guidelines on cross-strait relations in June 2020. The task force found that public trust in the consensus had declined due to the actions of Beijing and DPP. The consensus was described as "a historical description of past cross-strait interaction," and the task force proposed that the consensus be replaced with a commitment to "upholding the Republic of China's national sovereignty; safeguarding freedom, democracy and human rights; prioritizing the safety of Taiwan; and creating win-win cross-strait relations." Following the landslide defeat of the KMT in the 2020 Taiwanese presidential election, some commentators speculated that the KMT would remove the 1992 Consensus from the party platform due to its associations with "one country, two systems". However, KMT chairman Johnny Chiang ultimately kept the 1992 Consensus. However, he rejected the "one country, two systems" as a feasible model for Taiwan. In 2021, the Taiwan Affairs Office stated that the meaning of the 1992 consensus is "both sides of the strait belong to one China, and work together to strive for national unification". The KMT platform under newly elected chairman Eric Chu also continued to include the 1992 consensus while rejecting "one country, two systems". In 2022, Chu called the 1992 Consensus a "'no consensus' consensus."

== Interpretations ==
=== Kuomintang ===
The KMT understanding of the consensus is "one China, different interpretations" (一中各表, 一個中國各自表述), i.e. that the ROC and PRC "agree" that there is One China, but disagree about what "China" means (i.e. ROC vs. PRC). The ambiguity of the 1992 Consensus allows the PRC to claim that both sides of the strait uphold the integrity of one China. On the other side, the same ambiguity allows the ROC to emphasize that it is the only China to which both the mainland and Taiwan belong. This facilitated the development of cross-strait relations in the early 1990s.

=== Democratic Progressive Party ===
This discrepancy has been criticized by Taiwan's pro-independence Democratic Progressive Party (DPP), which has been the ruling party since 2016. The DPP has pointed out that the meetings never truly achieved any "consensus," therefore never acknowledged its existence and also rejects any claim that both sides of the Taiwan Strait are "One China." Tsai believes that the 1992 consensus is solely based on the One-China policy and the desire to preserve it. The DPP further states, that a "consensus" among the Taiwanese people about the "1992 consensus" does not exist. The DPP hopes to get a Taiwan consensus (a consensus amongst the people) to displace the 1992 consensus, which would be ratified by legislation and a referendum. This new consensus should then form the basis for negotiations with the PRC. Tsai states further that the Taiwan consensus "is not an ordinary problem to be decided by majority", "is not an ordinary legislation or public issue" and "not even a purely domestic problem." Because Taiwan is domestically not united with China and has no consensus on the direction towards China, the Taiwanese government has no basis for negotiations with China. She hopes, that through democratic processes and the Legislative Yuan "with all different political views [we] can find common ground", "[because] that is the true spirit of the Taiwan consensus".

=== Chinese Communist Party ===
The PRC's position is that there is one China (including Taiwan), of which the PRC is the sole legitimate representative, and does not formally acknowledge the term "with differing interpretations", repeatedly omitting the phrase in official documents. This was seized upon by critics that the "consensus" was merely a one-sided deal by the KMT. The CCP also rejected any dialogue with any government or party in power that do not accept this "consensus". At the Conference of Global Overseas Chinese for Promoting the Peaceful Reunification of China on 27 August 2022, commemorating the 30th anniversary of the 1992 Consensus, Chinese People's Political Consultative Conference National Committee Chairman Wang Yang gave a speech, stating:

The core idea of the “1992 Consensus” is that “the two sides of the strait belong to one China, [and both must] commonly strive for national reunification.” The historical significance of the “1992 Consensus” lies in the fact that it laid the political foundation for the development of cross-Strait relations. It is only with this political foundation that we are able to open up cross-Strait consultations and negotiations, move forward with cross-Strait exchanges [between] political parties, and establish institutionalized cross-Strait mechanisms for consultation and contacts between the two sides. The practice of the past 30 years has enlightened us that the “One-China Principle” is [fundamental] for peace and stability in the Taiwan Strait and the peaceful development of cross-Strait relations. The reason why the “1992 Consensus” is important is that it has clearly defined the fundamental nature of cross-Strait relations: that the mainland and Taiwan belong to the same China, [and] the two sides of the strait [do not represent] state-to-state relations, [and neither are they] “one China, one Taiwan.”

Wang added that "It is only with this political foundation that Taiwan’s participation in the World Health Assembly, the International Civil Aviation Conference, and the activities of other such international organizations could be fair and reasonably arranged".

== Controversies ==
Some pro-independence supporters, such as former President Lee Teng-hui, point to a lack of documentation to contend that the consensus has never existed. Later, Democratic Progressive Party (DPP) President Tsai Ing-wen, who served from 2016 to 2024, criticized the consensus in a January 2019 speech, associating it with the PRC's "one country, two systems" framework.

According to Raymond Burghardt, the chair of the American Institute in Taiwan, the United States representative office in Taiwan:

"[There was] some language [in the faxes] that overlapped and some language that differed." Then Taiwan and China agreed to conduct dialog based on their statements written in those faxes. "That's what happened. Nothing more or nothing less," Burghardt said, adding that the KMT called this the '1992 Consensus', which was to some extent "confusing and misleading. To me, I'm not sure why you could call that a consensus."

== Public opinion ==
=== Taiwan ===
In 2018, academics conducted a survey in Taiwan to assess Taiwanese understanding of the 1992 Consensus. They gave respondents four possible meanings of the consensus:

Historic: On international affairs, both ROC and PRC claim to represent the whole Chinese people including both mainland and Taiwan.
KMT definition: ROC represents Taiwan, PRC represents the mainland, the two governments belong to the same country waiting for unification.
Incorrect: ROC represents Taiwan, PRC represents the mainland, the two governments belong to two different countries.
PRC definition: PRC represents the whole Chinese people including both mainland and Taiwan, and ROC is the local government.

They found that 34% chose the KMT's definition (which was acceptable to 48%), 33% chose the incorrect definition (acceptable to 75%), 17% chose the historic relationship (acceptable to 40%), and 5% chose the PRC definition (acceptable to 10%), and 11% did not respond. Scholarly analysis concluded that there was low public understanding of the meaning of the so-called consensus in Taiwan and that 'Taiwanese people might have supported the Consensus for content that it is not.'

== See also ==
- Act Governing Relations between the People of the Taiwan Area and the Mainland Area
- Cross-Strait relations
- Mutual non-recognition of sovereignty and mutual non-denial of authority to govern
- One Country on Each Side
- Taiwan consensus
