= Two Chinas =

Geopolitical concept

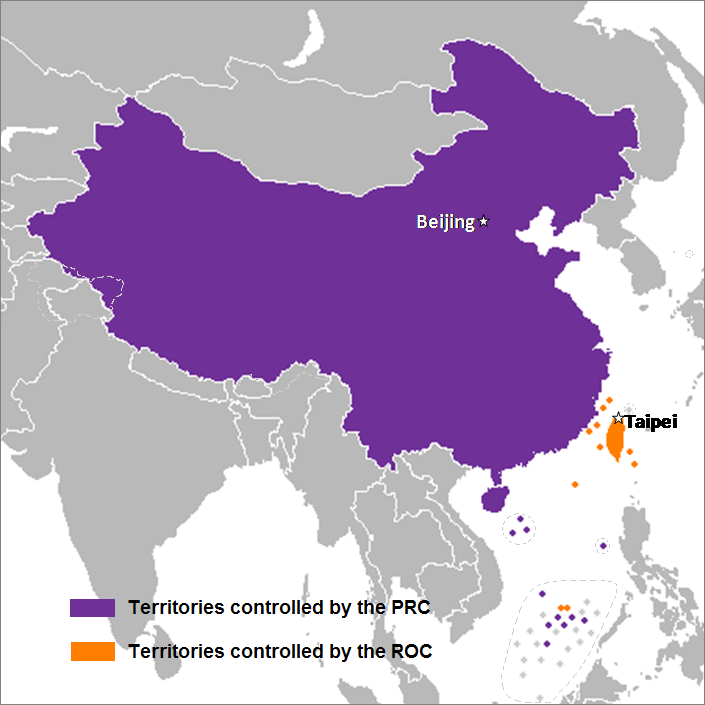
- Territories controlled by the People's Republic of China (PRC) (purple) and the Republic of China (ROC) (orange). The size of minor islands controlled by the PRC, the ROC, and other countries (gray) has been exaggerated in this map for ease of identification.
- Traditional Chinese: 兩個中國
- Simplified Chinese: 两个中国
Transcriptions
Standard Mandarin
- Hanyu Pinyin: liǎng gè Zhōngguó (in PRC) liǎng ge Zhōngguó (in ROC)
- Bopomofo: ㄌㄧㄤˇ ㄍㄜ` ㄓㄨㄥ ㄍㄨㄛ´ (in PRC) ㄌㄧㄤˇ ㄍㄜ˙ ㄓㄨㄥ ㄍㄨㄛ´ (in ROC)
- Wade–Giles: liang^{3} ko^{4} chung^{1}-kuo^{2} (in PRC) liang^{3} ko chung^{1}-kuo^{2} (in ROC)
- Yale Romanization: lyǎng gè Jūnggwó (in PRC) lyǎng ge Jūnggwó (in ROC)

The concept of Two Chinas refers to the political divide between the People's Republic of China (PRC) and the Republic of China (ROC). Founded in 1912, the ROC governed mainland China until the Chinese Communist Party established the PRC in 1949, forcing the ROC to retreat to Taiwan after losing the Chinese Civil War. Both are rival governments claiming to be the sole legitimate authority over all of China (One China), encompassing mainland China and Taiwan, and neither recognises the other’s legitimacy.

Today, they operate as separate entities with different political systems and ideologies. The differences between the two Chinas are stark, with the PRC being a one-party communist state and the ROC a multi-party democracy after transitioning from one-party military rule. Both regions maintain separate diplomatic relations.

== Background ==
In 1912, the Xuantong Emperor abdicated as a result of the Xinhai Revolution, and the Republic of China was established in Nanjing by revolutionaries under Sun Yat-sen. At the same time, the Beiyang government, led by Yuan Shikai, a former Qing dynasty general, existed in Beijing, whose legitimacy was challenged by the Nationalist government under the Kuomintang (KMT).

From 1912 to 1949, China was scarred by warlords, the Japanese invasion and the Chinese Civil War. Throughout this turbulent period, multiple governments existed in China. These include Yuan Shikai's Beiyang government (1912–1928), the Chinese Soviet Republic (1931–1937) established by the Chinese Communist Party (CCP), the puppet states of Manchukuo (1932–1945) and Mengjiang (1939–1945), the Fujian People's Government (1933–1934), Wang Jingwei's Japanese-sponsored puppet government (1940–1945), Ganden Phodrang's Tibet (1912–1951), Khoja Niyaz's Turkic Islamic Republic of East Turkestan (1933–1934), the Soviet-backed East Turkestan Republic (1944–1949), the Tuvan People's Republic (1921–1944), Bogd Khan's Mongolian State in Outer Mongolia (1911–1924) and the Mongolian People's Republic (1924–1992), with the latter recognised by China in 1946.

As the Chinese Civil War ended in 1949, the Chinese communist People's Republic of China (PRC), led by CCP Chairman Mao Zedong, took control of Mainland China. The Republic of China, led by President Chiang Kai-shek, retreated the government of the Republic of China to the island of Taiwan, which was a former Qing prefecture that was ceded to Japan, after the ROC assumed administrative control in 1945 after World War II, hence effectively dividing China into two political states, (Note: The southeastern province of Fujian was split, resulting in the PRC controlling most of the province including the islands of Haitan, Nanri and Meizhou with the ROC retaining control of Kinmen, Matsu and Wuqiu islands.) similar to North and South Korea, West and East Germany and North and South Vietnam.

Though fighting continued for the next several years, by the time of the Korean War the lines of control were sharply drawn: the Communist-led People's Republic of China government in Beijing controlled most of mainland China, while the Kuomintang-led Republic of China government, now in Taipei, controlled the island of Taiwan and Penghu, some surrounding islands, and a number of islands off the coast of Fujian. This stalemate was enforced with the assistance of the United States government that began deterring an invasion of Taiwan after the start of the Korean War. Japan would sever claims to Taiwan and Penghu upon the signing of Treaty of San Francisco that took effect in 1952 leaving the legal status of Taiwan in limbo.

For many years, both governments contended to be the sole legitimate government of China. With the fighting largely over, the major battleground became diplomatic. Before the 1970s, the Republic of China was still recognised by many countries and the United Nations as the sole legitimate government of "China", which claimed sovereignty over both mainland China and Taiwan. The Republic of China had been a founding member of the United Nations and was one of the five permanent members of the Security Council until 1971, when they were expelled from the UN and China's representation was replaced by the People's Republic of China (PRC) via UN General Assembly Resolution 2758. Before the 1970s, few foreign governments recognised the People's Republic of China. The first governments to recognise it as the government of "China" were Soviet bloc countries, members of the non-aligned movement, and the United Kingdom (1950). The catalyst to change came in 1971, when the United Nations General Assembly expelled representatives of Chiang Kai-shek by refusing to recognise their accreditations as representatives of China. Recognition for the People's Republic of China soon followed from most other governments, including the United States. The Republic of China continued to compete with the People's Republic of China (PRC) to be recognised as the legitimate government of China.

Since the 1990s, however, a rising movement for formal recognition of Taiwanese independence has made the political status of Taiwan the dominant issue, replacing the debate about the legitimate government of China. A view in Taiwan is that the Republic of China and the People's Republic of China are both sovereign, thus forming "two Chinas", or "one China, one Taiwan". Former Republic of China President Chen Shui-bian adamantly supported this status quo, and accordingly largely abandoned the campaign for the Republic of China to be recognised as the sole legitimate government of China. Under President Chen, the ROC government was campaigning for the Republic of China to join the United Nations as representative of its effective territory—Taiwan and nearby islands—only. Chen's successor, President Ma Ying-jeou, ceased that push.

== Current situation ==
The map shows the One-China policy in practice. People's Republic of China (PRC) States recognising PRC only States recognising PRC with informal ROC relations Republic of China (ROC) States recognising ROC only

In the past, both the People's Republic of China (PRC) and the Republic of China (ROC) have claimed de jure sovereignty over mainland China whilst denying the legitimacy of the other. The position of the PRC and the KMT in Taiwan remains that there is only one sovereign entity of China, united and indivisible. The liberal Pan-Green Coalition in Taiwan prefers the status quo and is dedicated to maintaining the sovereignty over the territory under effective control.

The official diplomacy of the two governments remains exclusive to each other. As of 2026, 178 UN member states and the State of Palestine have a formal diplomatic relation with the PRC, while 11 UN member states and the Holy See have a formal diplomatic relation with the ROC.

=== People's Republic of China ===
The government of the People's Republic of China (PRC) opposes treating the Republic of China (ROC) as a legitimate state and portrays Taiwan as a rogue province of the PRC. The CCP-led Chinese government has consistently opposed two parallel Chinese sovereign states, instead espousing that all of "China" is under one single, indivisible sovereignty under its "One China Principle", explicitly including Taiwan. Under this principle, while the PRC has no de facto control over territory administered by the ROC, the PRC nevertheless claims that the territories controlled by both the PRC and ROC are part of the same, indivisible sovereign entity "China".

PRC government policy mandates that any country that wishes to establish a diplomatic relationship with the PRC must first discontinue any formal relationship with the ROC. According to The Fletcher Forum of World Affairs, "non-recognition of the Taiwanese government is a prerequisite for conducting formal diplomatic relations with the PRC—in effect forcing other governments to choose between Beijing and Taipei." In order to compete for other countries' recognition, each government has given money to certain small countries. Several small African and Caribbean countries have established and discontinued diplomatic relationships with both sides several times in exchange for huge financial support from each side. The PRC also uses its international influence to prohibit the ROC from entering international events such as the Olympic Games under its official name. Instead, the ROC was forced to adopt the name Chinese Taipei to enter such events since the 1980s. Furthermore, on press releases and other media, CCP and the officials of PRC never refer to the ROC as such, instead referring to the territory of Taiwan as "China's Taiwan Province", and to the ROC government as "the Taiwan authority".

=== Republic of China ===
Until the constitutional reforms of 1991, the Republic of China (ROC) actively asserted its claim of sovereignty over all of China and still opposes treating the People's Republic of China (PRC) as a legitimate state. ROC authorities clarified the constitutional reforms by stating they do not "dispute the fact that the PRC controls mainland China." Since then, the ROC has neither actively asserted these claims nor denied them. Democratisation and liberalisation of free speech has led to the emergence of the Taiwan independence movement, which supports the idea of "Two Chinas". The ROC's position with respect to "Two Chinas" has varied by administration, with Pan-Green administrations favouring it and Pan-Blue administrations preferring the position of One China with respective interpretations.

In 1999, then President Lee Teng-hui defined the relationship as "special state-to-state relations".

President Chen Shui-bian proposed in 2002 that "with Taiwan and China on each side of the Taiwan Strait, each side is a country". In 2003 he further said that "Taiwan is not a province of one country nor is it a state of another". Chen administration took steps to use the name "Taiwan" internationally to boost the international business activities with Taiwan by preventing confusion between the "two Chinas". For example, the word "Taiwan" appears underneath "Republic of China" on Republic of China passports such that the visa policy towards citizens of ROC can be separated from the policy towards people from PRC.

In September 2008 President Ma Ying-jeou from the Kuomintang stated that the sovereignty issues between the two sovereigns cannot be resolved at present, and brought up the 1992 Consensus as a temporary measure until a solution becomes available. The spokesman for the ROC Presidential Office Wang Yu-chi (Chinese: 王郁琦) later clarified the President's statement and said that the relations are between two regions of one country, based on the context of the ROC Constitution, and the Statute Governing the Relations Between the Peoples of the Taiwan Area and Mainland Area and the 1992 Consensus.

President Tsai Ing-wen of the Democratic Progressive Party was elected in 2016. Her administration adopted a different policy in this issue. Under the Tsai administration, the claim over the Chinese territory on the Eurasian continent was again weakened.

== Historical precedents ==
Official name(s)	Soviet Zone (1927–1931) Chinese Soviet Republic (1931–1937) Anti-Japanese Base Areas (1937–1946) Liberated Zone (1946–1949) People's Republic of China (1949–present)	(Taiwan) Republic of China (1912–present)
Common name	China	Taiwan (present) China
Date of establishment	1 August 1927 7 November 1931 1 October 1949	1 January 1912
Effective jurisdiction	Fujian, Jiangxi, Hunan and Jiangsu Soviet Zones (1927–1934) Northern Shaanxi and Manchuria (1935–present) Mainland China (1949–present) Tibet (includes Xizang and Chamdo) (1951–present) Hong Kong (1997–present) Macau (1999–present)	Mainland China (1912–1949) Outer Mongolia (1919–1921) Taiwan and Pescadores (1945–present); Kinmen and Matsu Islands (1912–present)
Representation of "China" in the United Nations	1971–present	1945–1971 (original)
Capital	Jinggangshan (1927–1930); Ruijin (1931–1934); Zhidan (1935); Yan'an (1936–1947); Xibaipo (1947–1949); Beijing (1949–present)	Nanjing (1912, 1927–1937, 1946–1949); Beijing (1912–1928); Chongqing (1937–1946, 1949); Guangzhou (1949) Chengdu (1949); Taipei (1949–present)
Founder	Mao Zedong	Sun Yat-sen
Incumbent head of state	Xi Jinping	Lai Ching-te
Incumbent head of government	Li Qiang	Cho Jung-tai

== See also ==
- Greater China
- Cross-strait relations
- Chinese unification
- Chinese legitimacy question
- Huadu (Taiwan)
- Exclusive mandate
