= One Country on Each Side =

Concept on the political status of Taiwan

- Traditional Chinese: 一邊一國
- Simplified Chinese: 一边一国
Transcriptions
Standard Mandarin
- Hanyu Pinyin: Yī biān yī guó
Southern Min
- Hokkien POJ: Chi̍t Pêng Chi̍t Kok

The One China policy in practice.; People's Republic of China (PRC).; Republic of China (ROC).; Countries recognizing the PRC only.; Countries recognizing the ROC only.; Countries recognizing the PRC, but have semi-formal relations with the ROC.

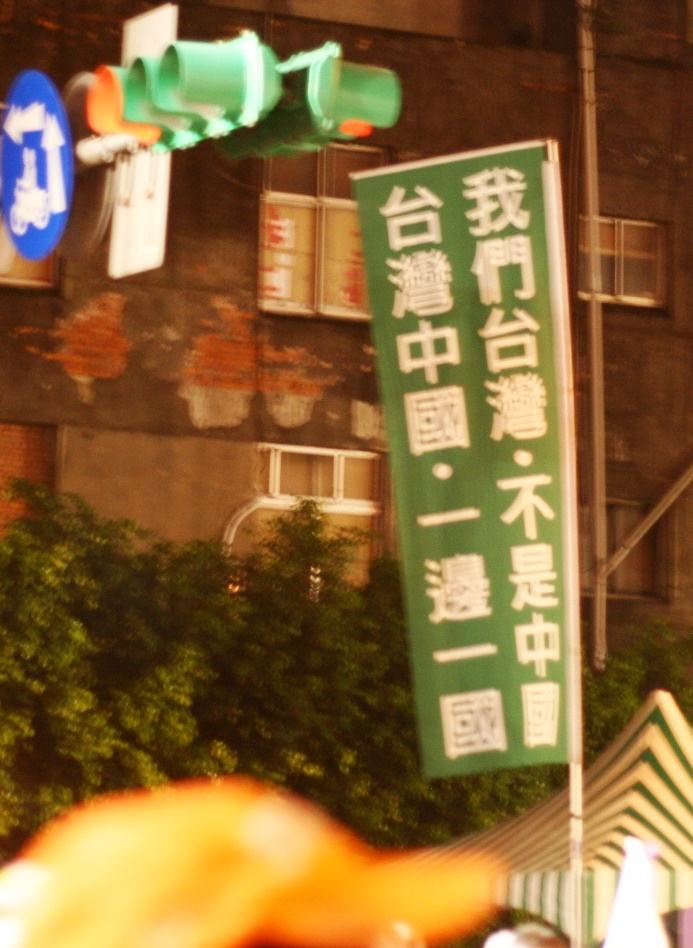
Banner during a 2012 rally in Taipei. Translation: "Our Taiwan is not China. Taiwan and China, one country on each side."

One Country on Each Side is a concept articulated in the Democratic Progressive Party government led by Chen Shui-bian, the former president of the Republic of China (2000–2008), regarding the political status of Taiwan. It emphasizes that the People's Republic of China and the Republic of China (or alternatively, Taiwan itself) are two different countries, (namely "One China, one Taiwan"), as opposed to two separate political entities within the same country of "China". One Country on Each Side is the position of the supporters of the Pan-Green coalition.

== History ==
Peng Ming-min, a Taiwanese democracy and independence activist, stated in his 1964 Declaration of Formosan Self-Salvation that "'One China, one Taiwan' had been an ironclad fact" (「一個中國，一個台灣」早已是鐵一般的事實). The same concept "One China, One Formosa" was presented in Chen Lung-chu and Harold Lasswell's book-length proposal in 1967 entitled Formosa, China and the United Nations: Formosa in the World Community.

Chen used this phrase in an August 3, 2002, telecast to the annual conference of the World Federation of Taiwanese Associations meeting in Tokyo when he stated that it needs to be clear that "with Taiwan and China on each side of the Taiwan Strait, each side is a country." His statements were made in Taiwanese Minnan as opposed to Mandarin and drew a barrage of criticism from the mainland Chinese press, which had previously shied away from the types of attacks it gave to Lee Teng-hui, who promoted a similar "special state-to-state relations". The United States also expressed serious concerns over this concept, as the U.S. felt that this concept appeared to have departed from Chen's earlier pledge of "Four Noes and One Without". "State-to-state relations" had originally been translated in English as "country-to-country relations" but the Mainland Affairs Council got the translation changed to the less provocative option.

Special state-to-state relations is also known as "two-states theory".

The Taiwan Action Party Alliance, founded on 18 August 2019, incorporated One Country on Each Side into its Chinese-language name.

== See also ==
- Four Wants and One Without
- Mutual non-recognition of sovereignty and mutual non-denial of authority to govern
- Two Chinas
