= Dutai (Taiwan) =

Independent Taiwan
- Traditional Chinese: 獨立台灣
- Simplified Chinese: 独立台湾
Transcriptions
Standard Mandarin
- Hanyu Pinyin: Dúlì táiwān

Abbreviation
- Traditional Chinese: 獨台
- Simplified Chinese: 独台
Transcriptions
Standard Mandarin
- Hanyu Pinyin: Dútái

Independent Taiwan, abbreviated in Chinese as Dutai (Chinese: 獨台; pinyin: Dú tái) is a political proposition and ideology which posits that after 1949, the People's Republic of China (PRC) separated from the Republic of China (ROC) and became an independent sovereign state (i.e., mainland independence). The ROC no longer controls mainland China and only possesses Taiwan. This faction advocates that the ROC should acknowledge that its actual territory extends only to Taiwan, abandon the mindset of the Chinese Civil War, cease pursuing a counterattack the mainland, and neither seek unification with the PRC nor unification under the ROC. They agree that by promoting democracy in Taiwan and actively gaining the recognition of the Taiwanese people, the independent political status quo can be maintained, free from the rule of the PRC. Internationally, they advocate sharing Chinese representation with the PRC, establishing equal diplomatic relations, and simultaneously joining or sharing a seat in the United Nations, coexisting internationally.

Although it overlaps with the Taiwan independence movement, the difference is that the supporters of this idea do not insist on using names such as "Taiwan State" or "Republic of Taiwan" as the national name, do not insist on completely severing ties with the Republic of China system, and agree that the Republic of China should be Taiwanized and the national name can be decided through democratic procedures. Because the main promoters and supporters are mainly from the mainland ethnic group in Taiwan, the scholar Chen Yishen once called it "the Taiwan independence movement of mainland elites". In this line, the faction in Taiwan that agrees that Taiwan should continue to use "Republic of China" as the national name is sometimes called "Republic of China independence" (Huadu) by the traditional independence faction.

This ideology is regarded by the People's Republic of China and some radical pro-unification factions as one of the factions of the Taiwan independence movement. It is a kind of Taiwan independence and separatism, described as "soft Taiwan independence".

== Overview ==
The term "Independent Taiwan" literally means that Taiwan is a sovereign and independent country, and this sovereignty does not extend to mainland China. Those who subscribe to this ideology believe that after the founding of the People's Republic of China in 1949, mainland China separated from the Republic of China and became an independent sovereign state.

This argument holds that after 1955, the territory of the Republic of China consisted only of Taiwan, Penghu, Kinmen, Matsu, and some islands in the South China Sea. It believes that after the People's Republic of China obtained the Republic of China's "China" seat in the United Nations in 1971, the Republic of China could no longer represent China as a whole. It believes the people of Taiwan should reach a consensus that Taiwan is equivalent to the Republic of China and establish a Second Republic of China in Taiwan.

Wang Yingjin, an author from the People's Republic of China, pointed out that this concept was created by Taiwanese society and introduced and used by mainland China. It is "a product of specific historical conditions" and in the 1990s "reflected the views and attitudes of different political forces in Taiwan at that time on cross-strait relations."

== History ==
The idea of Dutai originated in the 1950s. The United States promoted the "two Chinas" and "dual representation" proposals, hoping that the Republic of China and the People's Republic of China could coexist in the international community. However, it was difficult to promote due to the opposition from both the Republic of China and the People's Republic of China. This proposal was supported by some diplomatic bureaucrats in the Republic of China, such as Chiang Ting-fu, Yeh Kung-chao, and Yang Hsi- kun. They hoped that Chiang Kai-shek, the president of the Republic of China, would respect the independence of the People's Republic of China and abandon the "one China" policy and counterattack the mainland. In addition, Kuomintang members such as Lei Chen and Yin Hai-guang promoted the democratic movement in Taiwan, hoping to win the recognition of the Taiwanese people and jointly establish a democratic country in Taiwan. These ideas were a minority among the Kuomintang and the Mainlanders at that time and were suppressed by the central authorities.

During President Chiang Ching-kuo's term, the Three Principles of the People were adopted as the policy for unifying China. The emphasis was no longer on counterattacking the mainland, but on building up Taiwan and achieving peaceful reunification in the future.

During President Lee Teng-hui's term, in 1991, the Additional Articles to the Constitution of the Republic of China and the Guidelines for National Unification were adopted, proposing the concept of "one China, two political entities". Politically, the Republic of China and the People's Republic of China were recognized as two separate but equal political entities.

== The views of the pro-unification faction and mainland China ==
Scholars from the pro-unification faction, such as Zhang Yazhong, believe that after 2012, independence has gradually become a consensus within Taiwan. They believe that Ma Ying-jeou's adoption of the " no unification, no independence, no use of force" policy and his refusal to promote China's unification is a form of pro-independence advocacy. China believes that this includes advocating "one China, two equal political entities" or "two Chinas in stages," adhering to the legal system of the Republic of China, and claiming that "the Republic of China is a sovereign and independent country in Taiwan." Domestically, through constitutional amendments, direct election of the president, abolition of the Taiwan Province system, and implementation of a single parliament, Taiwan's sovereignty and national form are highlighted. Internationally, Taiwan conducts "pragmatic diplomacy" activities, seeking "dual recognition" and "returning to the United Nations," attempting to make Taiwan obtain an independent and complete international personality, become an equal political entity on par with China and recognized internationally, thereby fixing, "legalizing," and perpetuating the temporary separation between the two sides.
