= Soft Taiwan independence =

- Traditional Chinese: 柔性台獨
- Simplified Chinese: 柔性台独
Transcriptions
Standard Mandarin
- Hanyu Pinyin: Róuxìng táidú

Alternative name
- Traditional Chinese: 軟性台獨
- Simplified Chinese: 软性台独
Transcriptions
Standard Mandarin
- Hanyu Pinyin: Ruǎnxìng táidú

Second alternative Chinese name
- Traditional Chinese: 韌性台獨
- Simplified Chinese: 韧性台独
Transcriptions
Standard Mandarin
- Hanyu Pinyin: Rènxìng táidú

Third alternative Chinese name
- Traditional Chinese: 隱性台獨
- Simplified Chinese: 隐性台独
Transcriptions
Standard Mandarin
- Hanyu Pinyin: Yǐnxìng táidú

Fourth alternative Chinese name
- Traditional Chinese: 務實台獨
- Simplified Chinese: 务实台独
Transcriptions
Standard Mandarin
- Hanyu Pinyin: Wùshí táidú

Fifth alternative Chinese name
- Traditional Chinese: 漸進式台獨
- Simplified Chinese: 渐进式台独
Transcriptions
Standard Mandarin
- Hanyu Pinyin: Jiànjìn shì táidú

"Soft Taiwan independence" is a political term used in the People's Republic of China (PRC) to refer to a type of Taiwan independence movement. It refers to a situation where Taiwan does not pursue de jure independence, does not publicly declare its intention to implement independence, and minimizes direct confrontation with the PRC, but refuses to accept the PRC's one China principle; the PRC views these actions are aimed at promoting Taiwan independence. Since Tsai Ing-wen took office as President of the Republic of China (ROC), the Chinese Communist Party (CCP) and the PRC government have increasingly used this term. They believe that Tsai Ing-wen's perceived promotion of de-Sinicization, cultural Taiwan independence, and enhanced Taiwan diplomacy are, in effect, promoting Taiwan independence. There is some overlap between the definitions of soft Taiwan independence and de facto Taiwan independence.

== History ==
After President Tsai Ing-wen took office in 2016, the Taiwan Affairs Office of the People's Republic of China further subdivided the Taiwan independence movement into several different terms such as soft, cultural, and strategic Taiwan independence, and began to position the Tsai Ing-wen government as soft Taiwan independence. At a seminar held in mainland China in 2017, Zhang Zhijun, director of the Taiwan Affairs Office, Dai Bingguo, president of the National Taiwan Research Association, and others identified the Democratic Progressive Party government as a Taiwan independence regime, but because President Tsai Ing-wen did not declare that she wanted to carry out Taiwan independence, she was defined as soft Taiwan independence. Wang Zaixi, former deputy director of the Taiwan Affairs Office, believed that President Tsai Ing-wen's promotion of de-Sinicization and DPP Tainan Mayor Lai Ching-te's promotion of Taiwan independence were more dangerous than President Chen Shui-bian. On the other hand, the Tsai Ing-wen government stated that it did not pursue soft Taiwan independence, but rather respected the choice of the Taiwanese people.

== See also ==
- Huadu (Taiwan)
- Two sides of the Taiwan Strait are not subordinate to each other
