= Ludu (Taiwan) =

Mainland independence
- Traditional Chinese: 中國大陸獨立
- Simplified Chinese: 中国大陆独立
Transcriptions
Standard Mandarin
- Hanyu Pinyin: Zhōngguó dàlù dúlì

Abbreviation
- Traditional Chinese: 陸獨
- Simplified Chinese: 陆独
Transcriptions
Standard Mandarin
- Hanyu Pinyin: Dútái

People's Republic of China independence
- Traditional Chinese: 中華人民共和國獨立
- Simplified Chinese: 中华人民共和国独立
Transcriptions
Standard Mandarin
- Hanyu Pinyin: Zhōnghuá Rénmín Gònghéguó dúlì

Chinese Communist Party independence
- Traditional Chinese: 中國共產黨獨立
- Simplified Chinese: 中国共产党独立
Transcriptions
Standard Mandarin
- Hanyu Pinyin: Zhōngguó Gòngchǎndǎng dúlì

Abbreviation
- Traditional Chinese: 共獨
- Simplified Chinese: 共独
Transcriptions
Standard Mandarin
- Hanyu Pinyin: Gòngdú

Mainland independence, abbreviated in Chinese as Ludu (Chinese: 陸獨; pinyin: Lùdú) and also known as Gongdu (Chinese: 共獨; pinyin: Gòngdú; i.e., the independence of the Chinese Communist Party) is a political view on cross-strait relations. It holds that the People's Republic of China (PRC), established by the Chinese Communist Party in mainland China in 1949, broke away from the rule of the Republic of China (ROC) and became an independent and autonomous sovereign state, thus establishing the status quo in the Taiwan Strait. This view was first proposed in Taiwan by a group of people known as Dutai and Huadu, as well as supporters of the Taiwan independence movement.

The PRC believes that it has completely replaced the ROC and opposes the concept of mainland independence under the one China principle, listing this view as an idea of Taiwan independence, which is based on the principle of "two Chinas, one China, one Taiwan". In the ROC, the concept of mainland independence was opposed because of the one China ideology. After the democratic reform, the public opinion supporting the mainland independence gradually increased. Today, political parties such as the Kuomintang still oppose the concept of mainland independence.

== Overview6 ==
After the establishment of the Chinese Communist Party (CCP), it carried out activities to establish an independent country in China. In 1931, the CCP established the Chinese Soviet Republic in Jiangxi and other places, advocating that the Chinese Soviet Republic was an independent country different from the Republic of China. At the same time, it believed that each province of China had the right to establish an independent country. After the Chinese Civil War, the CCP established the People's Republic of China (PRC) in mainland China in 1949, and the Republic of China government retreated to Taiwan.

After the founding of the PRC, the ROC government continued to claim that the mainland authorities were preparing to launch an aggressive war to eliminate the Republic of China and annex Taiwan. President Chiang Kai-shek promoted the principle of "Han and traitors cannot coexist" and counterattacking the mainland, and opposed the independence of the People’s Republic of China. In the 1950s, the United States promoted the dual representation plan, hoping to allow the ROC and the PRC to coexist in the United Nations. This plan was opposed by the ROC government, but a few diplomatic bureaucrats, such as Tsiang Tingfu, George Yeh, and H. K. Yang, hoped that Taiwan could respect the international reality that the People’s Republic of China had become independent and abandon the policy of "one China" and counterattack against the mainland. In the public, there were people such as Lei Chen, who also advocated abandoning the counterattack against the mainland, recognizing the reality that the People’s Republic of China had become independent, and committed to establishing Taiwan as a democratic country. These propositions were all classified as pro-independence Taiwan.

Having withdrawn from the United Nations and severed diplomatic ties with the United States, and with most countries recognizing the People's Republic of China as the sole legitimate representative of China, the international community began to gradually relax its stance during the presidency of Chiang Ching-kuo. In diplomacy, the PRC's status as a state was tacitly acknowledged to a limited extent, and a flexible diplomacy was adopted. Under President Lee Teng-hui, policies such as pragmatic diplomacy, "one China, two political entities", "separate governance across the Taiwan Strait," "two Chinas in stages," "one divided China", and "special state-to-state relations" were proposed, further expanding the tacit acceptance of the PRC's existence.

During the Ma Ying-jeou administration, he opposed the two-states theory, promoted the policy of "one country, two areas" and " one China under the Constitution", and advocated that the Republic of China represents China and opposed the independence of the People's Republic of China. However, he also advocated the 1992 Consensus, the policy of "one China with respective interpretations", and tacitly accepted the rule of the People's Republic of China in mainland China. In a 2011 election forum in Kaohsiung, Taiwan, Ma Ying-jeou believed that China could not criticize Taiwan independence because the Constitution of the Republic of China existed first, and it was the People's Republic of China that was pursuing mainland independence. He advocated setting aside the sovereignty dispute and adopting the status quo of no unification, no independence, no use of force.
