= Second Republic of China =

The Second Republic of China may refer to:

- Nationalist government (1925–1948), as opposed to the Beiyang government (1912–1928) before the Northern Expedition (the "first" Republic of China).
- Republic of China (Taiwan) since 1991
