= 2008 Taiwanese presidential election =

- 22 March 2008
- Registered: 17,321,622
- Turnout: 76.33% (▼3.95pp)
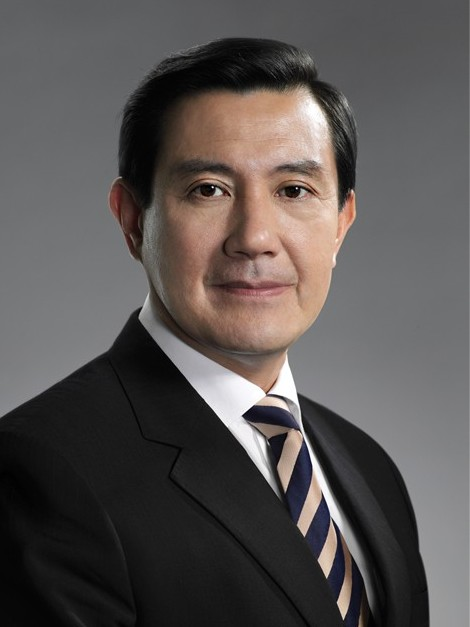

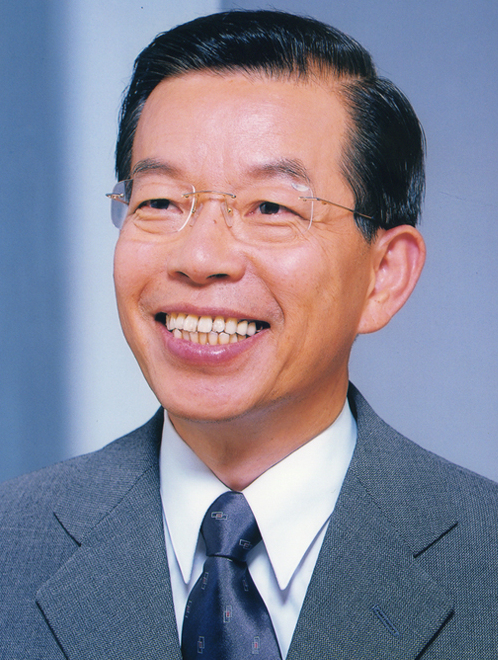
Nominee	Ma Ying-jeou	Frank Hsieh
Party	KMT	DPP
Running mate	Vincent Siew	Su Tseng-chang
Popular vote	7,659,014	5,444,949
Percentage	58.45%	41.55%
President before election
Chen Shui-bian
DPP
Elected President
Ma Ying-jeou
KMT

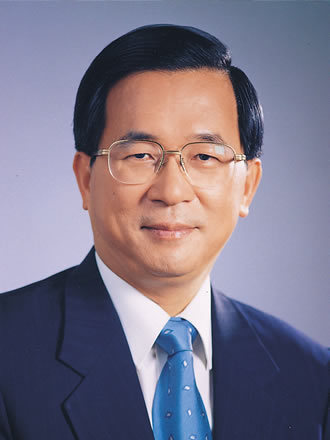
Chen Shui-bian, the incumbent President of the Republic of China was ineligible to seek re-election after serving two consecutive terms.

Presidential elections were held in Taiwan on 22 March 2008. Kuomintang (KMT) nominee Ma Ying-jeou won with 58% of the vote, ending eight years of Democratic Progressive Party (DPP) rule. Along with the 2008 legislative election, Ma's landslide victory brought the Kuomintang back to power in the Republic of China.

This was the fourth direct election for the President of the Republic of China. The two candidates were Democratic Progressive Party candidate Frank Hsieh and Kuomintang (KMT) nominee Ma Ying-jeou. The KMT ticket was officially formed as of June 23, 2007, with Ma announcing his choice for running mate to be former premier Vincent Siew. The DPP ticket was announced in August, 2007, with Frank Hsieh selecting former Premier Su Tseng-chang. Unlike the 2004 presidential election, the political rhetoric of the campaigns tended to focus on economic issues and government corruption rather than national identity and the political status of Taiwan, with both candidates endorsing the status quo in the short term. But much like previous elections, this election was also marked with island-wide mass rallies and much political mudslinging.

The KMT ticket received a larger percentage and more votes than any other candidate in the previous three direct presidential elections. The election occurred as incumbent President Chen Shui-bian's popularity remained at record lows following mass rallies in September 2006 urging him to resign amid implications of corruption. Amid general economic malaise, as unemployment had risen under Chen's presidency and Taiwan's per capita GDP was surpassed by that of South Korea, Ma won on a platform of economic revitalization and a promise to improve cross-straits relations as "a peacemaker not a troublemaker". The election occurred in the wake of the KMT's landslide victory in the 2008 legislative elections in which the Pan-Blue Coalition won a three-quarters majority in the Legislative Yuan. On the same day two referendums on joining the United Nations, the first supported by the DPP of President Chen and the second supported by the KMT, failed due to low turnout. Prior to the vote, the KMT had encouraged its supporters to boycott the DPP referendum, and expressed its "understanding" if supporters boycotted both.

== Presidential nominees ==
Candidates were to register with their respective parties March 5–9, 2007, for a primary election. Selection of candidates for President in Taiwan, unlike most other nations, were weighed; the actual primary election results accounted for 30% of the final outcome while public opinion polls accounted for the other 70%. Final tallies were announced May 30, 2007.

=== Democratic Progressive Party ===
Leading candidates for the Democratic Progressive Party "Four Heavenly Kings" (a less literal translation in English that perhaps gives the meaning more clearly is the "Four Heavyweights") sans incumbent President Chen Shui-bian (who was barred from running due to term limits)—Frank Hsieh, Su Tseng-chang, and Yu Shyi-kun—and incumbent vice president Annette Lu. All three of the men had served as premier under Chen Shui-bian and as DPP chairman during part of the Chen presidency. In addition, Hsieh has been a popular mayor of Kaohsiung, Su has been county magistrate of Taipei County and Pingtung County, and Yu served as Secretary-General in the Office of the President.

On May 6, 2007, the DPP primaries took place in all 24 cities and counties in Taiwan. There were 254,963 eligible voters, with voter turnout at 56.06%. Former premier Frank Hsieh emerged as the winner of the DPP primaries, winning 17 of 24 cities and counties with 62,849 votes, about 44% of the votes cast. Despite the fact that the primary results only account for 30% of the final outcome in determining the nominee, fellow DPP candidates Su, who got 46,994 votes; Yu, with 22,211 votes; and Lu with 8,666 votes, endorsed Hsieh before the second stage primary, based on opinion polls, was held, causing the DPP to cancel the second stage primary.

The junior partner in the pan-green coalition, the Taiwan Solidarity Union, neither fielded nor endorsed a candidate. TSU Chairman Shu Chin-chiang seemingly endorsed Ma on September 19, 2007 when he referred to Ma as "our President-to-be." At the same time, several TSU legislators stated that they would support DPP candidate Frank Hsieh. In December, Lee Teng-hui, considered the "spiritual leader" of the TSU, rescinded his support of Chen in 2004, and urged citizens against voting for the DPP in upcoming legislative elections. While Lee openly denounced supporting the ruling DPP party, he stopped short of endorsing any party or candidate and waited until March 20, 2008 (two days before the election) to endorse Hsieh.

==== Democratic Progressive nominees ====
2008 Democratic Progressive ticket
Frank Hsieh	Su Tseng-chang
for President	for Vice President
President of the Executive Yuan (2005–2006)	President of the Executive Yuan (2006–2007)

=== Kuomintang ===
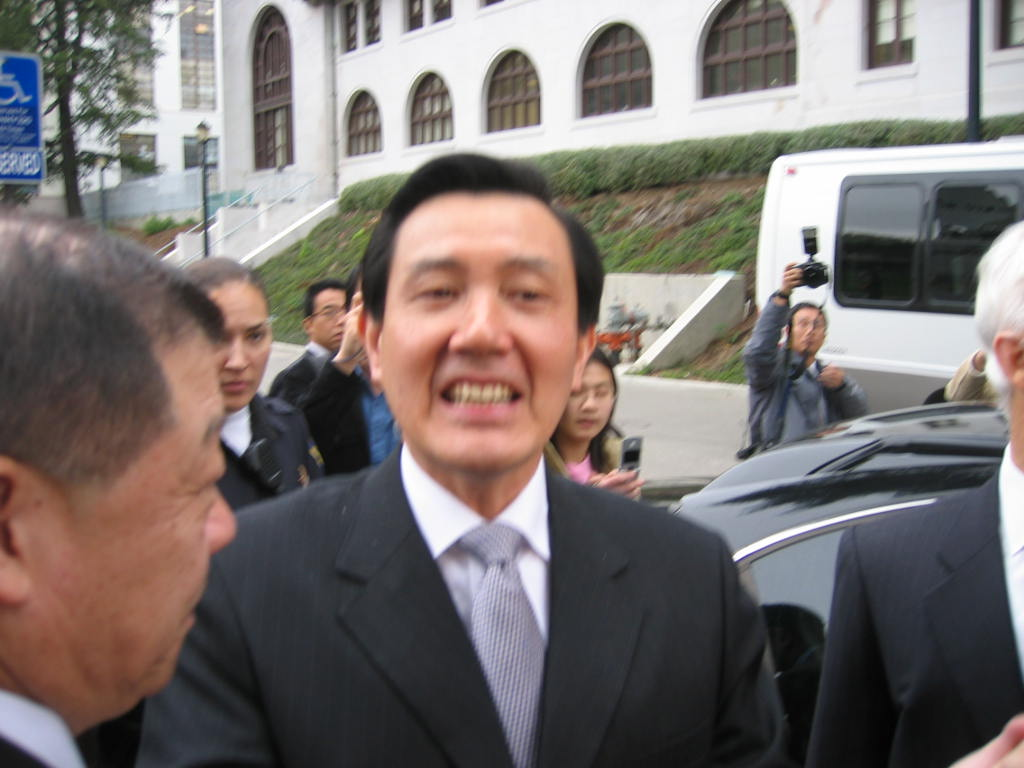
Ma Ying-jeou, seen here greeting supporters during a visit to UC Berkeley, outlined his cross-strait policy during his March 2006 visit to the United States.

Following the KMT's defeat in 2004 and before the 2005 KMT chairman election, Taipei Mayor Ma Ying-jeou and Legislative Yuan President Wang Jin-pyng were both considered leading candidates for the nomination. Ma's landslide victory over Wang in the 2005 KMT chairman election immediately made him the frontrunner. His position was furthered bolstered by the KMT's victories in the 2005 3-in-1 local elections. Ma Ying-jeou began his campaign before his announcement for candidacy, taking trips Europe and Japan in 2006, nominally to obtain business deals for Taipei, but covered widely by the media for his foreign policy remarks. He met with numerous politicians in Washington, DC, including U.S. Deputy Secretary of State Robert Zoellick. Significantly, Ma Ying-jeou became the first head of a pan-Blue coalition party to state that declaring de jure Taiwan independence was a legitimate choice of the Taiwanese people, though he qualified it saying that this was not a position of the KMT, after receiving much criticism from pan-Blue politicians. He also stated that Taiwan should form a common market with mainland China and establish direct transportation links.

On February 13, 2007 Ma was indicted for misuse of official funds as Taipei Mayor and announced his candidacy as he resigned the KMT chairmanship. He was formally nominated as the KMT candidate on May 2, 2007. Wang did not run against Ma, who was virtually unopposed. Final approval of the nomination was passed by the KMT congress in June. Wang was an early frontrunner to be Ma's running-mate but declined the position absent of assurances from Ma of what responsibilities he would hold as vice president. Other leading candidates were Wu Den-yih, incumbent KMT general secretary; Jason Lin, CEO of Uni-President Group; and Tsai Ing-wen, a DPP member and former vice-premier. On June 23, 2007, Ma officially announced former premier and former vice-presidential candidate (in 2000) Vincent Siew as his running mate, praising Siew's economic experience and declaring the economy to be the central focus of his campaign.

Neither the New Party nor the People First Party, junior partners of the KMT in the "Pan-Blue Coalition," fielded a candidate and endorsed the KMT ticket. PFP Chairman James Soong appeared at KMT headquarters once Ma's victory became apparent and pledged to dissolve the PFP to join the KMT.

==== Kuomintang nominees ====
2008 Kuomintang ticket
Ma Ying-jeou	Vincent Siew
for President	for Vice President
Mayor of Taipei (1998–2006)	President of the Executive Yuan (1997–2000)

== Issues ==
Tens of thousands of Taiwanese waved banners and shouted political slogans March 16, 2008, as the island's rival parties rallied support ahead of the March 22, 2008 presidential elections, with the March 2008 violence in Tibet in the background and Taiwan's own relations with the China on the front burner. The Taiwan-wide events were meant to energize supporters in the home stretch of a race that has so far lacked the passion and commitment of presidential elections in 2000 and 2004.

=== Economy ===
Since selecting Vincent Siew as his running mate, Ma announced that the focus of his election campaign was the recovery of the Taiwanese economy. He said that the independence—unification debate is a "fake issue" with no bearing on the general welfare of the Taiwanese people. He also labeled Siew as the would-be "chief architect" to revive the economy, because of Siew's solid economic background.

Ma proposed a common market with China; Hsieh said this would lead to job losses and importation of dangerous Chinese products, referring to lead-contaminated toys from Mattel and an excess of highly qualified workers from China.

=== Corruption ===
The investigations into alleged misuse of funds by members of both the KMT and DPP were another hot topic.

President Chen Shui-Bian suffered a large loss in popularity due to corruption allegations concerning his family. The KMT attempted to capitalize on Ma's public image as a man of integrity, which stemmed from his investigations into vote-buying within his own party while he served as Justice Minister in the early 1990s. Ma resigned as Justice Minister in the mid-1990s and his political career was considered to be over due to what some thought was his zealous investigation of corruption. However, Ma Ying-Jeou was indicted on charges of misusing his mayoral discretionary funds, which was intended for funding personal expenses related to official duties. Ma moved half of the funds into his personal accounts, and his defense was that this practice was standard among government officials. Ma maintained his innocence and stated that the indictment amounted to political prosecution and he would not give up his run for presidency even if found guilty.

DPP candidate Frank Hsieh came under investigation for similar charges in irregularity and misuse of funds while he served as mayor of Kaohsiung. However, different from Ma, Hsieh stated that if he was found guilty in his mayoral funds case, he would not continue running for president.

On August 12, 2007, Ma was acquitted of misusing the funds, but one of his office clerks was found guilty and faced a year in prison for his own failures in administrative duties.

=== Status of Taiwan ===
As is common with Taiwanese elections, an important issue in the election is the future political status of Taiwan and maintenance of good cross-straits relations and avoidance of war with China (PRC). In general, the DPP favors Taiwan independence; the KMT, on the other hand, promotes the one-China principle and desires eventual unification of Taiwan with mainland China, as the KMT still regards the ROC as the sole legitimate government of China. The KMT's main objective is to establish a closer economic relationship with mainland China. It was widely recognized that no candidate could win without supporting the status quo of de facto autonomy and ambiguous legal status (as they did in 2004) in order to attract centrist voters. Also, in 2004, both mainstream candidates recognized eventual unification and independence as a possible option as a means to attract the center. The strategy of both sides, as was the case in 2004, was to persuade voters that it can best maintain the status quo and protect Taiwan from coerced unification by China.

While the smaller, more radical TSU favors immediate moves to rename the country as Republic of Taiwan, the much more mainstream DPP under Chen Shui-bian has taken a more moderate position regarding independence during incumbency. At the same time the Chen administration has moved to promote a separate Taiwanese identity and give official recognition to Taiwan's de facto independence from the mainland such as by equating Taiwan with the Republic of China. The front-runners for the DPP nomination are all considered more moderate then Chen Shui-bian.

The KMT party line is against one country, two systems, but supports dialogue with the Chinese Communist Party under the "1992 Consensus" which presumes one China, different interpretations. During the campaign, Ma articulated a three noes policy, no independence, no unification, no use of force. He has also stated that during his first term of office, he will not discuss unification, make no changes to the ROC constitution, and will not personally meet Hu Jintao.

The DPP, in contrast, opposes recognizing One China (a prerequisite set by the PRC for negotiations), and no official talks have occurred under the Chen administration. The DPP also denies that there ever was a consensus in 1992. Both sides supports opening of the three links with mainland China, but with different focus on time and security. Difficulty comes from the PRC's refusal to negotiate unless the Taiwanese counterparty accepts the one-China principle under the 1992 consensus, which only allows the KMT to start three links in early incumbency.

=== Use of the name "Taiwan" ===
During the presidency of Chen Shui-bian, some state-controlled and state-owned firms have restored or added "Taiwan" to their names, such as renaming Chunghwa Post (Chinese Post) to Taiwan Post, the name it bore into the ROC period of rule on Taiwan; and Chiang Kai-Shek International Airport to Taiwan Taoyuan International Airport, its originally planned name. The naming controversy of the Chiang Kai-shek Memorial Hall and the legality of the Central Government's name-change administrative order was another topic of heated debate. Some observers viewed the name changes as signs of reactionary desinicization, while others viewed the name changing as signs of Taiwan localization movement carving a separate identity for Taiwan's name. The issue was, like most others, split strongly between Pan-Blue and Pan-Green supporters.

President-Elect Ma Ying-jeou pledged that he would revert the name changes of national landmarks, government organizations, and government-owned corporations conducted by the Chen Shui-bian administration. The Pan-Blue generally considered these name changes to be illegal because they were done through administrative orders, bypassing the Pan-Blue dominated legislature. Further examples of landmarks and organizations that were renamed are Chinese Petroleum Company and China Shipbuilding Corporation.

=== Green card issue ===
During the campaign, Democratic Progressive Party presidential candidate Frank Hsieh and DPP legislators questioned Ma Ying-jeou's loyalty to the Republic of China and to the people of Taiwan. Hsieh stated that Ma would not have become former President Chiang Ching-kuo's English secretary in 1977 if Chiang had known that Ma was in possession of a green card and his status as a US permanent resident.

Chiang instructed public servants not to keep a foot in both camps. Public servants working under him were not allowed to have green cards,

— Frank Hsieh "DPP continues attack on Ma Ying-jeou: Green With Envy?" Taipei Times (Thursday, January 31, 2008)

When asked, Ma Ying-jeou stated that he and his family members did not have green cards. He later clarified that he once possessed one. He also stated that he had not violated any law by possessing a US green card and that he never intended to hide the fact he was once a US permanent resident. He also maintained that possession of a green card, as well as having the status as a US permanent resident, was not against any government regulations at the time. Ma also stated that he believed that his green card was automatically invalidated when he applied for a US visa at the American Institute in Taiwan in 1985. Hsieh's questioning of his opponent's residency status extended to Ma's family members who carried US passports and citizenship, including Ma's US born daughter Lesley Weichung Ma. Ma's response was that

[My family members] have US passports, but they love Taiwan very much. Obtaining a green card has nothing to do with the issue of loyalty. It is only a way to live or travel in the US

— Ma Ying-jeou "DPP continues attack on Ma Ying-jeou: Green With Envy?" Taipei Times (Thursday, January 31, 2008)

Two TVBS political opinion poll conducted after Hsieh released his statement showed a slight dip in Ma Ying-jeou's support, but was well within the margin of error.

=== Hsieh office incident ===
Four pan-blue legislators attempted to enter the Hsieh election headquarters without permission, with the reason that they were there to investigate the claim that the government provided them office space for free. Hsieh's supporters surrounded them and blocked them as they tried to leave; fighting broke out. The pan-green called it an illegal search and said the pan-blue camp will carry out further similar actions if they controlled both the executive and legislature.

The legislators were labeled the "Four Idiots"(四個笨蛋) by the media and suspended from the party. Ma apologized for their actions on six separate occasions.

It is illegal to publish opinion polls in the ten days leading up to the election, but gambling syndicates changed their offering to "Ma wins by 200,000 votes" bets, down from "Ma wins by 500,000 votes" bets before the incident.

=== Chuang Kuo-jung's profanity incident ===
On March 16, 2008, standing for DPP candidate Frank Hsieh at a rally in Taichung, Chuang Kuo-jung, a deputy secretary for the Department of Education, called Ma Ying-jeou a "chicken" and further insulted his father and family. He mentioned a recent discovery by a magazine investigation that Ma's father Ma Ho-ling was proven to have slept with his foster daughter in the past. This drew the wrath of the Taiwanese public. With more investigations by broadcasting channels, the claims were deemed fake. DPP officials felt that the wording used by Chuang was insulting and inappropriate, and therefore, publicly apologized for Chuang's uncalled for and profane remarks. His speech was ridden with distaste and foul language deemed inappropriate for broadcast television, and had to be censored by NCC. Chuang initially resigned from his post as secretary of the Ministry of Education without an apology. Minister Tu accepted the resignations, after reservations. The next day, Chuang issued a formal apology through media.

Chuang's behavior has consequences affecting his teaching position at the National Chengchi University. As of June 19, 2008, the faculty panel has decided not to renew his teaching contract for the following school year.

=== Impact of unrest in Tibet ===
Hsieh seized on the 2008 unrest in Tibet to shift the focus of the campaign away from economic issues and accuse Ma of wanting to make Taiwan a "second Tibet". Ma was more cautious, and said he didn't know who was responsible for the violence. Government ministers tried to help Hsieh by ominously comparing a unified Taiwan with Tibet, and pressuring China to speak with the Dalai Lama. Ma himself tried to capitalize on the Tibet issue by suggesting a boycott of the 2008 Beijing Olympics. Hsieh fired back that it would only hurt the Chinese Taipei athletes, and that that proved that Ma was a "cold-hearted person". But while there was speculation that Tibet could become a swing issue, the final vote went as predicted.

== Opinion polls ==
Opinion polls were held by various news agencies and organizations in Taiwan during the election campaign. Before the election, the last of such polls was published on March 11, 2008 because, according to ROC law, opinion polls could not be published within ten days of the election. However, polls can still be taken during the ten days.

Polling Firm	Date	Source	Ma-Siew (KMT)	Hsieh-Su (DPP)	Undecided
TVBS	21 March 2008	PDF	51	29	20
TVBS	20 March 2008	PDF	53	31	16
TVBS	19 March 2008	PDF	52	30	18
TVBS	18 March 2008	PDF	50	31	19
TVBS	17 March 2008; Chuang Guo-rong's profanity incident	PDF	54	28	18
TVBS	14 March 2008	PDF	51	29	20
TVBS	13 March 2008	PDF	47	32	21
TVBS	12 March 2008; Hsieh office incident	PDF	47	30	23
TVBS	11 March 2008	PDF	54	29	17
TVBS	10 March 2008	PDF	53	29	18
Global Views (遠見雜誌)†	10 March 2008	HTML	61.7	38.3	--
China Times	9 March 2008; After the second debate	HTML 1 2	48.9	21.8	29.3
United Daily News	9 March 2008; After the second debate	HTML	52	22	26
TVBS	9 March 2008; After the second debate	PDF	50	31	19
South News	9 March 2008; After the second debate	HTML	41	38	21
United Daily News	March 5–9, 2008; Before the second debate	HTML	49	21	30
TVBS	7 March 2008	PDF	54	28	18
Apple Daily	7 March 2008	HTML	41.3	19.8	38.9
China Times	5 March 2008	HTML 1 2	52.7	21.1	26.2
Global Views (遠見雜誌)†	3 March 2008	PDF	61.8	38.2	--
United Daily News	29 February 2008	HTML	55	18	27
TVBS	29 February 2008	PDF	54	30	16
China Times	24 February 2008; After the first debate	HTML	48.6	22.7	28.7
United Daily News	24 February 2008; After the first debate	HTML	49	21	30
TVBS	24 February 2008; After the first debate	PDF	49	29	22
TVBS	22 February 2008	PDF	53	31	17
China Times	21 February 2008	HTML	47	22	31
Global Views (遠見雜誌)†	20 February 2008	PDF	63.3	36.7	--
TVBS	15 February 2008	PDF	53	29	19
United Daily News	14 February 2008; Spy incident	HTML	56	18	26
Apple Daily	13 February 2008	HTML	36.3	19.5	44.2
TVBS	31 January 2008	PDF	56	30	14
TVBS	29 January 2008; Green card incident	PDF	53	26	21
United Daily News	26 January 2008; Before the official registration of candidacy	HTML	54	23	23
China Times	25 January 2008	HTML	46.0	23.2	30.8
Global Views (遠見雜誌)†	18 January 2008	HTML 1 2	62.3	37.7	--
China Times via United Daily News	16 January 2008	HTML	52.8	20.8	26.4
TVBS	15 January 2008	PDF	56	26	18
United Daily News	13 January 2008; After the legislative election	HTML	60	18	22
China Times	13 January 2008; After the legislative election	HTML	51.4	19.9	28.7
China Times via United Daily News	9 January 2008	HTML	48.3	25.1	26.6
China Times via United Daily News	3 January 2008	HTML	47.5	22.5	30
United Daily News	28 December 2007; After Ma is cleared of corruption charges	HTML	52	23	25
China Times via United Daily News	28 December 2007; After Ma is cleared of corruption charges	HTML	45.3	24.2	30.5
Global Views (遠見雜誌)†	19 December 2007	PDF	60.8	39.2	--
China Times via United Daily News	20 November 2007	HTML	37.1	21.4	41.5
Global Views (遠見雜誌)†	19 November 2007	HTML	58.6	41.4	--
China Times via United Daily News	16 November 2007	HTML	36.9	22.1	41
China Times via United Daily News	8 November 2007	HTML	35.7	24.9	39.4
United Daily News	24 October 2007	HTML	50	25	25
Global Views (遠見雜誌)†	18 October 2007	HTML	59.4	40.6	--
United Daily News	22 September 2007; After Hsieh and Su not indicted in their discretionary funds cases	HTML	51	27	22
TVBS	19 September 2007	PDF	53	30	17
Global Views (遠見雜誌)†	20 September 2007	PDF	60.9	39.1	--
TVBS	28 August 2007	PDF	54	32	14
Global Views (遠見雜誌)†	21 August 2007	PDF	61.6	38.4	--
TVBS	15 August 2007	PDF	51	30	19
Era News via United Daily News	14 August 2007; After Ma is cleared of corruption charges	HTML	45.5	21.8	32.7
United Daily News	14 August 2007; After Ma is cleared of corruption charges	HTML	52	22	26
China Times via United Daily News	14 August 2007; After Ma is cleared of corruption charges	HTML	37.0	25.2	37.8
United Daily News	13 August 2007; After announcement of the Hsieh-Su ticket's formation	HTML	40	27	33
Kuomintang	9 August 2007	HTML	58.2	41.8	--
TVBS	2 August 2007	PDF	47	28	25
Global Views (遠見雜誌)†	July 2007	PDF	62.3	37.7	--
TVBS	11 July 2007	PDF	49	25	26
China Times	24 June 2007; After announcement of the Ma-Siew ticket's formation	HTML	40	20	40
United Daily News	24 June 2007; After announcement of the Ma-Siew ticket's formation	HTML	50	23	27
TVBS	24 June 2007; After announcement of the Ma-Siew ticket's formation	PDF	51	27	22
Global Views (遠見雜誌)†	June 2007	PDF	56.6	43.4	--
United Daily News	4 June 2007	HTML	58	17	25
TVBS	22 May 2007	PDF	50	25	25
Global Views (遠見雜誌)†	May 2007	HTML	57.3	42.7	--
China Times	May 2007	HTML	33	24	43
United Daily News	6 May 2007	HTML	43	28	29
TVBS	4 May 2007	DOC	50	29	21
United Daily News	29 April 2007	HTML	52	21	27
TVBS	29 January 2007	PDF	60	20	20

In terms of political orientation, TVBS, United Daily News, and China Times are considered Pan-Blue and pro-unification, while sources such as South News are considered Pan-Green and pro-independence.

Republic of China law also prohibits the publishing of any new opinion polling data in the last ten days leading up to the election.

† Numbers published by Global Views are calculated from a campaign indicator model.

== Mechanics ==
The election was by direct popular vote; a simple plurality was required to win. According to the Constitution of the Republic of China, all citizens of at least 20 years of age who have held household registration in the "Free Area of the Republic of China" (Taiwan, Penghu, Kinmen, Matsu, etc.) were eligible to vote. Under existing law, all voters travelled to their registered precincts to vote. Ballots were counted by hand at the precincts and the KMT declared victory less than three hours after the close of polls at 4:00 pm.

Because of KMT strategy of having people boycott the referendum, one major controversy, like in 2004 was the format of the polling, specifically as whether the referendum questions would be on the same or different ballots as the Presidency. While in 2004 the Central Electoral Commission allowed U-shaped line in which people would first cast a ballot for president and then cast a separate ballot for each of the two questions, the Commission ordered voters to cast all votes at once on separate ballots. Voters who choose not to cast a referendum ballot simply declined to pick up the extra two ballots.

== Results ==
Candidate	Running mate	Party	Votes	%
Ma Ying-jeou	Vincent Siew	Kuomintang	7,659,014	58.45
Frank Hsieh	Su Tseng-chang	Democratic Progressive Party	5,444,949	41.55
Total			13,103,963	100.00
Valid votes			13,103,963	99.11
Invalid/blank votes			117,646	0.89
Total votes			13,221,609	100.00
Registered voters/turnout			17,321,622	76.33
Source: CEC

Polls closed at 16:00 local time (UTC+8) on March 22, 2008. The final result, with all 14,401 precincts reporting, showed a landslide victory for the KMT candidate Ma Ying-jeou over the DPP candidate Frank Hsieh, with 7,658,724 votes, 58.45% of the popular vote for Ma against 5,445,239 votes, 41.55% for Hsieh. Turnout was 76.33%, with 13.2 million votes from 17.3 million eligible voters. The CEC released the final results with 100% of precincts reporting.

One local media commentator analyzed that their primary concern may be more economic than political, and quoted Bill Clinton's famous slogan, "It's the economy, stupid", as an explanation of the landslide victory for Ma. There was a sizeable number of Taiwanese who would prefer maintaining the status quo, a position favoured by Ma when he proclaimed that he would "not push for Taiwan independence or reunification with China if elected".

=== By administrative division ===
Subdivision	Electorate	1		2		Invalid	Turnout	Margin
Subdivision	Electorate	Frank Hsieh		Ma Ying-jeou		Invalid	Turnout	Margin
Subdivision	Electorate	Su Tseng-chang		Vincent Siew		Invalid	Turnout	Margin
Subdivision	Electorate	Votes	%	Votes	%	Invalid	Turnout	Margin
Taipei City	2,042,805	593,256	36.97%	1,011,546	63.03%	12,807	79.19%	418,290
Taipei County	2,878,477	866,915	38.94%	1,359,419	61.06%	21,169	78.08%	492,504
Keelung City	297,794	72,562	32.27%	152,327	67.73%	1,701	76.09%	79,765
Yilan County	346,921	123,700	48.58%	130,951	51.42%	1,991	73.98%	7,251
Taoyuan County	1,396,390	379,416	35.36%	693,602	64.64%	10,330	77.58%	314,186
Hsinchu County	358,433	73,178	25.98%	208,445	74.02%	2,723	79.33%	135,267
Hsinchu City	289,862	79,634	35.30%	145,930	64.70%	2,036	78.52%	66,296
Miaoli County	420,176	92,795	29.01%	227,069	70.99%	2,974	76.83%	134,274
Taichung County	1,135,237	353,706	41.16%	505,698	58.84%	8,761	76.47%	151,992
Taichung City	769,926	226,751	38.26%	365,979	61.74%	5,836	77.74%	139,228
Changhua County	981,262	309,134	42.41%	419,700	57.59%	7,558	75.05%	110,566
Nantou County	404,968	109,955	37.97%	179,630	62.03%	2,467	72.12%	69,675
Yunlin County	557,704	199,558	51.53%	187,705	48.47%	3,451	70.06%	-11,853
Chiayi County	427,808	166,833	54.44%	139,603	45.56%	2,936	72.32%	-27,230
Chiayi City	200,834	72,442	47.61%	79,713	52.39%	1,154	76.34%	7,271
Tainan County	854,240	354,409	56.15%	276,751	43.85%	5,614	74.54%	-77,658
Tainan City	578,159	216,815	49.29%	223,034	50.71%	3,843	76.74%	6,219
Kaohsiung City	1,163,546	440,367	48.41%	469,252	51.59%	7,112	78.79%	28,885
Kaohsiung County	953,610	373,900	51.41%	353,333	48.59%	5,859	76.88%	-20,567
Pingtung County	679,205	249,795	50.25%	247,305	49.75%	3,823	73.75%	-2,490
Taitung County	177,843	29,714	26.68%	81,668	73.32%	977	63.18%	51,954
Hualien County	260,820	40,003	22.52%	137,604	77.48%	1,970	68.85%	97,601
Penghu County	72,170	18,181	42.07%	25,037	57.93%	363	60.39%	6,856
Kinmen County	65,572	1,710	4.87%	33,384	95.13%	172	53.78%	31,674
Lienchiang County	7,860	220	4.84%	4,329	95.16%	19	58.12%	4,109
Source: CEC Overview Table CEC Visual Query

=== Maps ===

Result by County level

Result by Township level

Vote leader and vote share in township-level districts.

Vote leader in county-level districts.

Swing between the two major parties from the previous presidential election.

Winner vote lead over runner-up by township/city or district.

Size of lead between the two tickets.

== Reactions ==
=== Domestic reactions ===
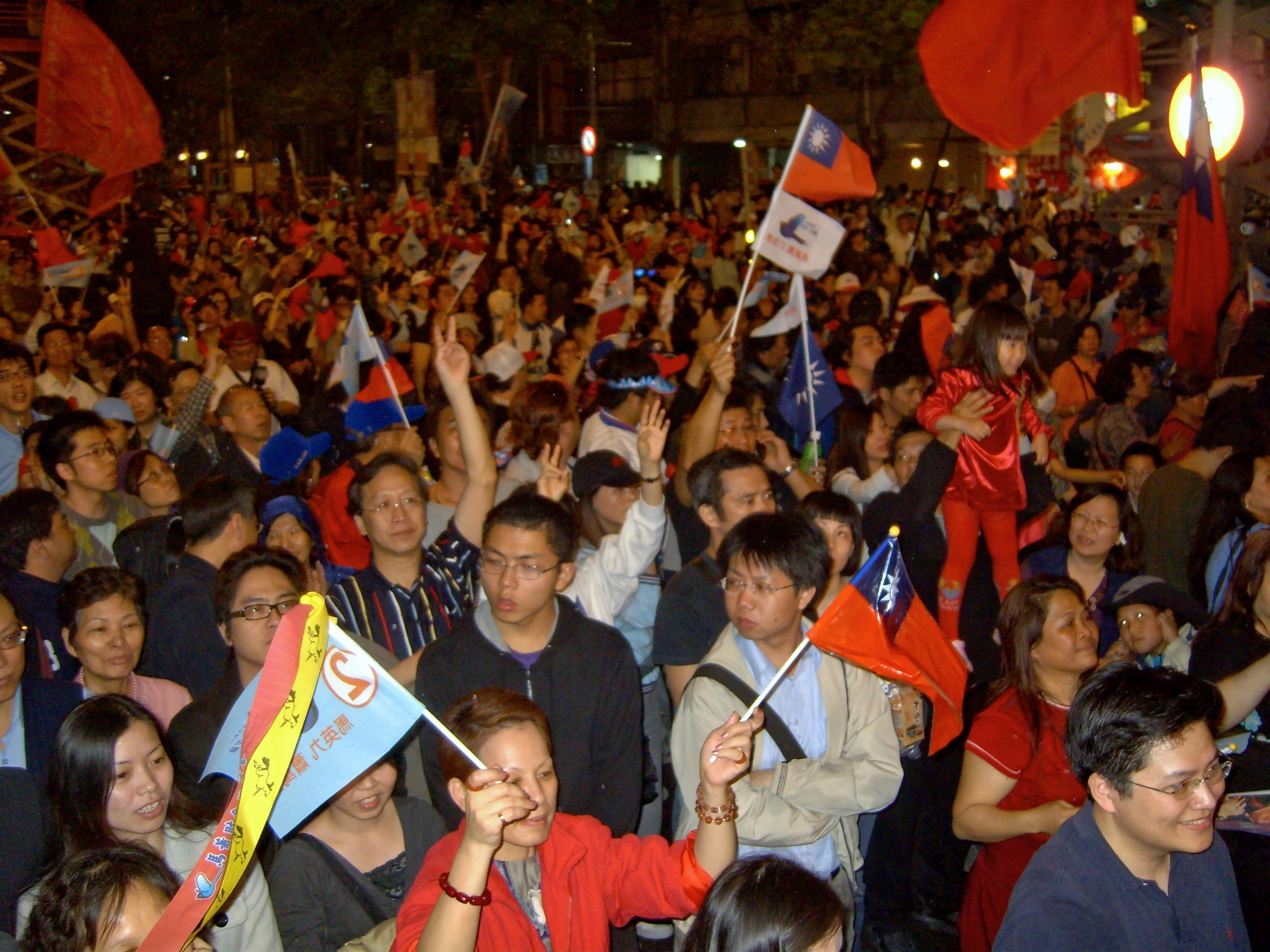
Ma Ying-jeou supporters in Taipei in a victory celebration.

In various KMT headquarters throughout Taiwan, celebrations of the party's landslide victory took place. The largest event was located at the Main KMT Headquarters in Taipei. Former Chairman Lien Chan, Legislative Yuan Speaker Wang Jin-pyng, Chairman Wu Po-hsiung were presented and celebrated with the large crowd. At 7:30 pm, Presidential-elect Ma Ying-jeou came out and spoke about what is expected of his new government when it begins office on May 20, 2008.

Many DPP supporters were very disappointed with the results of the election. Various DPP members went on stage at the party's Central Headquarters in Taipei and apologised to the Taiwanese people. Runner-up Presidential candidate Frank Hsieh stated that the result should be considered a blow to himself rather than a blow to Taiwan's young democracy. He pledged he would never again run for public office. The DPP leaders ended the day by bowing down to the crowd.

After a press conference on March 23 where Ma stated that he will work to open up the Three Links and improve cross-strait relations, Taiwan's stock market saw a large rise. The accumulated index jumped 534 points to 9049. 1100 listed companies saw their share prices rise. Of these, financial stocks all rose to trading limit levels, with transportation companies, speculated to benefit from improved relations with mainland China, also quickly reaching price rise limits. Other sectors that saw strong rises include large conglomerates, real property, electronics and technology.

=== PRC reactions ===
Consistently with its silence before the election, the PRC government refrained from commenting directly on the election results, and PRC media, which follows instructions on reporting from the government, has been very quiet as to the result of the elections. Also consistently with its behaviour before the election, the Taiwan Affairs Office of the State Council of the People's Republic of China commented on the failure of the two United Nations-related referendums held concurrently with the election, stating that the results showed the lack of popular support for independence in Taiwan. The Bureau also expressed optimism for the two governments to work together to maintain cross-strait peace and aid development in future. It is speculated that the mainland government would be pleased with the result.

While also refraining from commenting directly on the results, the People's Daily, the official newspaper of the Chinese Communist Party prominently displayed the election results, including the photos and brief biographies of the winning candidates, on its website. This, speculated Hong Kong's Ming Pao, showed signs of positive interaction between the two governments in future.

=== Other reactions ===
Singapore was the first country to send official congratulatory messages about the election results. It has since been the only country to do so together with the United States. China has thus far not responded to these messages.

- Singapore: Known to have good relations with both Republic of China and the People's Republic of China, the Singapore Ministry of Foreign Affairs issued a statement to congratulate Dr Ma Ying-jeou on his election, saying "As a long-standing friend of Taiwan, Singapore will continue to maintain good relations with Taiwan based on our 'One China' policy.' We look forward to better cross-strait relations."
- United States: President George W. Bush congratulated Ma Ying-jeou on his election victory, saying the United States will "continue to maintain close unofficial ties with the people on Taiwan through the American Institute in Taiwan in accordance with our long standing one China policy, our three Joint Communiqués with the People's Republic of China, and the Taiwan Relations Act."
- Canada: Minister of Foreign Affairs Maxime Bernier issued a press release on the Department of Foreign Affairs and International Trade website congratulating Ma Ying-jeou and also complimented the "smooth and orderly" electoral process, "demonstrating that democracy is laying down strong roots." Furthermore, he stated: "I also welcome Ma Ying-jeou’s central election commitment to improve cross-strait relations with China. This is consistent with Canada’s long-standing position that advocates for peaceful dialogue between the concerned parties."

Most other countries chose to issue general statements without specifically congratulating anyone:

- Germany: German foreign minister Frank-Walter Steinmeier stated "The German government hails the election in Taiwan. Germany supports the democratic values of Taiwan and the economic development of the island". He also said that he hoped for a "peaceful dialogue" between Taipei and Beijing.
- Japan: Foreign Minister Masahiko Kōmura says that "Japan hopes that the issue surrounding Taiwan will be resolved peacefully by direct dialogue between the parties concerned on the Taiwan Straits and that dialogue will resume soon for that purpose", while avoiding to evaluate the election results directly. He further stressed that Japan "intends to maintain Japan-Taiwan relations as a working relationship on a non-governmental basis".
- United Kingdom: Foreign Secretary David Miliband issued a statement on the Foreign and Commonwealth Office website saying "The successful Presidential elections in Taiwan today are testament to Taiwan's vibrant democracy. The forthcoming change of administration is a real opportunity to renew efforts to improve cross-Strait relations. I hope that the Chinese Government and the new administration will now engage in direct dialogue to resolve differences and find a peaceful solution to the Taiwan question, acceptable to the populations on both sides of the Straits."

== See also ==
- History of the Republic of China
- Politics of the Republic of China
