= Republic of China general election, 2008 =

Republic of China general election, 2008 may refer to

- 2008 Republic of China legislative election
- 2008 Republic of China presidential election
