= Mavis Ma =

Taiwanese politician (born 1945)

Ma Yi-nan (born 1945) is a Taiwanese politician affiliated with the Kuomintang. She is the eldest sister of Ma Ying-jeou, the former president of Taiwan, and the eldest daughter of Ma He-ling. She has held positions such as a Central Committee member and Central Review Committee member of the Kuomintang. Mavis Ma holds dual citizenship of the Republic of China (Taiwan) and the United States and has lived in the United States for many years.

== Biography ==
Mavis Ma was born in Chongqing in China. Her father, Ma He-ling, and her mother, Qin Houxiu, met while studying at the Central Political School (now National Chengchi University) during the Second Sino-Japanese War. They married in 1944 and Mavis Ma was born in 1945. She is the eldest child in the family and the older sister of Ma Ying-jeou.

At the end of 1945, Ma He-ling and Qin Houxiu moved to Taiwan for work related to post-war recovery. They returned to Hunan in 1947, leaving Mavis Ma in the care of her grandmother in Ningxiang, Hunan, where she was raised.

In 1948, following the outbreak of the Chinese Civil War, Ma He-ling brought his wife and daughter, Mavis Ma, to Taiwan. By 1949, they moved to Hong Kong, awaiting the rest of the family’s arrival.

In 1952, Ma He-ling moved his entire family from Hong Kong to Taiwan. Mavis Ma grew up in Taiwan, attending Taipei First Girls' High School and later enrolling at National Taiwan University. She initially majored in foreign languages but later transferred to the Department of Plant Pathology and Microbiology, where she graduated.

In 1966, Mavis Ma was hired by Chen Youming to take a university entrance exam on behalf of a female candidate, Chen Jiaxing. However, due to poor results, Chen Jiaxing was not admitted. In 1967, Mavis Ma went to the United States to study at the University of Massachusetts Amherst, majoring in biology. The same year, the university entrance exam impersonation scandal broke out. Mavis Ma was implicated but was not prosecuted.

Mavis Ma married Feng Danhe, who worked for the New York Metropolitan Transit Authority. She later worked as a researcher at the Brookhaven National Laboratory in the United States. After acquiring U.S. citizenship, she brought her family to the U.S. for education and residence.

After her brother Ma Ying-jeou became the mayor of Taipei in 1998, Mavis Ma returned to Taiwan in 2001 to serve as the Vice General Manager of the Development Department at China Chemical & Pharmaceutical Co. In January 2004, she was also appointed as an unpaid director of China Chemical's subsidiary, China Chemical Health, and was later named the chairwoman of Shunji Biotechnology and Shengzhan Biotechnology.

In 2007, during Ma Ying-jeou's presidential campaign, Mavis Ma actively supported her brother’s election. She publicly supported Tainan City Council Speaker Wu Jianbao, who was involved in bribery and match-fixing allegations, and was also reported to have met with Zhang Anle, a leader of the Bamboo Union gang, in China. When Taichung legislator Jiang Lianfu was under investigation for election bribery, Mavis Ma represented her brother and expressed support.

During Ma Ying-jeou’s tenure as mayor of Taipei in 2008, Mavis Ma, serving as Vice General Manager of China Chemical Pharmaceutical, was accused of using her influence to secure procurement contracts from Taipei City Hospital. After a report was filed, the Ministry of Justice imposed a fine of over NT$140 million on China Chemical for violating conflict-of-interest regulations. Following two appeals by China Chemical, the fine was reduced to nearly NT$100 million.

== Family ==
Mavis Ma's husband, Feng Danhe, worked for the New York Metropolitan Transit Authority and retired to Taiwan with her. After returning to Taiwan, he participated in the planning of the Taipei MRT and served as a consultant for the Kaohsiung MRT. He later became a supervisor for Synzyme Technologies. Feng Danhe died on June 17, 2014, at National Taiwan University Hospital, at the age of 77.

== Controversial events ==
=== Employment as a university entrance exam impersonator ===
On November 21, 1967, the Ministry of Justice’s Investigation Bureau Chief Shen Zhi Yue announced the bust of a group involved in the university entrance exam impersonation scandal. This group, which included Zhao Bingqing (a former official of the Ministry of Education), Ren Yucheng, Chen Youming, and Xie Qingshan, employed university students to take the exams on behalf of high school students. It was revealed that Ma Yi Nan was hired by Chen Youming in 1966 to impersonate a student for the university entrance exam. She was later reprimanded by her father for her involvement in the scandal.

=== Public scolding by father ===
On April 24, 2005, during a rally for Ma Ying-jeou’s campaign for party chairman, Ma Ying-jeou’s father, Ma Herling, publicly scolded Ma Yi Nan, calling her the "biggest troublemaker."

=== Supporting alleged corrupt KMT candidates ===
In the fall of 2007, Ma Yi Nan campaigned for Wu Jianbao, the KMT Speaker of the Tainan County Council, who was facing criminal charges for illegal sand mining, bribery, and match-fixing scandals. Wu was later sentenced to jail and lost his political office. Ma Yi Nan also supported Jiang Lianfu, a KMT legislator from Taichung County, during a bribery investigation.

=== Violation of conflict of interest laws ===
In 2001, Ma Yi Nan was appointed as the vice president and board member of China Chemical & Pharmaceutical Co. (CCPC). During Ma Ying-jeou’s tenure as Taipei mayor, CCPC and its subsidiary, Zhonghua Yuming, secured pharmaceutical contracts worth over NT$140 million from the Taipei City government’s hospitals. This raised concerns over conflicts of interest, and the Ministry of Justice later fined CCPC NT$14 million for violating the Conflict of Interest Avoidance Act. The fine was reduced after appeals but still remained at NT$9.8 million.

=== Meeting with fugitive Black Gang leader Zhang Anle ===
In February 2008, the Next Magazine reported that Ma Yi Nan met with Zhang Anle, the fugitive leader of the Bamboo Union gang, in Shenzhen, China. During their meeting, they attended a fundraising event for Ma Ying-jeou's campaign. The Ma Ying-jeou campaign denied any improper involvement, claiming it was a "coincidental encounter." However, this raised suspicions of ties between the KMT and criminal organizations.

=== Ma Ying-jeou's complaints revealed ===
In September 2009, Ma Yi Nan revealed an email in which Ma Ying-jeou expressed frustration over the criticism he received for his ineffective disaster response during Typhoon Morakot. The email caused controversy, with Ma Ying-jeou later apologizing for any offense caused to the public.

=== Allegations of facilitating land development for Da-Hsin Engineering ===
In November 2011, Next Magazine reported that Ma Yi Nan allegedly facilitated a meeting between Da-Hsin Engineering’s Vice Chairman Wang Ren-zhi and Taiwan Power Company’s Chairman Chen Gui-ming to discuss land development projects. The magazine suggested that Ma Yi Nan’s actions resembled those of former President Chen Shui-bian’s alleged corruption patterns.

=== Allegations of organizing criminal groups for Ma Ying-jeou’s campaign ===
In November 2011, former legislator Zhou Wuli accused Ma Ying-jeou of using his sister, Ma Yi Nan, to organize local politicians with criminal backgrounds in support of his presidential campaign. Zhou claimed that Ma Yi Nan helped mobilize politicians with ties to the underworld to gather votes for Ma Ying-jeou.

=== Involvement in the Twin Towers scandal ===
In April 2013, Next Magazine reported that Ma Yi Nan used her connections to help Da-Hsin Engineering secure a partnership in the development of the "Twin Towers" project in Taipei. However, Ma Yi Nan denied any wrongdoing, despite evidence that her involvement played a key role in getting Da-Hsin into the project.

=== Supporting the controversial Dato Oil company ===
In October 2013, Ma Yi Nan attended the opening ceremony of a Dato Longji (DTC) factory, which was later embroiled in a scandal over the sale of adulterated cooking oil. She was accused of being a “gatekeeper” for the company due to her high-level connections, including her attendance at the event alongside high-ranking KMT officials.
