= De facto Taiwan independence =

- Traditional Chinese: 實質台獨
- Simplified Chinese: 实质台独
Transcriptions
Standard Mandarin
- Hanyu Pinyin: Shízhì táidú

Alternative Chinese name
- Traditional Chinese: 事實台獨
- Simplified Chinese: 事实台独
Transcriptions
Standard Mandarin
- Hanyu Pinyin: Shìshí táidú

De facto Taiwan independence is a political term used in the People's Republic of China (PRC) as one of the categories of Taiwan independence. The PRC views de facto independence as promoting the notion that Taiwan is de facto an independent sovereign state and not subordinate to the People's Republic of China. This term is primarily used to distinguish it from de jure Taiwan independence. A representative figure of this approach is former president Lee Teng-hui, who believed that Taiwan is already a sovereign state in the current situation, has never been ruled by the People's Republic of China, and therefore does not need to publicly declare independence from the PRC. This faction advocates maintaining the status quo, using the Republic of China as the official name, and continuing to pursue goals such as deepening democracy, normalizing the state, economic development, and participating in the United Nations, rather than pursuing name rectification and constitutional reform, which would increase the difficulty of participating in the international community. After President Tsai Ing-wen took office, the People's Republic of China also regarded her as the successor to this approach. President Lai Ching-te has also been considered by PRC to be continuing this approach.

In the definition of the People's Republic of China, this also falls under the category of Taiwan independence. However, supporters of the Taiwan independence movement do not consider this to be Taiwan independence, instead referring to it as Dutai or Huadu.

== Overview ==
Similar ideas emerged during the rule of Chiang Kai-shek and Chiang Ching-kuo, and were referred to as Dutai.

Lee Teng-hui is seen as the main representative of de facto Taiwan independence. He argues that Taiwan is already an independent country in fact Taiwan, Penghu, Kinmen and Matsu. He believes that Taiwan has a special state-to-state relationship with the People's Republic of China and that there is no need to promote a separate Taiwan independence movement or pursue the change of the national name to Taiwan. The special state-to-state relationship is considered by PRC as one of the methods of de facto Taiwan independence.

== See also ==
- Cross-strait relations
- Political status of Taiwan
