= Hei Seki =

Japanese commentator and politician (born 1962)

- 石 平
- Seki in 2026

Member of the House of Councillors
- Incumbent
- Assumed office 29 July 2025
- Constituency: National PR

Personal details
- Born: Shi Ping; 30 January 1962 (age 64) Chengdu, Sichuan, China
- Party: Innovation (since 2025)
- Education: Peking University; Kobe University

Hei Seki (石 平, Seki Hei; born 30 January 1962), (Note: Chinese: 石平; pinyin: Shí Píng) also known by his Japanese name, Yo Kitano (北埜 陽, Kitano Yō), is a Chinese-Japanese commentator and politician, serving as a member of the House of Councillors since 2025. He is known for criticising the Chinese Communist Party, support of Taiwan as the Republic of China and in the 2010s having held revisionist remarks on the war crimes of Imperial Japan.

== Career ==
Shi Ping was born in Chengdu, Sichuan on 30 January 1962, and his parents are university instructors. During the Cultural Revolution, his parents were sent down to a farm, while Shi was raised by his grandfather, who was a traditional Chinese medicine physician in rural Sichuan. His grandfather had secretly taught the Analects to Shi. He died from lung cancer when Shi was 11 years old.

Shi attended Peking University and studied philosophy in 1980. In 1982, he participated in the democracy movement. He went to study in Japan in 1988, and naturalized in 2007.

On 20 July 2025, Seki was elected as a member of the House of Councillors in the national proportional representation block for 47,939 votes.

On a trip to Taiwan, Seki stated that "Taiwan is the Republic of China" and that Taiwan is an independent country, not part of the People's Republic of China.

=== Chinese sanctions ===
On 8 September 2025, the government of the People's Republic of China banned Seki from entering mainland China, Hong Kong, and Macau. A statement from the Chinese Foreign Affairs Ministry stated Seki "has long spread fallacies on issues including Taiwan, the Diaoyu Islands, history, Xinjiang, Tibet and Hong Kong". This was in response to Seki's critical statements to the People's Republic of China. In response Japan issued an diplomatic protest.
