= Ma Ho-ling =

Republic of China official; father of Ma Ying-jeou

- 馬鶴凌
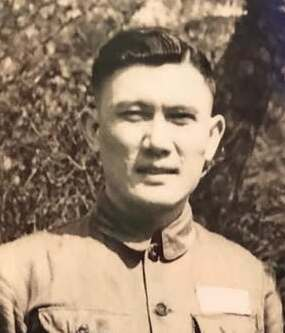
- Ma in 1955
- Born: 9 November 1920; Xiangtan, Hunan, China
- Died: 1 November 2005 (aged 84); Taipei, Taiwan
- Education: Central Political Institute (BA)
- Political party: Kuomintang
- Spouse: Chin Hou-hsiu
- Children: Ma Yinan, Mai Naixi, Ma Bingru, Ma Ying-jeou, Ma Lijun

Chinese name
- Traditional Chinese: 馬鶴凌
- Simplified Chinese: 马鹤凌
Transcriptions
Standard Mandarin
- Hanyu Pinyin: Mǎ Hèlíng
- Wade–Giles: Ma^{3} Ho^{4}-ling^{2}

Ma Ho-ling (Chinese: 馬鶴凌; pinyin: Mǎ Hèlíng; Wade–Giles: Ma^{3} Ho^{4}-ling^{2}; 9 November 1920 – 1 November 2005) was a Chinese politician and Kuomintang (KMT) party official. He was the father of Taiwanese president Ma Ying-jeou.

== Biography ==
Ma was born in Xiangtan, Hunan in 1920. He graduated from Central Political School in Nanking (the predecessor of National Chengchi University in Taiwan) with a degree in public administration.

While he lived in Hong Kong, he started an open-air cha chaan teng in Lai Chi Kok Amusement Park. At that time, he then used three hundred dollars to hire his future wife, Chin Hou-hsiu (1922–2013). He married her in 1943 and then came to Taiwan in 1948. The couple had four daughters (including Mavis Ma) and one son. The fourth child and the only son is Ma Ying-jeou.

Ma was a Director at Youth Supervision Committee of the Executive Yuan and Vice Chairman of Performance Committee of Kuomintang.

Ma Ho-ling had a strong influence on his son Ma Ying-jeou. In an interview in 2004, he said that he wanted his son to run for president. But in 2005, he strongly opposed his son to run for Kuomintang's Chairmanship and even threatened to commit suicide if Ma Ying-jeou would not give up his candidacy.

Ma Ho-ling died of a heart attack in 2005.

During the 2008 presidential elections, Chuang Kuo-jung, an official of the Ministry of Education, accused Ma Ho-ling of having affairs with various women. After arousing public anger, Chuang apologized and stepped down from his post.
