= Second Republic of China (Taiwan) =

Historiographical term

In Taiwan's political history, the term "Second Republic of China" (Chinese: 中華民國第二共和) is used in historical research on the Republic of China (Taiwan) and was first proposed by Japanese political scientist Masahiro Wakabayashi; it may be useful in describing Taiwan's democratization and the 'Taiwanization of the Republic of China.'

The period referred to as "Second Republic of China" refers to Taiwan after May 1, 1991; Lee Teng-hui's government abolished Temporary Provisions against the Communist Rebellion and promulgated the Additional Articles of the Constitution of the Republic of China. This centered on the Chinese identity and distinguished it from the "First Republic of China" (Chinese: 中華民國第一共和) before May 1, 1991, which was Kuomintang's one-party system. The state agency that was established afterwards actually represents the Taiwanese people, not the mainland Chinese, and the legitimacy of the state power's rule also comes from the mandate of the Taiwanese people.

== Definition of the concept ==
Basically, the target of the concept "Second Republic of China" refers to the Republic of China after May 1, 1991. After this, because the Republic of China government terminated the Period of mobilization for the suppression of Communist rebellion and abolished the Temporary Provisions, and at the same time promulgated the Additional Articles of the Constitution of the Republic of China, therefore, the ROC "constructed state organs that only represent the people of Taiwan, and the legitimacy of state power and governance only comes from the authorization of the people of Taiwan, completely unrelated to the people of mainland China". In the words of Ruan Ming, "The First Republic of China born of the Xinhai Revolution was in mainland China, not in Taiwan; today's Second Republic of China is in Taiwan, not in mainland China".

== Taiwanization of the Republic of China ==
In the book Taiwan: Divided Nation and Democratization (台灣：分裂國家與民主化 / 1994), Japanese scholar Masahiro Wakabayashi, when discussing the process of democratization of Taiwan's political system, proposed a set of explanatory analytical concepts, considering that the authoritarian system in Taiwan during the rule of the two Chiangs had the following characteristics:

1. Quasi-Leninist party-state
2. "Legal orthodoxy" (法統) system
3. Ethnic dual structure of political elites
4. Dual clientelism

However, after a series of changes and reform measures starting in the mid-1970s, he made the following predictions regarding possible changes to these characteristics after the 1990s:

1. Mitigation or breakdown of Kuomintang political monopoly → "LDP-ization" of the Kuomintang (becoming a "one-party dominant" system politically)
2. De-civil-war-ization and liberalization → "Second Republic of China System"
3. Breaking the dual structure → Taiwanization
4. Breaking the dual structure → "Money politics" in parliamentary elections, "factionalization" in parliamentary operations

Among these, regarding the second point, in Wakabayashi's own words:

After the lifting of martial law in Taiwan, in May 1991, the "Temporary Provisions Effective During the Period of National Mobilization for Suppression of the Communist Rebellion", which essentially froze the Constitution, were abolished. Immediately following, due to the expansion of student movements in Taipei, the "Statute for the Punishment of Rebellion" was also repealed. These all formalized the transition away from Taiwan's long-term civil war stance with the mainland and the Chinese Communist Party. For Taiwan's political system, democratization meant "de-civil-war-ization". At the end of 1991, the "Ten-Thousand-Year Congress" finally retired, and the entity of "legal orthodoxy" thus vanished.

At this point, what inevitably appeared directly in Taiwan's political order was the "Constitution of the Republic of China". However, this law was drafted in the 1940s with "all China" as its subject, so it clearly could not be applied to Taiwan as it was. Thus, the political situation quickly centered around constitutional issues (territorial scope, national title, central government system, etc.). "Democratization by installment" entered its final phase = "constitutional reform", where the Kuomintang's "constitutional amendment" and the Democratic Progressive Party's "drafting a new constitution" = "Taiwan independence" claims competed in the market of ideas. (Note: The Japanese edition of this book, Taiwan: Divided Nation and Democratization (台灣：分裂國家と民主化), was published in 1992 by the University of Tokyo Press. Reference here is to the 1994 Chinese translation edition.) Wakabayashi then stated in the subsection titled "Second Republic of China System":

If "constitutional reform" were "drafting a new constitution" as claimed by the opposition party, it would naturally be so; even if it ended with "constitutional amendment" as claimed by the Kuomintang, it had nothing to do with the opinions of the populace of mainland China, which was the original target of the source of law for national political institutions, the "Constitution of the Republic of China". In this regard, this work by Wakabayashi seems to be the first time the concept of "Second Republic of China" appeared in relevant literature, referring to the change in the nature of state power in Taiwan's state apparatus following democratic procedures.

== Lee Teng-hui's adoption of the "Second Republic of China system" ==
After Lee Teng-hui was elected as the first directly elected president of the Republic of China in 1996, he stated publicly on several occasions: "Taiwan is a sovereign and independent country, its national title is the Republic of China" or "The Republic of China is a sovereign country, its territorial scope is in Taiwan, Penghu, Kinmen, and Matsu". On July 9, 1999, during an interview with Deutsche Welle (see Two-State Theory), Lee further clarified his position:

Since the 1991 constitutional amendment, cross-strait relations have been defined as state-to-state, or at least special state-to-state relations, rather than an internal "One China" relationship between a legitimate government and a rebel group, or a central government and a local government. Therefore, your mention that the Beijing government views Taiwan as a "renegade province" completely ignores historical and legal facts.

When commenting on the nationalist discourse of the Kuomintang under Lee Teng-hui's leadership, political scientist Lin Chia-lung used the concept of "Second Republic of China" to describe the Taiwanese state system established by Lee, (Note: However, note that Lin Chia-lung did not cite Wakabayashi's views in this paper.) and stated that during an interview with Lee Teng-hui on October 19, 1998 for research purposes, Lee directly raised the concept of "Second Republic of China".

=== Asia's Strategy ===
In July 2000, after stepping down from the presidency, Lee Teng-hui co-authored the book Asia's Strategy (亞洲的智略) with Japanese writer Mineo Nakajima. In this book, Lee systematically proposed for the first time the idea that the Republic of China in Taiwan had moved past the era of rule by the two Chiangs and transformed into a "Second Republic".

Lee emphasized in the book that the Republic of China in Taiwan can roughly be divided into two periods. The period of rule by Chiang Kai-shek and Chiang Ching-kuo was the first period, because the constitutions were drawn up during the Chinese Civil War. As for the present, Taiwan's constitution has not only undergone major amendments, but the former Legislative Yuan has also been fully re-elected, senior legislators have retired, the National Assembly has been streamlined, Taiwan Province has been "streamlined", and the president is directly elected by the people. Having experienced these major changes, Taiwan's constitution and government structure have been reorganized, which is the Second Republic.

Lee further pointed out in the book that the Republic of China is a sovereign independent country, and the Second Republic of Taiwan's Republic of China is naturally also a sovereign independent country, with a solid theoretical foundation.

=== "Taiwan's 21st Century National Goals" published by Taiwan Advocates ===
In 2002, Taiwan Advocates (群策會), chaired by Lee Teng-hui, gathered more than 30 experts and scholars and held more than 20 meetings over six months to draft ten major "Taiwan 21st Century National Goals", the first of which was "Establishing Taiwan's national identity". (Note: Later, Taiwan Advocates officially published the book in 2003, see Taiwan Advocates [Taiwan 21st Century National Goals] Research Group.) In the section titled "Composing the 'Second Republic' with 'General Will'", the Research Group of "Taiwan 21st Century National Goals" again used the concept of "Second Republic of China" and pointed out:

1. In 1991, the Temporary Provisions Effective During the Period of National Mobilization for Suppression of the Communist Rebellion were abolished; Taiwan recognized the existence of the People's Republic of China, and declared that the governing power of the Republic of China only reached Taiwan, Penghu, Kinmen, and Matsu.
2. In 1991 and 1992, the National Assembly and Legislative Yuan were fully re-elected; the people of Taiwan directly elected their own members of parliament, and the symbolic and substantive "legal orthodoxy" of the Republic of China broke from then on.
3. In 1996, the people of Taiwan directly elected the president; Taiwan's politics "transformed" from authoritarianism to democracy, and the overall situation was finally settled. More importantly, after six constitutional amendments, the democratic spirit of popular sovereignty realized the construction of the Republic of China's "Second Republic". From then on, Taiwan no longer returned to traditional China's cycle of order and chaos; walking toward democracy is walking toward the world, officially severing ties with feudal China. (Note: This quote is taken from the online version of "Taiwan's 21st Century National Goals". This version lists the publication date as November 10, 2000, which may be an error; other data sources show that "Taiwan's 21st Century National Goals" was officially published in December 2002.)

== Application of this concept by relevant scholars and politicians ==
=== Relevant scholars ===
In fact, after Lee Teng-hui proposed the concept of "Second Republic of China" in Taiwan, many scholars successively began to adopt this concept to explain Taiwan's current political system. For example, Ruan Ming, former advisor to Hu Yaobang, who acquired ROC nationality in 2002, once wrote about the fluidity of the concept of "Republic of China". He said: Taiwan's national title today is "Republic of China". "Republic of China" is a changing historical concept. The Republic of China born of the Xinhai Revolution was in mainland China, not in Taiwan; at that time, Taiwan was a Japanese colony ceded by the Qing dynasty government. After World War II, Japan was defeated and relinquished Taiwan, which was occupied by the ROC government on behalf of the Allies post-war. Therefore, from 1945 to 1949, the ROC government once ruled both sides of the Strait, mainland China and Taiwan. In 1949, the People's Republic of China was born in mainland China, and the ROC government abandoned mainland China and moved to Taiwan, forming the historical fact of the Republic of China and the People's Republic of China coexisting on opposite sides of the Taiwan Strait.

In addition, he also adopted Lee Teng-hui's concept of "Second Republic of China" to describe Taiwan's current political status. He stated: On May 1, 1991, the ROC government terminated the Period of National Mobilization for Suppression of the Communist Rebellion, abolished the Temporary Provisions, and promulgated the Additional Articles of the Constitution of the ROC, effectively confirming that the ROC's territorial sovereignty is in Taiwan, Penghu, Kinmen, and Matsu, not in mainland China. Through direct election of Taiwanese parliamentary representatives and the Taiwanese president by the Taiwanese people, followed by party turnover and peaceful transfer of power, Taiwan has realized national democratization and localization. This is the Second Republic of China. That is to say, the First Republic of China born of the Xinhai Revolution was in mainland China, not in Taiwan; today's Second Republic of China is in Taiwan, not in mainland China. Besides Ruan Ming, other scholars have also begun using the concept of "Second Republic of China" to describe Taiwan's current political system, such as Wu Chih-chung from the Department of Political Science at Soochow University.

=== Politicians from the Democratic Progressive Party ===
Taking Chen Shui-bian of the Democratic Progressive Party as an example, although he does not seem to have used this concept directly; however, some related news reports have pointed out that to a certain extent, the concept of "Second Republic of China" can actually be used to describe Chen Shui-bian's idea regarding Taiwan drafting a new constitution. For example, in a 2003 report by Liberty Times journalist Tsou Ching-wen regarding Chen Shui-bian's "New Constitution Concept", she wrote: Regarding Chen Shui-bian proposing a timeline for a new constitution at the party anniversary convention, staff who understood the internal decision-making process pointed out that President Chen's new constitution concept could be described as a "Second Republic of China", not necessarily a "Republic of Taiwan". Chen Shui-bian believed that a presidential election is not just about choosing a president, but more importantly about choosing party philosophy, and all citizens must also choose a future for themselves, so he had to propose a vision for the entire team and the people to reflect upon and follow together. In addition, former Premier Frank Hsieh seemed to hold a very similar view. In an interview with Liberty Times journalists Tsou Ching-wen and Wang Bei-lin on February 13, 2005, he also told reporters: The Executive Yuan team promotes cross-party reconciliation, but Taiwan's subjectivity definitely remains unchanged; after multiple constitutional amendments, it is now "Taiwanization of the Republic of China", which can also be called a "Second Republic", and the two sides of the strait are in reality "two countries". In this regard, although prominent figures in the DPP have not used the concept of Second Republic of China directly in official settings, they seem to agree with such a statement.

=== Politicians from the Kuomintang ===
Many people in the Kuomintang have also raised the viewpoint of "Second Republic of China" in public settings and demanded that the party central committee incorporate it into the party's official policy. For instance, the "567 Alliance", composed of younger generations within the Kuomintang, once issued a manifesto stating, "The Kuomintang should quickly adopt 'Second Republic of China' and 'separation of three powers' as the direction of 'constitutional reform', recognize the 'state of cross-strait division', 'not advocate unification', and 'retain options for unification or independence'".

== See also ==
- Four-Stage Theory of the Republic of China
- Huadu (Taiwan)
- Republic of China on Taiwan
- Self-determination
- Taiwanese nationalism
