= Republic of China (Taiwan) (term) =

- Traditional Chinese: 中華民國（台灣）
- Simplified Chinese: 中华民国（台湾）
Transcriptions
Standard Mandarin
- Hanyu Pinyin: Zhōnghuá Mínguó (Táiwān)

Republic of China-Taiwan
- Traditional Chinese: 中華民國台灣
- Simplified Chinese: 中华民国台湾
Transcriptions
Standard Mandarin
- Hanyu Pinyin: Zhōnghuá Mínguó Táiwān

"Republic of China (Taiwan)" is one of the unofficial names for the Republic of China (ROC) used since 2005. Chen Shui-bian, the president of the Republic of China, introduced the term on the official websites of government departments such as the Presidential Office, the Ministry of Foreign Affairs, and the Government Information Office after 2005. "Republic of China" is the official legal name of the country, with "Taiwan" in parentheses as a footnote. This practice of using a footnote in English continues to this day. According to the special explanation made by the Presidential Office Public Affairs Office at the beginning of the revision, foreigners often confuse the "Republic of China" with the "People's Republic of China". It argues that the addition of "Taiwan" is to make a reasonable and clear distinction.

After Ma Ying-jeou became president in 2008, the Chinese annotation for "Taiwan" on the websites of governments at all levels was gradually removed, but the English word "Taiwan" was still retained, referring to the Republic of China as the representative of Taiwan. After Tsai Ing-wen became president in 2016, her government referred to the Republic of China as Taiwan on many official occasions, and the Chinese and English names became more similar.

In 2019, Tsai introduced the concept "Republic of China-Taiwan", which is the same as the Taiwan Consensus and is considered an extension of the two-states theory. This concept regards Taiwan identity and Republic of China identity as the same identity. According to the concept, Taiwan is the Republic of China and the Republic of China is Taiwan, which extends to "The Republic of China is a sovereign and independent country" and "Taiwan is a sovereign and independent country". The two can be interchanged and applied in domestic and foreign affairs, in official speeches, news and documents.

== Background ==
Taiwan in the Western Pacific region

In 1949, the Chinese Communist Party (CCP) established the People's Republic of China (PRC) on the mainland, while the Republic of China (ROC) has since only effectively controlled islands such as Taiwan, Penghu, Kinmen, and Matsu. United Nations General Assembly Resolution 2758 in 1971 deprived the ROC of its representation of "China". With Japan, the United States, and South Korea severing diplomatic relations with the ROC and recognizing the PRC, "China" gradually became the common name for the PRC, while "Taiwan" gradually became the common name for the ROC.

On 11 May 2002, the Taiwan Name Rectification Campaign was officially launched, with the goal of removing all names that implied "the Republic of China represents China". Starting in September 2003, the cover of the Republic of China passport was marked with the English word "TAIWAN".

== Introduction of the concept ==
On 30 July 2005, the Presidential Office of the Republic of China announced that the Presidential Office website would add "Taiwan" in parentheses after the name "Republic of China". The office stated that the reason for adding the annotation was that outsiders might mistake "Republic of China" for "People's Republic of China", which would cause confusion and inconvenience to all sectors; and that many international people or netizens would mistakenly believe that the website was the official website of the government of the People's Republic of China, and send letters to leaders of the People's Republic of China such as Hu Jintao and Wen Jiabao to it. At the same time as adding "Taiwan", the Presidential Office's English webpage was also changed to "Republic of China (Taiwan)".

In July 2005, the Presidential Office of the Republic of China added "Taiwan" after the country's name "Republic of China" for the first time, which was also one of the steps of the Taiwan name rectification movement. After the Presidential Office first used it, the Ministry of Foreign Affairs of the Republic of China and the Government Information Office at the time followed suit, and the Republic of China's embassies abroad also used it in the same way. Other agencies, such as the Ministry of Transportation of the Republic of China, did not add it on their websites. In addition, "Republic of China (Taiwan)" was also used in some official documents.

=== Reactions ===
- China: This move was considered by the People's Republic of China to be related to Chen Shui-bian's Four-Stage Theory of the Republic of China published at the same time, and the media in mainland China also interpreted this move as a declaration of "the Republic of China is Taiwan" in Chen Shui-bian's "Four Stages of the Republic of China". For example, Oriental News reported that "the Taiwan authorities' leader's office website added a note in parentheses after the Republic of China to Taiwan, which is consistent with Chen Shui-bian's "Four-Stage Theory".
- Japan: On 6 June 2008, the Tokyo Metropolitan Government announced that all its wards, municipalities and towns would begin accepting that residents of the Republic of China (Taiwan) fill in "Taiwan" in the nationality column of their resident registration certificate (similar to a household registration transcript for residents), making it the first administrative district in Japan to do so.
- United States: According to a report by the Central News Agency on 9 September 2008, the United States began accepting applications from Taiwanese immigrants who only filled in "Taiwan" in the original nationality field.

== Aftermath ==
In July 2007, the Presidential Office and the Ministry of Foreign Affairs removed the parentheses from the supplementary words for the country name (Taiwan) on their English websites and related documents, and enlarged the font and color of the English word for Taiwan; however, the Chinese websites and documents did not make any changes. On 20 May 2008, after Ma Ying-jeou of the Kuomintang took office as the president of the Republic of China, the word "Taiwan" added after "Republic of China" on the websites of the Presidential Office and the Ministry of Foreign Affairs was removed, leaving only the word "Taiwan" after the English name of the country.

Democratic Progressive Party (DPP) politician Yiong Con-ziin once wrote to the Liberty Times proposing to change the English name of the Republic of China to "Republic of Chunghwa" and remove "China". In June 2016, DPP legislator Wang Ting-yu proposed during a legislative interpellation of Foreign Minister David Lee to unify the English names used by the Republic of China in international organizations, such as Chinese Taipei and Taiwan, Penghu, Kinmen and Matsu Customs Area (TPKM), to Chung Hwa Min Kuo (a transliteration of the Chinese name of the Republic of China), but none of these proposals came to fruition.

== Republic of China-Taiwan ==
In 2017, after Tsai Ing-wen, a member of the Democratic Progressive Party, took office as the president of the Republic of China in 2016, the Legislative Yuan's website changed the English name "The Legislative Yuan of the Republic of China" to "Legislative Yuan, Republic of China (Taiwan)".

In 2019, Tsai formally proposed the term "Republic of China-Taiwan" in her National Day speech in 2019, advocating that national identity should not be divided into two different camps, the Republic of China and Taiwan, and that they should unite as one. Tsai mentioned "Republic of China-Taiwan" many times and said that "Republic of China-Taiwan" is the biggest consensus in Taiwan now, transcending the division between the pan-Blue Coalition and the pan-Green Coalition.

In early 2020, during the Taiwanese presidential election, Lin Ching-yi, spokesperson for Tsai Ing-wen's campaign office, mentioned in an interview with Deutsche Welle that "advocating unification may constitute treason" and resigned as a result. Tsai Ing-wen stated on her personal Facebook page that through democratic mechanisms, the people of Taiwan can find the greatest common denominator of national identity. She believes that "Republic of China-Taiwan" is the consensus of the people.

After the 2020 election, Tsai Ing-wen was interviewed by the BBC and asked whether she would declare Taiwan independence. Tsai Ing-wen said, "We do not need to declare ourselves an independent country." She added, "We are already an independent country and we call ourselves the Republic of China (Taiwan)." On 1 April 2020, Tsai Ing-wen reiterated that "Republic of China-Taiwan" is the greatest consensus of the people of Taiwan. In her inaugural address in 2020, President Tsai Ing-wen said: "Fellow citizens, over the past seventy years, the Republic of China-Taiwan has become increasingly resilient and united in the face of one challenge after another." The seventy years mentioned in this statement are from 1950 to 2020. In her speech on the 108th National Day of the Republic of China in 2020, Tsai Ing-wen stated that the six characters "Republic of China, Taiwan" are not the exclusive property of any political party, but rather represent a consensus across Taiwan as a whole.

We have walked this path together. No matter which party we belong to, as long as we are people living on this land, we cannot be separated. The Republic of China is not anyone's patent, and Taiwan is not something anyone can monopolize. The six words 'Republic of China, Taiwan' are absolutely not blue, nor will they be green. This is the biggest consensus in the whole society.

The Ministry of Foreign Affairs of the Republic of China responded to Wang Yi, Minister of Foreign Affairs of the People's Republic of China. On 9 March 2021, Ou Jiang'an, spokesperson for the Ministry of Foreign Affairs of the Republic of China, said: Taiwan has never been a part of the People's Republic of China. "Republic of China-Taiwan" is a sovereign state.

The Ministry of Foreign Affairs of the Republic of China stated regarding the meeting between Chinese and American officials from 18 to 19 March 2021: "Chinese officials made erroneous and distorted statements during or after the meeting regarding the sovereignty of Taiwan belonging to China. However, these statements are contrary to the facts and violate the will of the people of Taiwan. The Ministry of Foreign Affairs emphasizes that the Republic of China-Taiwan is a sovereign and independent democratic country. Sovereignty belongs to the 23.5 million people of Taiwan, and only the people of Taiwan have the right to decide the future of Taiwan. The People's Republic of China has never ruled Taiwan, and Taiwan exists independently in the international community. This has been the fact and status quo across the Taiwan Strait for a long time. No matter how the Chinese government distorts its claims to Taiwan, it cannot change this fact. The people of Taiwan will only be more determined to uphold sovereignty and democracy, and will continue to work with countries that share democratic values to maintain and promote peace, stability and prosperity in the Indo-Pacific region."

On 10 October 2021, Tsai Ing-wen expressed four principles in her speech on the 110th anniversary of the Republic of China : "We must always uphold the free and democratic constitutional system; we must insist that the Republic of China and the People 's Republic of China are not subordinate to each other; we must insist that sovereignty is inviolable and cannot be annexed; and we must insist that the future of the Republic of China-Taiwan must follow the will of all the people of Taiwan." These four principles are the bottom line for the people of Taiwan.

On 2 May 2022, Yu Da-yi, the Vice Minister of the Ministry of Foreign Affairs of the Republic of China, used the term "Republic of China Taiwan" in his report to the Legislative Yuan. This was criticized by Tseng Ming-chung, a legislator from the Kuomintang, who believed that the term should not be used in official documents.

=== English translation ===
When Tsai Ing-wen's National Day speech was translated into English, the Presidential Office of the Republic of China initially wrote "Republic of China Taiwan", and the BBC initially wrote "Republic of China, Taiwan". Subsequently, both changed it to "Republic of China (Taiwan)".

=== Poll ===
19 October 2019: Percentage of Taiwanese people agreeing with the statement that "Republic of China-Taiwan" is the greatest common denominator in society.
Political affiliation	Agree	Disagree	No opinion
Democratic Progressive Party	90.2	3.2	6.6
Kuomintang	23.4	60.4	16.3
Taiwan People's Party	55.3	36.8	7.9
New Power Party	80.6	13.8	5.5
Pan-Green Coalition	82.2	5.5	12.3
Pan-Blue Coalition	32.5	40.9	26.6
Neutral	50.0	8.4	41.6

Source: Cross-Strait Policy Association

=== Reactions ===
Chen Binhua, spokesperson for the Taiwan Affairs Office, stated that the so-called "Republic of China-Taiwan" does not exist at all. The overseas edition of the People's Daily believes that the term "Republic of China, Taiwan" is the "COVID-19" of Taiwan independence, and that the introduction of this term is merely a pro-independence tactic of the Democratic Progressive Party.

The magazine WHYNOT stated that there is no substantial difference between "Republic of China Taiwan" and "Republic of China in Taiwan" or "Taiwan is a de facto independent country" in the Resolution on Taiwan's Future; Tsai Ing-wen put forward this statement only to blur the difference between "Taiwan" and "Republic of China" in the most direct way during the dissemination process and to resolve the opposition between the two. Professor Makoto Kawashima of the University of Tokyo believes that the term "Republic of China Taiwan" is a means for Tsai Ing-wen to maintain the status quo without abandoning the framework of the Republic of China.
