= Republic of China on Taiwan =

Political term

Republic of China on Taiwan (Chinese: 中華民國在臺灣; pinyin: Zhōnghuá Mínguó zài Táiwān) is a political term as well as discourse regarding the present status of the Republic of China. It was proposed in 1995 by then-president Lee Teng-hui, the first locally-born president (i.e., the first to have been born on Taiwan). During his presidential tenure, Lee visited his alma mater Cornell University and mentioned this term for the first time when delivering an Olin Lecture.

The term is one of several regarding the Republic of China, and is not exactly about Taiwanese independence. The term was later included in the Four-Stage Theory of the Republic of China as the third stage from 1988 to 2000 by President Lee's successor Chen Shui-bian. During Chen's administration, the phrase was used in an initial application for UN membership in 2000, but the term was replaced with other expressions in 2002 and 2006 applications and has not been used since.

== Background ==
Before Lee Teng-hui coined the term, the officials of the Republic of China had always used the state's official name "Republic of China". Therefore, the term was regarded as a breakthrough.

In regards to the origin of the term, Lee explained in 2005 during a lecture in Lee Teng-Hui Institute that, following World War II, Chiang Kai-shek's forces temporarily occupied the island of Taiwan under the direction of Supreme Commander for the Allied Powers Douglas MacArthur. Because both the Treaty of San Francisco and the Treaty of Taipei concluded afterwards did not explicitly specify to whom Japan renounced the sovereignty of Taiwan, the legal status of Taiwan has become undetermined, which is why he coined the term "Republic of China on Taiwan".

== See also ==
- Elections in Taiwan
- Four Noes and One Without
- Four-Stage Theory of the Republic of China
- History of Taiwan (1945–present)
- Political status of Taiwan
- Politics of the Republic of China
- President of the Republic of China
- Second Republic of China (Taiwan)
- Taiwanese nationalism
