= Four-Stage Theory of the Republic of China =

Theory about the political status of the ROC

- Traditional Chinese: 中華民國四階段論
- Simplified Chinese: 中华民国四阶段论
Transcriptions
Standard Mandarin
- Hanyu Pinyin: Zhōnghuá Mínguó Sì Jiēduàn Lùn
Southern Min
- Hokkien POJ: Tiong-hoâ Bîn-kok Sì Kai-toāⁿ Lūn

The Four-Stage Theory of the Republic of China or the Theory of the Four Stages of the Republic of China is a viewpoint proposed by Chen Shui-bian, the President of the Republic of China from 2000 to 2008, in 2005. It is a viewpoint regarding the political status of the Republic of China, whose government retreated to the island of Taiwan after the Chinese Civil War in 1949. The main idea of the theory is that the time line for the development of the Republic of China can be classified into four stages, which are:

1. The Republic of China on the mainland (中華民國在大陸; Zhōnghuá Mínguó zài Dàlù), 1912–1949
2. The Republic of China arrival to Taiwan (中華民國來臺灣; Zhōnghuá Mínguó lái Táiwān), 1949–1988, before Lee Teng-hui's presidency
3. The Republic of China on Taiwan (中華民國在臺灣; Zhōnghuá Mínguó zài Táiwān), 1988–2000, during Lee Teng-hui's presidency
4. The Republic of China is Taiwan (中華民國是臺灣; Zhōnghuá Mínguó shì Táiwān), 2000–now, during Chen Shui-bian's presidency

== Premises ==
By this theory, Chen pointed out that the Republic of China was at the 4th stage after the first ruling party rotation of the central government in 2000. That is, Taiwan, with the official name called the "Republic of China", is already an independent sovereign state separate from People's Republic of China.

== Development ==
Both the Free China Journal and the Free China Weekly often referred to the polity as the "Republic of China on Taiwan" prior to Lee Teng-hui taking office as the first Taiwan-born president of the Republic of China. During Lee's administration, the term remained in use, and he used the term in his speech at Cornell University, Ithaca, New York, United States in June 1995. It was used to identify the Republic of China with its remaining major component – the island of Taiwan, as opposed to its decades-long claim to all China since losing the civil war in 1949. Prior to this speech, the government officials used "Republic of China" when the name of the state was used. Lee's usage is considered as a departure from the convention, as this usage can be interpreted in the sense that the Republic of China's sovereignty does not extend to mainland China, which the People's Republic of China controls.

The Democratic Progressive Party's 1999 Resolution on Taiwan's Future, which is accorded equivalent status as the Party charter, serves as the baseline of debates toward the "status quo". According to the 1999 Resolution: "Taiwan is a sovereign and independent state and that its national title is the ROC." In other words, "Taiwan is the ROC".

During the Democratic Progressive Party (DPP) administration under Chen Shui-bian, he directed that all government publications and websites to use the form "Republic of China (Taiwan)." These two variations have been used under their respective administrations for the ROC/Taiwan petition to join the United Nations. Unlike the Cold War era when the KMT-controlled ROC competed with the PRC as the legitimate representative of China (including Taiwan), during Chen Shui-bian's presidency, the ROC did not seek to be the representative of China (i.e. it does not seek the PRC's seat on the Security Council or its ouster) and stresses in its petitions that it was only seeking to represent the people of the land under its effective control (i.e. UN's principle of universality).

On October 8, 2011, the eve of the centennial celebration of the founding of the Republic of China on October 10, the Democratic Progressive Party (DPP) Chairperson Tsai Ing-wen and the presidential candidate for the 2012 Taiwan presidential election explained her stance on the existence of the Republic of China on Taiwan as "...the Republic of China has lost the land on which it was originally established. It only exists in Taiwan. It has merged into the land and people of Taiwan. Today, the majority of the people in Taiwan can agree that Taiwan is the Republic of China, and the Republic of China is Taiwan.", "Taiwan is a sovereign and independent country", and "...after we began directly electing our president, the current Republic of China government is no longer a foreign government. It is now the government of Taiwan."

Historian Chen Yi-shen said "many are aware that the ROC and Taiwan are two faces of the same coin" and Tsai's ROC was an extension of the ROC from former presidents Lee Teng-hui and Chen Shui-bian. While some understood "elections have their own languages", many Taiwanese, including former DPP Chairman and former president of the Examination Yuan Yao Chia-wen, are absolutely against the ROC and insist "we need to promote the rectification of our nation's name to the Republic of Taiwan".

Tsai won the 2016 Taiwan presidential election and sworn in as first female President of the ROC on May 20.

== Controversy ==
This theory is welcomed by the mainstream of the Pan-Green coalition (led by the Democratic Progressive Party) in Taiwan, which supports eventual de jure Taiwan independence; but is not welcomed by most members of the Pan-Blue coalition (Kuomintang), which supports Chinese unification as part of a single "Chinese nation". Some members of the more strongly pro-independence Taiwan Solidarity Union also oppose this view since they deem the ROC to be an illegitimate foreign and colonial regime that should be replaced by the proposed "Republic of Taiwan". The Pan-Blue Coalition agrees with the first three stages, but disagrees with the fourth stage, and prefers to maintain the distinction between the "Republic of China" (the polity) and "Taiwan" (part of the territory the polity governs). The government of the People's Republic of China has also voiced opposition against the fourth stage on the grounds that such an interpretation is a step closer to de jure Taiwan independence. (Officially, the PRC claims the existence of the ROC only until 1949.)

== See also ==
- Chinese Taipei
- Foreign relations of Taiwan
- Free area of the Republic of China
- History of Taiwan
- History of the Republic of China
- Huadu (Taiwan)
- One Country on Each Side
- Political status of Taiwan
- Politics of the Republic of China
- Retreat of the government of Republic of China to Taiwan
- Republic of China on Taiwan
- Resolution on Taiwan's Future
- Taiwan after World War II
- Taiwan consensus
- Taiwanese nationalism (Taiwanization)
- Taiwan independence movement
- Taiwan passport
- Theory of the Undetermined Status of Taiwan
