= Taiwanese Localism Front =

Taiwanese Localism Front 島民抗中聯合
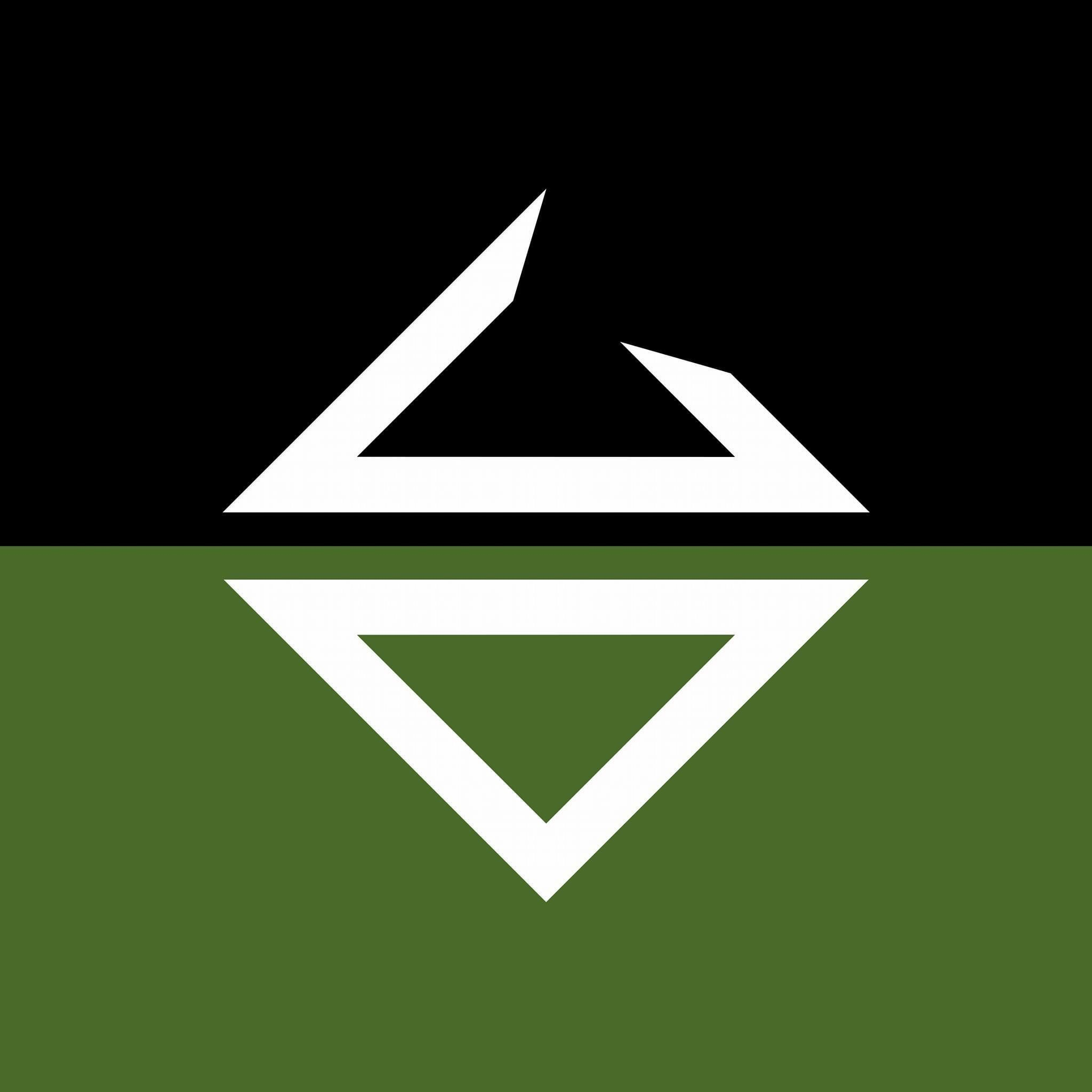
- Founded: November 2016
- Preceded by: Vanguard Party
- Headquarters: Taiwan
- Newspaper: "Eagle of the Taiwan Sea" (臺海之鷹)
- Youth wing: "Island Resistance Youth Army" (島抗聯青年軍)
- Ideology: Radical anti-communism Factions: Taiwanese independence ROC independence
- Political position: Far-right

The Taiwanese Localism Front (島民抗中聯合, lit. "Islanders' Anti-China Coalition") or simply TLF (島抗) is an anti-communist secret society formed in Taiwan in 2016 and a resistance organization against the People's Republic of China (PRC) and the Chinese Communist Party (CCP), with members from Taiwan, Hong Kong, and Inner Mongolia.

== History ==
The predecessor of the TLF is the "Vanguard Party" (先鋒黨), an informal organization formed in Taiwan in 2014. It began its official activities in November 2016 after being reorganized into "Taiwanese Localism Front". While outsiders do not know the total number of its members and the exact organizational structure, many mainland Chinese and Hong Kong media outlets estimate that there are TLF members in various parts of Taiwan and Hong Kong.

In October 2017, the TLF published an open letter written and typed by a local Mongolian resistance league member in Bayannur, Inner Mongolia, which sparked discussion in Taiwan.

In November 2021, the TLF published a cartoon on social media in support of Hong Kong's resistance activists assassinating a Hong Kong police officer, which was criticized by the pro-government Sing Tao Daily as "Incitation to Terrorism".

== Political stance ==
The TLF argued that Taiwan should prepare for a showdown with the PRC by strengthening its arms and reforming its military system, arguing that Hong Kong's complete communization would pose a threat to Taiwan's defense, and that Taiwan's self-determination should be ultimately realized only when external threats are removed, allowing Taiwan to truly decide its final course and become a normal country.

They have tried to train the militia by insisting on the use of force against the PRC, and have been criticized by Sing Tao Daily for supporting Hong Kong, Inner Mongolia, Manchurian independence, and resistance movements with mainland China several times.

== See also ==
- Anti–People's Republic of China sentiment#Taiwan
- Chinese imperialism
- Militarism
- Hong Kong nationalism
- "Peace through strength"
