= Chuang Kuo-jung =

- 莊國榮
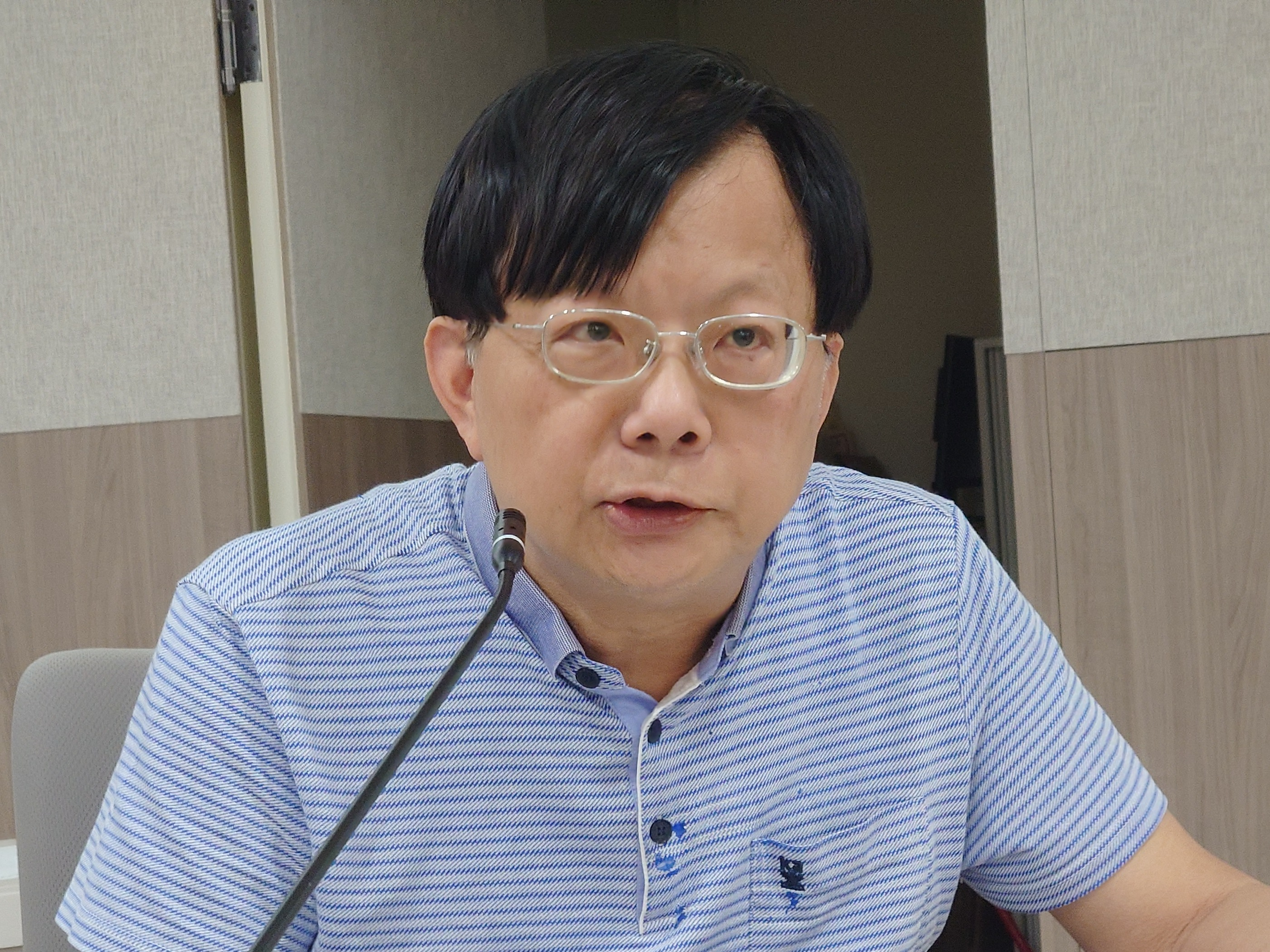
- Chuang in 2025

Secretary-General of the Ministry of Education
- President: Chen Shui-bian
- Minister: Tu Cheng-sheng
- Premier: Chang Chun-hsiung

Personal details
- Born: 1960 (age 65–66) Tainan, Taiwan
- Education: National Taiwan University (BA, MA); LMU Munich (PhD)

Chuang Kuo-jung (Chinese: 莊國榮; pinyin: Zhuāng Guóróng; Wade–Giles: Chuāng Kuó-júng; Pe̍h-ōe-jī: Chong Kok-êng; born 1960) is a former Secretary-General of the Ministry of Education in Taiwan. He served under Minister Tu Cheng-sheng.

== Early life and education ==
Chuang earned his bachelor's and master's degree from the National Taiwan University and holds a Ph.D. from LMU Munich. He joined the Kuomintang (KMT) in 1978, but grew disillusioned and subsequently leaned towards the Democratic Progressive Party, even though he is not a party member.

== Political career ==
Chuang was responsible for renaming the Chiang Kai-shek Memorial Hall to National Taiwan Democracy Memorial Hall in 2007. He directed the Ministry of Education to take down the inscription on the "Great Centrality and Perfect Uprightness" (Chinese: 大中至正) to "Liberty Square" (Chinese: 自由廣場). The process was met with controversy, as it was seen by the Kuomintang as part of the move by the ruling Democratic Progressive Party to remove every trace of Chiang from Taiwan.

== Resignation and aftermath ==
Chuang resigned from his post after experiencing fallout from the public and media when he made provocative comments at a rally in Taichung on 16 March 2008, about the KMT's then-presidential candidate Ma Ying-jeou and accusations that Ma's father Ma Ho-ling had affairs with various women. This drew the wrath of the Taiwanese public. With the 2008 presidential elections days away, Democratic Progressive Party officials, including presidential candidate Frank Hsieh and Minister Tu Cheng-sheng, publicly apologized for Chuang's remarks to limit the damage.

Chuang e-mailed an apology, and resigned from his post as secretary of the Ministry of Education under intense public pressure. Minister Tu accepted the resignation after reservations. Although KMT legislators alleged that the apology was written on behalf of Chuang, Ma accepted the apology.

== See also ==
- Taiwanese localization movement
