= Han and traitors cannot coexist =

- Traditional Chinese: 漢賊不兩立
- Simplified Chinese: 汉贼不两立
Transcriptions
Standard Mandarin
- Hanyu Pinyin: Hàn zéi bù liǎng lì

"Han and the traitors cannot coexist" was an informal expression of the Republic of China (ROC)'s foreign policy and political ideology during the Chiang Kai-shek administration, summarizing the ROC's "one China" policy at the time. It originated in 1949, after the ROC government retreated to Taiwan, when Chiang Kai-shek insisted in the international community that the Republic of China represented the only legitimate China, and that the Chinese Communist Party was a rebel organization.

== Background ==
The phrase "Han and traitors cannot coexist" comes from the Chu Shi Biao attributed to Zhuge Liang, which states, "The late emperor considered that Han and traitors could not coexist, and the royal cause could not be secured by partial peace." Here, "Han" refers to the Shu Han regime, which considered itself to be the legitimate successor to the Han dynasty, while "traitors" refers to the Cao Wei regime.

The Republic of China considered itself the legitimate successor to the Chinese throne, referring to itself as "Han"; the "illegally independent" People's Republic of China was considered "traitor." In order to restore the legitimacy of China, the ROC advocated a counterattack on the mainland.

== History ==
The 15th Olympic Games were held in Helsinki, Finland in 1952. On 17 July 1952, the 47th General Assembly of the International Olympic Committee held a meeting and for the first time raised this "China issue" for discussion. The 57 members present at the meeting passed a resolution by a vote of 33 to 20, allowing sports teams from both sides of the Taiwan Strait to participate in the Olympic Games at the same time. However, the delegation of the Republic of China withdrew from the competition on the principle of "the traitors and the Chinese cannot coexist". Since then, the issue of the two Olympic Games has been the subject of a long and fierce dispute in the international sports arena.

In 1966, NATO countries proposed a proposal to study the Committee on Dual Representation for the first time at the 21st United Nations General Assembly. Although it was supported by most of the United States’ allies, it was met with mobilization and severe criticism from the Republic of China and opposition from the allies of the People’s Republic of China. Ultimately, it failed to pass with 34 countries in favor and 62 countries against.

In 1971, the issue of the People's Republic of China replacing the Republic of China's seat of China was supported by most countries. The government of the People's Republic of China insisted on "no entry into Beijing without leaving Taipei" and "expelling Chiang Kai-shek's gang." The government of the Republic of China, on the surface, insisted on "no coexistence between the Han and the traitors." Before the opening of the United Nations General Assembly, the United States and its allies put forward a draft resolution on "dual representation". The Republic of China had agreed to accept the suggestion of the U.S. State Department. The Ministry of Foreign Affairs of the Republic of China also instructed all its embassies abroad to explain the position of the Republic of China to friendly nations:

While we urge all countries to continue supporting our membership and voting against the Albanian-led' Exclusion Act,' we understand if our allies decide to support the dual representation act simultaneously.

Before the vote, the U.S. representative attempted to change the Albanian case (A/L.630) to an "important issue" (A/L.632), raising the threshold for passage to two-thirds of the member states, and continued to push for China's dual representation policy through Richard Nixon, forcing Chiang Kai-shek to accept it, and having the Ministry of Foreign Affairs explain to friendly nations the Republic of China's understanding and support for the dual representation case. On 29 September 1971, the United States, Japan, and 19 other countries submitted a draft resolution A/L.633 on the "complex dual representation proposal". The draft resolution proposed that the United Nations accept and give a Security Council seat to the People's Republic of China, while allowing the Republic of China to continue to exist as an ordinary member state, with both Chinas having seats in the General Assembly.

On 18 October 1971, Jamil M. Baroody, the Saudi Arabian ambassador who was friendly with the Republic of China, was instructed by his king to help the Republic of China. He also proposed a new draft resolution, A/L.637, which was a "revision proposal to the Albanian draft." He spoke repeatedly and insisted that his proposal was better than the Albanian proposal or the dual representation proposal. Baroody believed that the American version of the dual representation draft was not comprehensive enough. He had already proposed an amendment, but at the last minute he proposed a new draft resolution and asked it to be given priority on the agenda. The proposal was rejected on October 25 with 56 votes against, 53 votes in favor and 19 abstentions.

On 25 October 1971, the resolution on "important issues" A/L.632 was voted on before Albania submitted it. The vote was 59 against, 54 in favor and 15 abstentions. After the "important issues" were rejected, then-US Permanent Representative to the United Nations George H.W. Bush, together with Japan and seventeen other countries (later increased to nineteen), urgently proposed a temporary motion to vote on the draft resolutions A/L.630 and Supplementary Documents 1 and 2 in sections, and to make "expelling Chiang Kai-shek’s representatives from the seats they illegally occupy in the United Nations and all its agencies" a separate resolution. However, this motion was not passed in the vote with 61 against, 51 in favor and 16 abstentions. Finally, on the same day, the United Nations adopted the draft A/L.630, jointly submitted by Albania and 23 other countries, with 76 votes in favor, 35 votes against and 17 abstentions, namely Resolution 2758.

On 26 October 1971, the Republic of China, one of the founding members of the United Nations, withdrew from the United Nations, and the government of the People's Republic of China replaced the Republic of China's seat on the Security Council as the permanent member representing "China". After the Republic of China withdrew from the United Nations, as many countries turned to establish diplomatic relations with the People’s Republic of China and severed diplomatic ties with the Republic of China, the diplomatic environment was gradually greatly restricted by the People’s Republic of China, and the slogan "Han and the traitors cannot coexist" was no longer used.
