= Cultural Taiwan independence =

Political term in China

- Traditional Chinese: 文化台獨
- Simplified Chinese: 文化台独
Transcriptions
Standard Mandarin
- Hanyu Pinyin: Wénhuà táidú

"Cultural Taiwan independence" is a political concept in the People's Republic of China (PRC), which claims that Taiwan's pro-independence faction, led by the Democratic Progressive Party (DPP), seeks to achieve complete de-Sinicization by pushing for the repeal of the minor curriculum adjustments made by the Ma Ying-jeou administration, reshaping Taiwanese identity, and re-establishing localization movements. The PRC argues this would culturally separate Taiwan from China, ultimately promoting de jure independence and establishing Taiwan as an independent nation under international law. The term has also been used by Kuomintang to criticize the DPP.

== History ==
The People's Republic of China categories the Taiwan independence movement into three categories: soft, cultural, and strategic Taiwan independence. Among them, cultural Taiwan independence is to use education as a means to instill the concept of Taiwan independence into the minds of young people in Taiwan, and to change the cultural and political identity of Taiwanese people in a subtle way. The PRC claims this will make Taiwanese people no longer turn to China, change the social structure of Taiwan, and give the Taiwan independence movement a greater political foundation. The PRC claims that ultimately, it will make Taiwan an independent country and break away from China's control. Examples include opposing curriculum adjustments, de-emphasizing of Sun Yat-sen and Chiang Kai-shek, and the passing the Act on Promoting Transitional Justice.

In 2016, after Tsai Ing-wen was elected President of the Republic of China, the Democratic Progressive Party (DPP) came to power for the second time. In her inaugural address, Tsai Ing-wen did not mention acknowledging the 1992 Consensus. The cabinet of Premier Lin Chuan revoked the revised curriculum guidelines by executive order. The PRC believes that the education reforms implemented from the Lee Teng-hui era to the Chen Shui-bian era were essentially aimed at promoting cultural Taiwan independence. After Ma Ying-jeou came to power, the PRC views that he revised textbooks to correct the wrongs and return to the direction of One China. However, the PRC views the DPP has promoted cultural Taiwan independence through the Sunflower Student Movement and the anti-high school curriculum guidelines revision movement. The Tsai Ing-wen government revoked the revised curriculum guidelines, which was seen by the PRC continuation of the de-Sinicization policy of the Chen Shui-bian era, forming a route mainly based on cultural Taiwan independence. Chiu Chui-liang, the chairman of the Mainland Affairs Council, denied that cultural Taiwan independence was being promoted.

Using the name of Taiwan to engage in international activities is regarded by the PRC as a form of cultural Taiwan independence. For example, in 2002, at the 4th Asian Poetry and Book Fair, Taiwanese participants were listed as Chinese poets, which aroused protests from Taiwan and was regarded as a form of cultural Taiwan independence.

Hung Hsiu-chu, chairwoman of Kuomintang, also criticized the Tsai government for pursuing cultural independence, which would lead to a confrontational relationship between Taiwan and mainland Chinese government. The Lin Chuan cabinet abolished the minor curriculum guidelines. Wang Xiaobo believed that this was a return to the 1998 curriculum guidelines of the Chen Shui-bian government era, moving towards the ideology of Japanese imperialism, de-Sinicization, and pursuing cultural independence. In 2016, the National Development Research Institute of Kuomintang established the Sun Yat-sen Academy to promote the modernization of the Three Principles of the People in order to counter cultural independence, promote the Chinese cultural tradition, and promote the historical perspective of the Republic of China.

== See also ==
- Cross-strait relations
- Political status of Taiwan
