= Taiwan Passport Sticker =

Taiwan Passport Sticker (Chinese: 台灣國護照貼紙) is a set of passport stickers designed by pro-Taiwan independence activist Denis Chen in 2015. Taiwanese pro-independence supporters placed the sticker on the front cover of Taiwan passports to re-brand the country's official name from "中華民國" and "Republic of China" to the fictional name "台灣國" (lit. State of Taiwan) and "Republic of Taiwan" (ROT). The country's national emblem, which is nearly identical to the emblem of Kuomintang, can also be replaced by the cartoons of images unique to Taiwan, including Jade Mountain, the island's highest mountain; a Formosan black bear; and pro-democracy activist Cheng Nan-jung.

The designer of the stickers, Denis Chen, said that his goal was "to highlight the absurdity of 'the Republic of China' and the need of founding a new country through changing the passport covers".

Pro-independence Taiwanese applauded these stickers, with some commenting on social media that they had experienced a prolonged customs process abroad, because officers confused the Republic of China with People's Republic of China.

== Controversies in other countries ==
Despite claims by internet users that the re-branded passport was accepted by 27 countries for entry (including the People's Republic of China), the sticker soon caused its holders to be deported from a number of countries and regions, while some other countries forced the holders of such passports to remove their stickers. It is worth noting that alteration of passports, including its covers, may be a criminal offense in some countries.

Singapore was the first country in Asia to deny entry to holders of such passports on 29 November 2015, and deported three ROC nationals for "altering their travel documents". Among the three, two immediately removed the ROT stickers upon the further inquiries by the Immigration and Checkpoints Authority (ICA) officers, but were eventually deported by Singapore to Taiwan. Another person had refused to remove such stickers and instead requested diplomatic representatives of Taiwan for consular protection, but was also deported in the end by ICA. The two Special Administrative Regions of China, Hong Kong and Macau, soon followed suit and refused to accept holders of such passports for entry. A spokesperson of Hong Kong Immigration Department said that any person who "altered the travel document without lawful authority, or, who possess or use altered travel document", is a violation of Immigration Ordinance and can be sentenced for up to 14 years in prison.

The American Institute in Taiwan (AIT) had, through diplomatic channels, notified the Taiwanese Ministry of Foreign Affairs (MOFA) and confirmed that holders of such passports may be extensively questioned by the U.S. Customs and Border Protection (CBP) officers and be removed from the United States, and in March 2016, two travelers from Taiwan voluntarily removed ROT stickers because of the extensive questioning by CBP officers. The two travelers were eventually admitted into the U.S., while a CBP spokesperson warned that alterations of travel documents made by any person who is not authorized by the government of a country can render it invalid and will result the holder's refusal of admission to the U.S., and placing ROT stickers on passports is deemed to have altered the travel documents. A similar incident also occurred in Japan when a holder of altered passport was subject to secondary inspection. After being told that he would be deported, the man finally removed the ROT stickers and placed them on his T-shirt. Afterwards, he was allowed into Japan.

Supporters of the stickers claimed that passports with ROT stickers were accepted in 27 countries, including the United States, the United Kingdom, Japan, Singapore, Germany, the People's Republic of China and the United Arab Emirates. In the case of Japan, the person who placed a ROT sticker on his passport claimed that he was simply trying to block the word "China" from his passport. Holders of such passports were also allowed entry into the Philippines, although a Bureau of Immigration (BI) spokesperson claimed that the passenger would normally be thoroughly inspected and called the incident "a serious matter", while also stating that the government would launch an investigation.

According to the Bureau of Consular Affairs (BOCA) of Taiwan, a total of 21 people had been denied entry by Singapore, Macau and Hong Kong since the end of 2015. Incidents were also reported in Japan and U.S. for the use of ROT stickers. The Taiwanese MOFA called upon travelers to not alter the cover of their travel documents so that they would not be denied entry.
