= De jure Taiwan independence =

- Traditional Chinese: 法理台獨
- Simplified Chinese: 法理台独
Transcriptions
Standard Mandarin
- Hanyu Pinyin: Fǎlǐ táidú

Alternative Chinese name
- Traditional Chinese: 台灣法理獨立
- Simplified Chinese: 台湾法理独立
Transcriptions
Standard Mandarin
- Hanyu Pinyin: Táiwān fǎlǐ dúlì

De jure Taiwan independence is a political term related to the Taiwan independence movement. Claims or actions that promote Taiwan's legal independence from China can be categorized into two levels: international law and domestic law. The concept contrasts with the de facto Taiwan independence. Furthermore, measures that emphasize Taiwan's subjectivity or declarations rejecting the one China principle are sometimes considered soft Taiwan independence and cultural Taiwan independence by the People's Republic of China (PRC). These concepts are more commonly used by the PRC or pro-unification figures; pro-independence groups tend to define themselves through routes such as name rectification, constitution-making, national normalization, and nation-building.

== Background ==
Following the Chinese Civil War, the People's Republic of China (PRC) and the Republic of China (ROC) gradually shaped the status quo across the Taiwan Strait. with the former ruling mainland China and the latter ruling Taiwan, Penghu, Kinmen. and Matsu. The relationship between the two is known as the cross-strait relationship. Both regimes claim sovereignty over the territories of mainland China and Taiwan, Penghu, Kinmen, and Matsu, asserting themselves as the sole legitimate government representing all of China and possessing Chinese representation internationally. However, in reality, far more countries recognize the PRC than the ROC. Furthermore, there has never been a practice of dual recognition between the two regimes internationally; no single country has ever simultaneously established diplomatic relations with both.

The People's Republic of China does not recognize the existence of the Republic of China government. Therefore, it believes that the fact that the Republic of China is a sovereign state based on the Constitution of the Republic of China itself constitutes de jure Taiwan independence. The public commentators of the People's Republic of China believe that if the Republic of China amends its Constitution and national symbols, even if the country's name is still the Republic of China, it may still constitute de jure Taiwan independence.

On the Republic of China side, Taiwan has developed a sense of subjectivity in its own historical context. Especially after democratization, the Taiwan independence movement is no longer considered taboo by the government and different factions have developed. The mainstream public opinion in Taiwan is "maintaining the status quo across the Taiwan Strait", but the Taiwan independence movement has also accumulated a certain proportion of supporters. The Democratic Progressive Party (DPP). which has a strong local Taiwanese consciousness, has become the ruling party of the Republic of China government many times. Its discourse or practice during its rule included that the two sides of the Taiwan Strait are not subordinate to each other, that the Republic of China is Taiwan, and calling ROC the Republic of China (Taiwan).

== International law ==
The legalist nation-building faction, represented by the Taiwan-Penghu International Law Legalist Nation-Building Party, believes that after World War II, the Republic of China only occupied Taiwan and Penghu and exercised rule under the authorization of the Allied Powers' General Order No. 1. They believe the Treaty of San Francisco and the Treaty of Taipei left Taiwan and Penghu in a state of uncertainty, as Japan declared that it would abandon its territorial sovereignty over Taiwan and Penghu, but did not transfer territorial sovereignty to the Republic of China. The legalist nation-building faction advocates that the residents of Taiwan and Penghu should exercise the principle of national self-determination under international law. They believe they should establish a sovereign state that is different from the Republic of China and become a subject of international law.

== Domestic law ==
According to scholars from the Chinese Academy of Social Sciences, de jure Taiwan independence is further subdivided into direct legal independence and indirect legal independence. "Direct legal independence" includes amending. freezing, or abolishing the Constitution of the Republic of China, enacting a new constitution, or amending the national title, amending the national symbols of the Republic of China (such as the national flag, national emblem, and national anthem), and holding a referendum on Taiwan independence. "Indirect legal independence" is more covert and includes amending certain articles in the constitution concerning sovereignty and territory, such as changing "the sovereignty of the Republic of China belongs to all the people" to "belongs to all residents of Taiwan", or changing "the territory of the Republic of China according to its inherent territory" to "limited to Taiwan, Penghu, Kinmen and Matsu" or "limited to Taiwan".

During the Chen Shui-bian administration. a campaign was launched for Taiwan to join the United Nations. In 2007, Wang Guangya, China's permanent representative to the United Nations, regarded this move as part of de jure Taiwan independence.

In May 2020, Democratic Progressive Party legislator Tsai Yi-yu led 29 legislators to submit a motion to the Legislative Yuan for review, proposing to amend "needs before national unification" in the preamble of the Additional Articles of the Constitution of the Republic of China to "needs for national development", and to change the word "before national unification" in Article 1 of the Act Governing Relations between the People of the Taiwan Area and the Mainland Area to "in response to national development"; and to change the word "national unification" in Articles 26-1 and 63 to "when the national jurisdiction extends only to Taiwan, Penghu, Kinmen and Matsu and their affiliated islands". Tsai Yi-yu later withdrew the two motions. In September 2020, DPP legislator Chen Ting-fei and others proposed a constitutional amendment version entitled "Towards National Normalization". They also proposed to amend the words "before national unification" in the text of the Constitution and its additional articles to "national development", and to amend the "inherent territory" of the Republic of China to "the area covered by the Constitution". At the same time, they proposed to effectively abolish provincial governments in terms of local system. However, the later version only retained the effective abolition of provinces and lowered the threshold for citizen referendum on constitutional amendments. According to the media commentary of the People's Republic of China, these constitutional amendment proposals put forward by the DPP are all regarded as related to de jure Taiwan independence. If they are adopted, the People's Republic of China will launch the Anti-Secession Law to counter them.

== See also ==
- Cross-strait relations
- Political status of Taiwan
