= Republic of Taiwan =

Proposed state in Taiwan

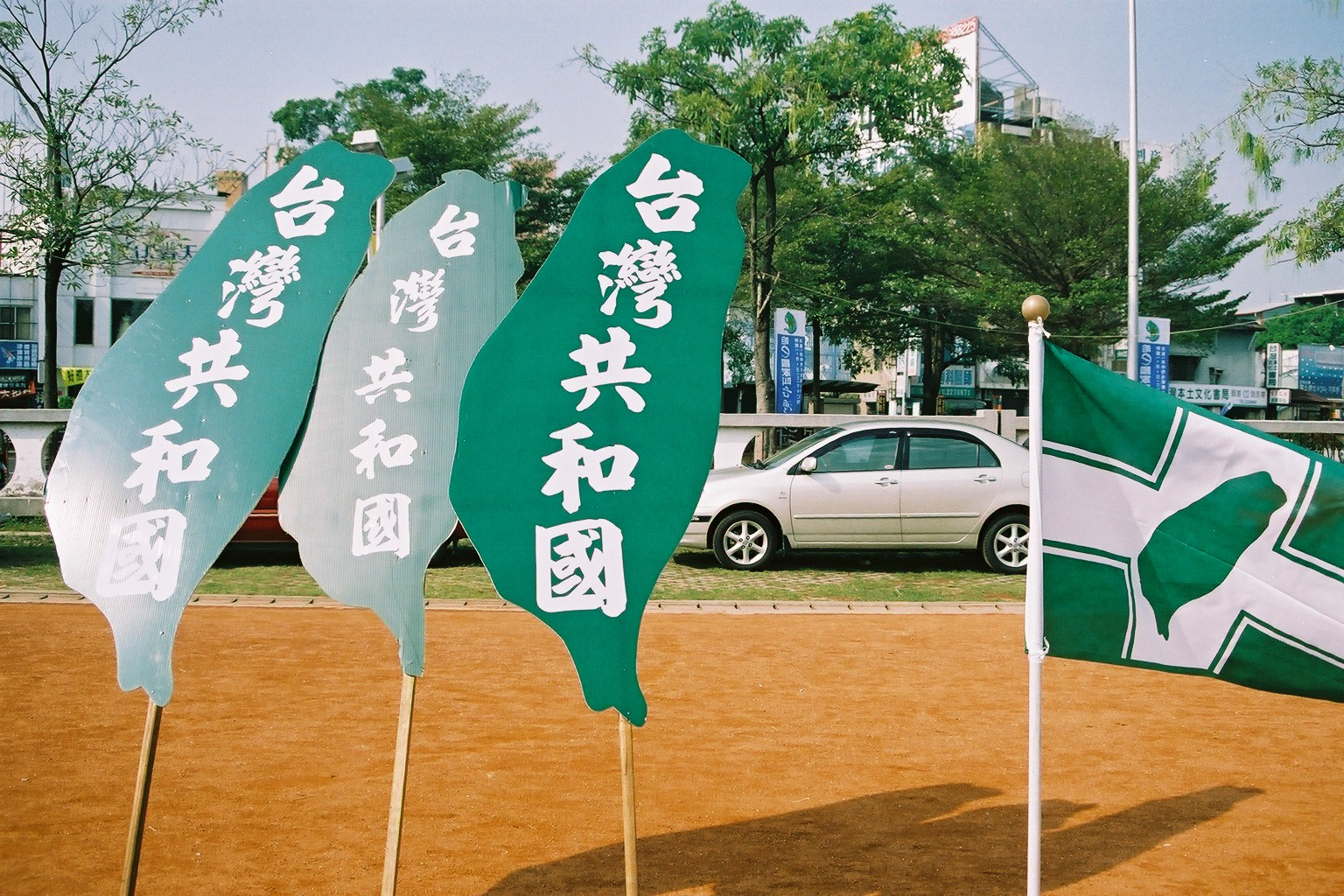
Billboard calling for the establishment of the Republic of Taiwan

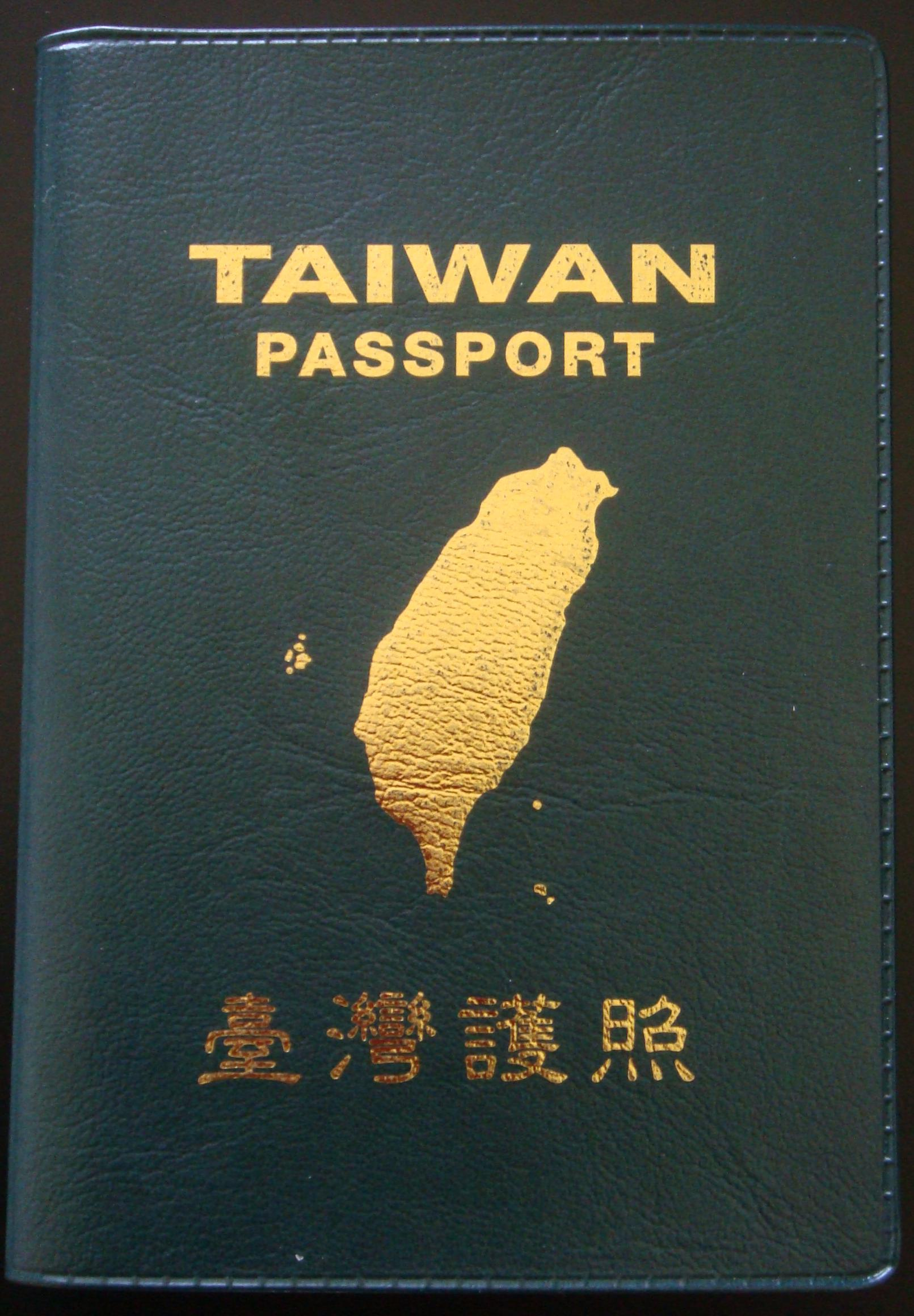
Privately produced State of Taiwan passport case

The "Republic of Taiwan" (ROT, Chinese: 台灣共和國; pinyin: Táiwān Gònghégúo; Pe̍h-oē-jī: Tâi-oân Kiōng-hô-kok) means a proposed republican state that claims independence sovereignty based on the self-determination of Taiwanese people. It is closely related to the Taiwan independence movement in a radical or narrow sense, and should be distinguished from Huadu, means Republic of China independence.

The "Republic of Taiwan" was advocated and circulated among Taiwan independence activists in the second half of the 1920s during the Taiwan under Japanese rule. After the end of the World War II, the island of Taiwan was taken over by the Republic of China (ROC), and after the impact of the February 28 incident, Taiwan independence activists centered on Taiwanese Thomas Liao founded the Republic of Taiwan Provisional Government (台灣共和國臨時政府) in 1956 in Tokyo, Japan.

== History ==
Since the period of Japanese rule, the establishment of the "Republic of Taiwan" has been one of the main demands of the Taiwanese independents. The independence movement in Taiwan can be traced back to the defeat in the First Sino-Japanese War, when the Qing dynasty ceded Taiwan and Penghu to Japan, and the people of Taiwan at that time established the "Republic of Formosa" on May 25, 1895, to resist the Japanese army.

Establishment of the Republic of Taiwan became an important demand of the Taiwanese Communist Party during the period of Japanese rule as a way to break away from Japanese rule and for national liberation. Much of the movement related to Taiwan's independence began with the Taiwanese Communist Party during the Japanese occupation. In the post-war Taiwan independence movement after the February 28th Incident, there were also those who advocated the establishment of the Republic of Taiwan, such as the Provisional Government of the Republic of Taiwan formed by Thomas Liao and others in 1956, and the World United Formosans for Independence established in 1970.

== National flag and anthem ==
No specific agreement has been reached on the flag, national anthem, and national coat of arms of the Republic of Taiwan. Since the 1980s, several of the various versions of the "Taiwan Constitution" proposed by the private sector have been referred to as "the national flag, national coat of arms, and national anthem are determined by law".

In April 1993, Cheng Er-yu created the song "Taiwan the Formosa" and submitted the lyrics to a musician living in Los Angeles, Tyzen Hsiao, who composed the lyrics and completed the score in October of the same year. The song was released in the early summer of 1994, and in order to meet the needs of various ethnic groups around the world, in addition to the Taiwanese Hokkien version, it was translated into six other languages, including Amis, Hakka, Chinese, English, and Japanese.

Flag of the World Taiwanese Congress

A proposed flag for an independent Taiwan designed by Donald Liu in 1996

In the Taiwan Name Rectification Campaign, the more commonly used name is "Republic of Taiwan". In various versions of the Taiwan Constitution, the country's name is often "Taiwan" or "Republic of Taiwan". There is also an example of Shane Lee (李憲榮) using "Democratic State of Taiwan" (台灣民主國).

Since ROT, an abbreviation for the Republic of Taiwan, means decomposition of organic matter in English, some activists have proposed different names. The proposed names include: "People's State of Taiwan" or "Peopledom of Taiwan" (台灣民國), "State of Taiwan" (台灣國), "Democratic Republic of Taiwan" (台灣民主共和國), and "Chinese Republic of Taiwan" (中華台灣共和國).

== Territory ==
Currently, the territory under the actual control of the Republic of China is the Taiwan, Penghu, Kinmen, Matsu and some minor islands, with the island of Taiwan as the main body. Among them, the Kinmen, Matsu and some minor islands are "overseas islands" that traditionally do not belong to Taiwan. (Only Taiwan and Penghu belong to the 'Taiwan Province', even under the current administrative district of the Republic of China.)

For these reasons, how the territory of "Republic of Taiwan" should be defined is controversial. While some proponents of independence argue that the ROC's effective controlling territory should be inherited, others argue that areas other than Taiwan and Penghu are not "Republic of Taiwan" territory.

== Use in foreign nations ==
In April 2002, U.S. President George W. Bush welcomed Taiwan to the World Trade Organization as “Taipei, Republic of China,” but also used the phrase "Republic of Taiwan".

On Jan. 11, 2017, Nicaragua's President Daniel Ortega invited then-Taiwan President Tsai Ing-wen to his inauguration, referring to Taiwan as the "Republic of Taiwan" (República de Taiwán) rather than the "Republic of China" (República de China). When the Honduras's government president or his officials visited Taiwan (2016) and other international events, the term "Republic of Taiwan" was often used. The Ministry of Foreign Affairs of El Salvador used the term "Republic of Taiwan" to refer to Taiwan before it broke off diplomatic relations with Taiwan on August 21, 2018.

== See also ==
- 908 Taiwan Republic Campaign
- National identity
- Taiwan Passport Sticker
- Taiwanese nationalism
