= Huadu (Taiwan) =

Political movement regarding Taiwanese identity

Republic of China independence
- Free area of the Republic of China, which Huadu supporters posit is the territory of a sovereign state separate from mainland China
- Traditional Chinese: 中華民國獨立
- Simplified Chinese: 中华民国独立
Transcriptions
Standard Mandarin
- Hanyu Pinyin: Zhōnghuá mínguó dúlì
- Bopomofo: ㄓㄨㄥ ㄏㄨㄚˊ ㄇㄧㄣˊ ㄍㄨㄛˊ ㄉㄨˊ ㄌㄧˋ
- Wade–Giles: Chung^{1}-hua^{2} Min^{2}-kuo^{2} tu^{2}-li^{4}
Hakka
- Romanization: zungˊ faˇ minˇ guedˋ tug lib
- Pha̍k-fa-sṳ: Chûng-fà Mìn-koet thu̍k-li̍p
Southern Min
- Hokkien POJ: Tiong-hôa Bîn-kok to̍k-li̍p
- Tâi-lô: Tiong-huâ Bîn-kok to̍k-li̍p

Abbreviation
- Traditional Chinese: 華獨
- Simplified Chinese: 华独
Transcriptions
Standard Mandarin
- Hanyu Pinyin: huá dú
- Bopomofo: ㄏㄨㄚˊ ㄉㄨˊ
- Wade–Giles: hua^{2} tu^{2}
Hakka
- Romanization: faˇ tug
- Pha̍k-fa-sṳ: fà thu̍k
Southern Min
- Hokkien POJ: hôa to̍k
- Tâi-lô: huâ to̍k

Republic of China independence, abbreviated in Chinese as Huadu (Chinese: 華獨; pinyin: huá dú; Wade–Giles: hua² tu²) is a stance on the status of Taiwan that posits Taiwan and its outlying islands are presently an independent state (i.e. a distinct sovereign state from the People's Republic of China) under the name "Republic of China".

== Definition ==
Huadu supporters reject the One China principle, instead positing that:

1. There is a Taiwanese state whose formal name is the Republic of China for historical reasons; and/or
2. There are de facto two Chinese states which coexist as part of a unitary nation with both having the name "China" and de jure claiming sovereignty over all of China.

Thus, because the PRC and ROC are currently simultaneously extant and politically distinct entities, Huadu can be vaguely interpreted as a perpetuation of the status quo.

The Taiwanese nationalist movement is largely divided into Huadu, which favors retaining "China" as part of the Taiwanese state's formal name to maintain legal ambiguity over the political status of Taiwan; and Taidu (Chinese: 台獨 or 臺獨; pinyin: tái dú), a syllabic abbreviation of "Taiwan independence" (Chinese: 台灣獨立 or 臺灣獨立; pinyin: táiwān dúlì) that proposes a more radical departure from the status quo by making a formal declaration of independence to create a de jure "Republic of Taiwan", favouring total separation from China. Huadu politics is generally favored by the moderate pro-independence Democratic Progressive Party (DPP) (Note: Before 1996, the DPP was closer to Taidu than Huadu.) while more radical groups such as the Taiwan Statebuilding Party and Taiwan Solidarity Union favor a declaration of independence. DPP politicians such as President Lai Ching-te hold that Taiwan is already independent as the Republic of China. DPP huadu supporters tend to see huadu politics as a pragmatic way to assert Taiwan's independence without unnecessarily aggravating the PRC government.

In addition to independence activists, some politicians in the Kuomintang (KMT) party also support Huadu. They generally oppose "one country, two systems" as well as further steps toward de jure independence. 'Light blue' former KMT Chair Johnny Chiang insisted on the abolition of the 1992 Consensus which was based on "one China".

== International Huadu sentiment ==
On 6 January 2026, Japanese House of Councillors member, Hei Seki stated in a visit to Taipei that the Republic of China was a separate, independent country from the People's Republic of China.

Countries that formally recognise the Republic of China alongside Somaliland in the contemporary era appear to have adopted pro-Huadu stances. These states formally recognise the Republic of China, alongside saying ROC in formal dialogue, but additionally emphasis these relationships as being focused on Taiwan.

== See also ==
- Anti-communism in China
  - Anti–People's Republic of China sentiment
- Four-Stage Theory of the Republic of China
- Mutual non-recognition of sovereignty and mutual non-denial of authority to govern
- Pro–Republic of China sentiment
- Second Republic of China (Taiwan)
- Status quo
- Taiwan independence movement#Support for status quo
- Taiwanese Localism Front
- Taiwanization
- Third Society Party
- Two Chinas
- Two sides of the Taiwan Strait are not subordinate to each other
