= Ilha Formosa: Requiem for Formosa's Martyrs =

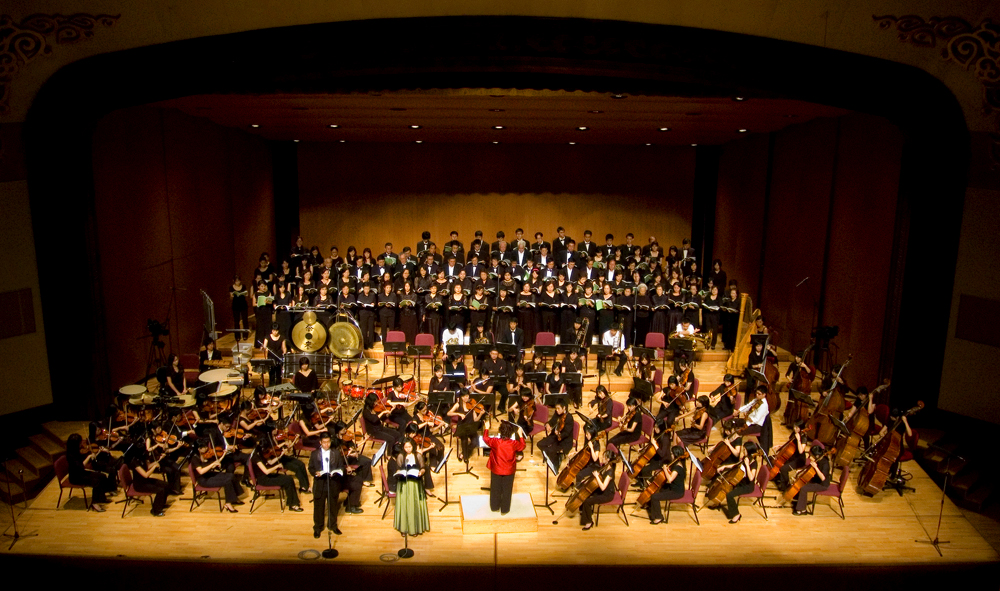
Apo Hsu conducts the NTNU Symphony Orchestra and Formosa Festival Choir in a 2007 performance of Tyzen Hsiao's Ilha Formosa Requiem

Ilha Formosa: Requiem for Formosa's Martyrs (also Ilha Formosa Requiem or Formosa Requiem) (2001) is a composition by Taiwanese composer Tyzen Hsiao for solo soprano, solo baritone, chorus and orchestra. The composition is based on a 1994 poem in Taiwanese Hokkien by Lee Min-yung.

== Description ==
Ilha Formosa ("Beautiful Island") is the name given to the island on the maps made by Portuguese mariners in the Age of Discovery, today known as Taiwan. The heart of the requiem is the second movement in which the male and female soloists in lyrical phrases remember those who suffered in the White Terror and throughout Taiwan's history. In the andante first movement, the island's most ancient voices offer their wisdom and admonish newcomers to give themselves completely to their new home. The third movement, in march tempo, encourages survivors of suffering to rise above their pain. The finale envisions an island that fulfills everything contained in the name Formosa.

== Texts ==
1. If You Ask

If you ask about the island's father,
I will tell you the sky is Taiwan's father.
If you ask about the island's mother,
I will tell you the sea is Taiwan's mother.
If you ask about the island's past,
I will tell you blood and tears have dropped onto Taiwan's feet.
If you ask about the island's future,
I will tell you to step out. The path lies open before us.

2. Memory and Perception

For every victim we chisel a name into marble.
For every victim we weave flowers into a wreath.
For every victim we pen an ode.
For every victim we sing a hymn.

3. Onward

Do not surrender to convulsions of self-pity.
Do not poison yourself with recriminations.
Lift your hands to the azure sky.
Set forth upon the shining road.

4. This Beautiful Country

This beautiful country is our everlasting love.
This beautiful country is our heart's treasure.
And this humble tapestry of dreams just sketches our hope
for this beautiful country: a green peace.

Min-yung Lee (translation: Alton Thompson)

== Performance history ==
- The world premiere of Ilha Formosa Requiem took place in Taipei in 2001. The American premiere took place later the same year in Lincoln Center, New York.
- In September 2007 the piece was featured in an American West Coast tour program by the National Taiwan Normal University (NTNU) Symphony Orchestra and Formosa Festival Choir conducted by Apo Hsu. The soloists in the second movement were Meng-Chieh Hsieh (soprano) and Yu-Hsin Chang (baritone). The Formosa Festival Choir combined the forces of the NTNU choirs, the Mangka Presbyterian Church Choir, the New Taoyuan Philharmonic Choir, and the Buddhist Candles Choir. The choirs were prepared by Tsui-Yu Huang.

== Recordings ==
- Formosa Dreaming (2007). 1 DVD. Concert given 9 September 2007 by Apo Ching-Hsin Hsu conducting the National Taiwan Normal University Symphony Orchestra and Formosa Festival Chorus. Soprano: Meng-Chieh Hsieh. Alto: Yu Lee. Tenor: Ying-Tung Hsieh. Bass: Yu-Hsin Chang. Venue: San Gabriel Civic Auditorium, Los Angeles. Repertoire by Hsiao includes Ilha Formosa: Requiem for Formosa's Martyrs and songs "The Most Beautiful Flower", "Brother Andon Goes to Market", "The Grasshopper and the Rooster", and "Eternal Home". Also features works by Fan-Long Ko. Tyzen Hsiao Music Association with National Taiwan Normal University.

== See also ==
- Taiwanese literature movement
