= Lin Yang-min =

Taiwanese author and poet

- 林央敏
- Born: 1955 (age 70–71)
- Education: Fu Jen Catholic University
- Occupations: Author, poet

Lin Yang-min (Chinese: 林央敏; pinyin: Lín Yāngmǐn; born 1955) is a Taiwanese author and poet. Lin's body of work totals over twenty published volumes of novels, short stories, poems, essays and criticism. His Rouge Tears, a poem of 110,000 words set in 9,000 lines, is the first epic poem to be written in Taiwanese. A number of his poems, including "Never Disregard Taiwan", have been set to music by Taiwanese composer Tyzen Hsiao. He is a recipient of numerous awards, including the United Daily News Prize for Literature and the Rong Hou Award for Taiwanese Poetry.

Lin, a native of Taibao in Chiayi County, studied at Chiayi Normal College and Fu Jen Catholic University. In 1983 he began writing works in Taiwanese. His interest in the creation and promotion of a distinctively Taiwanese literature accompanied a growing interest in democratic reform and Taiwanese national identity. His treatment of taboo subjects such as the White Terror under Chiang Kai-shek led to his works being officially banned by the Kuomintang government from 1987 to 1989. Today his works from the 1980s are considered landmarks in the Taiwanese literature movement.

Lin now resides in Taoyuan.

== See also ==
- Taiwan localization
- Tyzen Hsiao, composer
