= Tyzen Hsiao =

Taiwanese composer (1938–2015)

- Born: Siau Thài-jiân; January 1, 1938; Hōzan, Takao Prefecture, Japanese Taiwan
- Died: February 24, 2015 (aged 77); Los Angeles, California, United States
- Occupations: Composer, Conductor and Pianist
- Era: Neo-Romantic
- Works: See music
- Spouse: Gao Jen-Ci
- Children: 4

Chinese name
- Traditional Chinese: 蕭泰然
- Simplified Chinese: 萧泰然
Transcriptions
Standard Mandarin
- Hanyu Pinyin: Xiāo Tàirán
Southern Min
- Hokkien POJ: Siau Thài-jiân

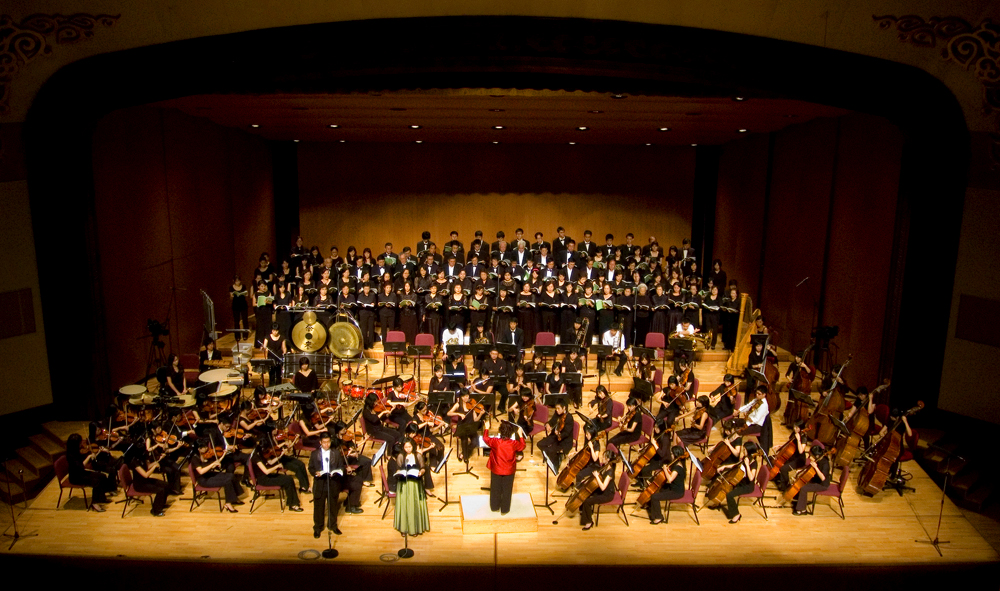
Apo Hsu conducts the NTNU Symphony Orchestra and Formosa Festival Choir in the Ilha Formosa Requiem by Tyzen Hsiao. Soloists are Meng-Chieh Hsieh and Yu-Hsin Chang. (Zhongshan Hall, Taipei, Taiwan. September 2007)

Tyzen Hsiao (Chinese: 蕭泰然; pinyin: Xiāo Tàirán; Pe̍h-ōe-jī: Siau Thài-jiân; 1 January 1938 – 24 February 2015) was a Taiwanese composer of the neo-Romantic school. Many of his vocal works set poems written in Taiwanese Hokkien, the mother tongue of the majority of the island's residents at the time. His compositions stand as a musical manifestation of the Taiwanese literature movement that revitalized the island's literary and performing arts in the 1970s and 1980s. Hsiao's career in music included additional success as a pianist and conductor.

== Music ==
Tyzen Hsiao's rich tonal style earned him an international reputation as "Taiwan's Rachmaninoff". His compositions include works for solo instruments and chamber ensembles, many works for solo voice, and large-scale pieces for orchestras and choirs with soloists.

Hsiao's most widely performed large-scale pieces include:

- Formosa Symphony, opus 49 (1987)
- Violin Concerto in D, opus 50 (1988)
- Cello Concerto in C, opus 52 (1990)
- Piano Concerto in C minor, opus 53 (1992)
- 1947 Overture for soprano, chorus and orchestra (1993)
- Ode to Yu-Shan (Jade Mountain) (1999)
- Ilha Formosa: Requiem for Formosa's Martyrs (2001)

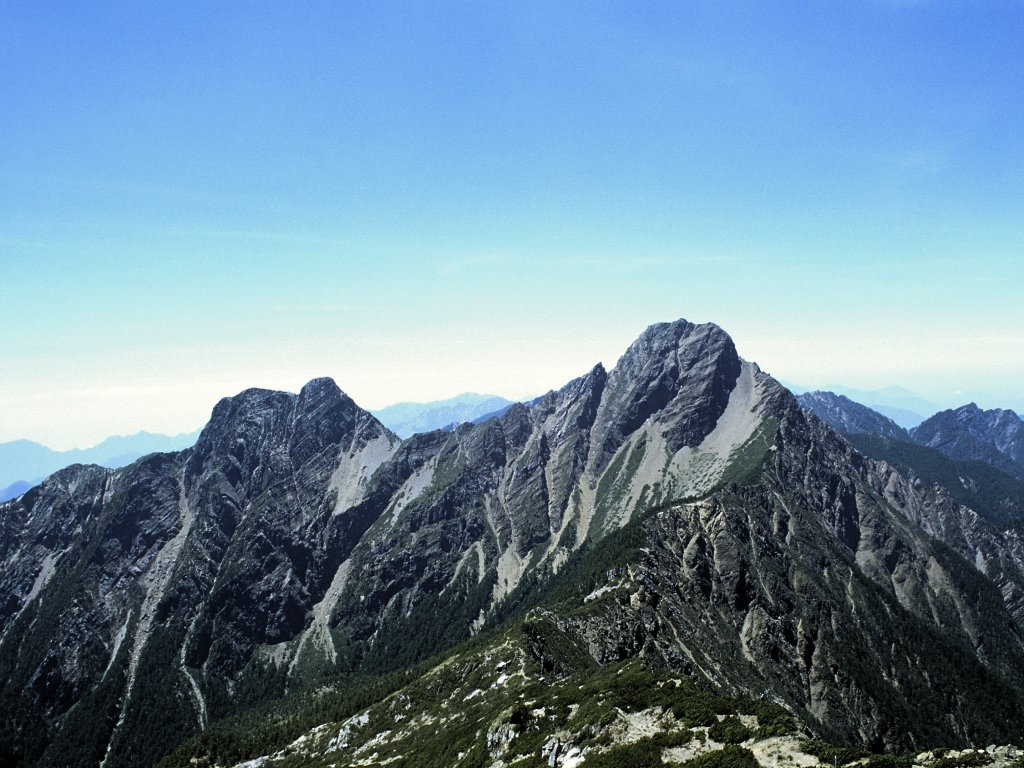
Taiwan's highest peak, the subject of Hsiao's Ode to Yu-Shan (1999)

Hsiao's art songs have become standard repertory in Taiwan. "Taiwan the Formosa" or "Taiwan the Green" has achieved status as the Taiwan's unofficial national anthem. The song appears as well in the 1947 Overture. Other well-known art songs include "The Fairest Flower", "Eternal Hometown", a Taiwanese-language setting of Psalm 23, and "I Love Taiwan." He has also won acclaim for his folk song settings, such as "Brother Andon Goes to Market" and "The Grasshopper and the Rooster." Many of Hsiao's songs also exist in orchestral song versions.

Hsiao's chamber music includes works for piano four hands, string quartets, piano quintets. The art songs formed the basis of serenades for solo violin and piano as well as other chamber combinations.

Hsiao's music for solo piano was less well known in Taiwan until performances by Lina Yeh and others began to bring this repertoire into prominence around the turn of the millennium. Works for solo piano include suites, multi-movement "poetic echoes," études, toccatas, and instrumental settings of art songs and hymns. Hsiao remarked in his comments for the recording Memories of Home: "For me it is more than a musical instrument. Introduced to me by my Japanese-educated mother, it has become my guide, my companion for life, my most beloved instrument."

Hsiao credited Rachmaninov, Bartók and Frédéric Chopin as important influences on his style, along with Presbyterian hymnody and, above all, Taiwanese folk music.

Hsiao's fusion of Taiwanese and international music traditions has influenced a number of Taiwanese composers. Enthusiasm for his music runs particularly strong at institutions where Hsiao has served in the past as a teacher, such as the National Taiwan Normal University, the Tainan University of Technology and the National Kaohsiung Normal University. Hsiao's compositions have been the subject of graduate research at the National Sun Yat-sen University in his hometown of Kaohsiung, the Florida State University in Tallahassee (USA), and other institutions.

== Life and career ==
=== Early years ===
Tyzen Hsiao was born in Hōzan Town (modern-day Fongshan District) in Taiwan's southern port city of Takao (Kaohsiung) on 1 January 1938. His father, a dentist, served as an elder in the Presbyterian church. His mother, a church pianist, began teaching him piano at an early age. As a teen at the Chang Jung Senior High School he studied with Kao Ya-mei, a singer, and Kao Chin-hua, a pianist trained in Japan. From 1959 to 1963 Hsiao majored in music at the National Taiwan Normal University (then named the Taiwan Provincial Normal Institute), taking a leave of absence midway through his studies to serve as music instructor and administrator for Pai-Sha Junior High School in Penghu. His teachers included two pianists, Kao Tzu-mei and Lee Fu-mei (李富美), and Paris-trained composer Hsu Tsang-Houei. Upon graduation Hsiao served as __ and Kaohsiung before moving to Japan in 1965 for two years of study at Musashino Academia Musicae. His teachers in Japan included Fujimoto Hideo (藤本秀夫; composition) and Nakane Nobue (中根伸也; piano).

Hsiao married Gao Jen-ci upon his return to Taiwan in 1967. Schools where he served on the faculty during this period include the Wenzao Women's Institute of Foreign Language (Wenzao Ursuline University of Languages), Kaohsiung Women's Normal College (National Kaohsiung Normal University), the Tainan Junior College of Home Economics (Tainan University of Technology) and the Tainan Theological College and Seminary. He was appointed professor at the National Taiwan Normal University in 1973. The first "Hsiao Tyzen Night" featuring performances of his music took place in 1975 at Zhongshan Hall in the Ximen District of Taipei. During this time Hsiao continued studies with Miss Isabel Taylor, a Canadian missionary, and Robert Scholz, an Austrian pianist and composer. Compositions dating from this period include the opera Jesus Christ (1971) on a libretto by his father and the Fantasy Waltz for Two Pianos, opus 38 (1973).

=== Life in America ===
In 1977 difficult personal circumstances arising from the failure of his wife's business obliged Hsiao, now the father of four children, to relocate to the United States. It was to be an eighteen-year stay.

Initially Hsiao, depressed and homesick, composed nothing. His musical activity during his first year in America, spent in Atlanta, was limited entirely to the occasional playing of piano in a gift shop for his own entertainment. One day an elderly woman in the shop took time to listen. "Young man," she said. "You are so talented. Why are you here?" Her question re-awakened the composer's creative passion.

The following year Hsiao moved to Los Angeles where he began fruitful collaborations with friends and colleagues in California's Taiwanese community. Compositions flowed from his pen. Art songs included The Vagabond (1978) on his own Taiwanese text, "March of Democracy" (1980), and "What a Beautiful Taiwan" (1984). Chamber music included the Highlander's Suite for piano quintet. Hsiao's creative activity carried political consequences, though, when the Kuomintang government, displeased with "March of Democracy," suppressed performance of Hsiao's music in Taiwan and forbade his re-entry.

From 1985 to 1987 Hsiao earned a master's in composition at the California State University, Los Angeles. His teachers included Byong Kon Kim (composition) and Milton Stern (piano). Creative activity increased in subsequent years. 1987 saw: composition of the Symphony Opus 49 "Formosa" and the art song "Never Disregard Taiwan" on a text by Yang-Min Lin; the release of a recording, Psalms of the Taiwanese: Tyzen Hsiao's Compositions by the North American Taiwanese Professors Association. In 1988 Hsiao composed the Violin Concerto in D, opus 50. Violinist Ingrid Chun (formerly Ingrid Kuo) was the first to promote this piece in concerts throughout the US with pianist Melody Kuo. 1988 was also the year Hsiao composed the anthem "Taiwan the Formosa" setting a text by Rev. Er-Yu Cheng. More compositions followed: the Cello Concerto in C, opus 52 (1990); The Prelude for Pipe Organ (1990); and the song "Mother's Hair" (1990). The Prelude for Pipe Organ won the California Music Teachers Association Composition Competition in 1991. The Taiwanese American Foundation named Hsiao a Humanity Award Laureate in 1989.

The Wild Lily student movement of 1990 marked the beginning of rapid progress toward democracy in Taiwan. In 1992 Taiwan's government lifted its ban on Hsiao's return. That same year Hsiao completed the Piano Concerto in C minor, opus 53 and the songs "The Fairest Flower" and "Eternal Homeland." Lin Cho-Liang and the San Diego Symphony Orchestra (USA) gave the premier of his Violin Concerto, while Carol Ou and the Taipei County Cultural Center Orchestra gave the Cello Concerto its premier in Taiwan. In 1993 Hsiao suffered a heart attack while composing the 1947 Overture. He recovered and completed the work. In 1994 Jonathan Tang and the Vancouver Symphony Orchestra (Canada) gave the premier of the Piano Concerto.

=== Return to Taiwan ===
Hsiao returned to Taiwan in 1995 as part of a wave of Taiwanese living abroad who moved back in response to democratic reforms. His new residence in Tamsui faced the sea and offered work space and inspiration. Compositions after this return included: Nocturne for Violin and Piano, Fantasia for Flute and Piano, and Toccata for solo piano (1995); Formosa Trio for piano trio and Dragon Boat Festival for solo piano (1996); Angel from Formosa and Ode to Yu-Shan (Jade Mountain) for choir with piano or orchestra (1999); the cantata "The Prodigal Son" (2000). This period was a time of growing recognition of his achievements as a composer at home and abroad. The American premier of the Cello Concerto took place in 1995 with a performance by Felix Fan and the San Diego Symphony. The premier of 1947 Overture took place the same year with a performance by the Oakland Youth Orchestra featuring soprano Huang Mei-Hsing and Taiwanese-American choir. 1997 saw the formation of the Tyzen Hsiao Music Association in Taiwan. The same year saw Russian premiers of Formosa Symphony (Russian Federal Symphony), The Angel of Formosa and Violin Concerto (Moscow Symphony). Ode to Yu-Shan (Jade Mountain) was performed as part of the 2000 Presidential Inauguration in Taipei. The Russian premier of the Cello Concerto and 1947 Overture took place in 2000 in a program that included the Violin Concerto. 2001 marked the premier of Ilha Formosa: Requiem for Formosa's Martyrs (poetry by Min-Yung Lee) in Taipei. The American premiere took place soon after in Lincoln Center, New York.

=== Retirement ===
In 2002 Hsiao suffered a stroke while composing the Love River Symphony. He moved back to Los Angeles to better enable his recovery and suspended most of his composition activities. The Love River Symphony remains unfinished.

Hsiao's music continues to be performed and recognized. The Japanese premiere of "Ilha Formosa!" took place in 2004. In 2007 Formosa Dreaming, a concert of works for orchestra and voices by Hsiao and Fan-Long Ko, toured the United States after a sendoff concert in Taipei's Zhongshan Hall, the historic venue that the served as the site of the first "Tyzen Hsiao Night" in 1975. The concert features the NTNU Symphony orchestra, the Formosa Festival Choir, and four vocal soloists from Taiwan conducted by Apo Hsu.

Hsiao was awarded Taiwan's National Art Prize (2004), the Wu Sam-lien Musical Contribution Award (2005), the Kaohsiung City Prize for the Arts (2006) and the National Cultural Award (2009).

=== Death ===
Hsiao died of lung cancer in Los Angeles, California on 24 February 2015 at the age of 77.

== Recordings ==
=== Audio ===
- The Voices of Taiwan 05 – Tyzen Hsiao (2011), a double-disc recorded by the National Symphony Orchestra of Taiwan under their own label of "Taiwan Philharmonic".
- Memories of Home: Tyzen Hsiao Piano Solo Works (2009), a two-disc set featuring pianist Lina Yeh. Recorded in 2007 and 2008. Includes Poetic Echoes opus 37, 38, and 40; "Memories of Home" suite, opus 49; single-movement works. Muse Art and Culture Management.
- Tzen Hsiao Choral Music: Love and Hope 蕭泰然: 愛與希望-蕭泰然合唱作品集. (2001) 1 CD. Conductor: Su Ching-Juin. Soprano: Fu Shang-Jen. Pianist: Tsai Yi-Shan. Formosa Singers (蘇慶俊指揮 / 傅上珍女高音 / 蔡昱姍鋼琴 / 福爾摩沙合唱團). Includes "Ode to Yu-Shan", "Taiwan the Green/Taiwan the Formosa" and sacred choral works. Tyzen Hsiao Music Association.
- Tyzen Hsiao Orchestral Music (2003), a two-disc set by Vakhtang Jordania and Russian Federal Orchestra with Moscow State Chorus. Includes Formosa Symphony, Violin Concerto (Alexander Trostiansky, soloist), Cello Concerto (Kiril Rodin, soloist), Piano Concerto (Anatoly Sheludyakov, soloist), tone poem Angel from Formosa, and 1947 Overture. Angelok 9912/13
- Tyzen Hsiao Chamber Music (2004). 1 CD. Includes piano trio "The Formosa" and string quartet "Homeland st Dusk" with art songs and works for solo violin. Soprano: Chiong-Jong Lu. 1 Violin and Soloist: Shien-Ta Su. 2 Violin: Yu-Yuan Chen. Viola: Chan-Hang Ho. Cello: Su-Chu Tseng. Piano: Lina Yeh, Tyzen Hsiao. Tyzen Hsiao Music Association.
- Taiwan Affection, Tyzen Heart: Tyzen Hsiao Works for Solo Violin and Piano (1999). 1 CD. Violin: Shien-Ta Su. Piano: Lina Yeh. Winner of Best Composer and Album of the Year prizes at the Taiwanese Golden Song Awards. Tyzen Hsiao Music Association.
- Eternal Homeland: Tyzen Hsiao Choral Works (1999). 1 CD. Tyzen Hsiao Music Association.
- Tyzen Hsiao Works for Solo Voice and Piano (1998), a two-disc set featuring soprano Li-Chan Chen and pianist Tyzen Hsiao. Tyzen Hsiao Music Association.
- Tyzen Hsiao Choral Music (1995), a two-disc compilation. Tyzen Hsiao Music Association.
- Psalms of the Taiwanese: Tyzen Hsiao's Compositions (1987). North American Taiwanese Professors Association.
- "The Voices of Taiwan 05: HSIAO, Tyzen: Three Concertos" (2-CD set): Violin Concerto / Piano Concerto / Cello Concerto (Hsiung, Lana 熊士蘭, cello • Ling, Jahja, Conductor • Chien, Wen-Pin, Conductor • Ensemble • Taiwan Philharmonic, NSO • Chang, Chiao-Ying, piano • Lin, Joseph, violin)

=== Video ===
- Formosa Dreaming (2007). 1 DVD. Concert given 9 September 2007 by Apo Ching-Hsin Hsu conducting the National Taiwan Normal University Symphony Orchestra and Formosa Festival Chorus. Soprano: Meng-Chieh Hsieh. Alto: Yu Lee. Tenor: Ying-Tung Hsieh. Bass: Yu-Hsin Chang. Venue: San Gabriel Civic Auditorium, Los Angeles, California. Repertoire by Hsiao includes the Ilha Formosa Requiem and songs "The Most Beautiful Flower", "Brother Andon Goes to Market", "The Grasshopper and the Rooster", and "Eternal Home". Also features works by Fan-Long Ko. Tyzen Hsiao Music Association with National Taiwan Normal University.
- "Taiwan the Formosa" / "Taiwan the Green" (台灣翠青) on YouTube, Kaohsiung Chamber Choir (蕭泰然)
- Interview Feature: "The Peace of Professor Tyzen Hsiao" (蕭泰然教授 平安) on YouTube

== See also ==
- Composition: "Taiwan the Formosa"
- Composition: Ilha Formosa: Requiem for the Formosan Martyrs
- Taiwanese literature movement
- Taiwanization
- Presbyterian Church in Taiwan
