= Taiwanese literature movement =

The Taiwanese literature movement (also Taiwan literature movement, Nativist literature movement) refers to the effort of authors, poets, dramatists, musicians, and publishers in Taiwan to establish recognition of a distinctly Taiwanese body of literature. The movement was the subject of considerable international as well as domestic debate in the 1970s and 1980s. Scholars have noted the difficulty in defining Taiwanese literature given the country's history and political relationships with Japan and China.

Authors saw that much of the history and tradition of the island was being ignored or suppressed in government-sponsored education. In their work they sought to carry forward this distinct Taiwanese cultural identity that existed apart from the colonizing efforts of China and Japan. Just as their predecessors in the 1920s had incurred official sanction from the Imperial Japanese government then ruling the island, authors in this new movement worked against the bans imposed by the authoritarian Kuomintang regime and were targeted for criticism by the Communist government in China. The movement is closely associated with the emergence of Taiwan's democracy in the 1990s. Figures associated with the Taiwanese literature movement include:

- Lee Min-yung
- Tseng Kuei-hai (曾貴海)
- Lin Yang-min
- Wu Ying-tao (吳瀛濤)
- Lin Chi-yang (林淇瀁; pen name: Xiang Yang 向陽)
- Tyzen Hsiao (composer)
- Li Kuei-hsien

== Taiwanese languages ==
Authors sought to gain acceptance for the Taiwanese Hokkien language along with other languages encountered on the island (aboriginal languages and Hakka). These, the mother tongues of the majority of the island's natives, became in their hands the vehicles for serious literature, including essays, plays, and epic poetry. They made the island itself the center of their perspective on history and looked to local traditions and lore as fuel for creative ideas.

An example may be seen in the 1994 poem "If You Would Ask" by Lee Min-yung. The poem adopts the point of view of a Taiwan aborigine speaking to all the island's newer residents.

If you ask
Who is the father of the island of Taiwan
I will tell you
The sky is the father of the island of Taiwan
If you ask
Who is the mother of the island of Taiwan
I will tell you
The ocean is the mother of the island of Taiwan
If you ask
What is the past of the island of Taiwan
I will tell you
Blood and tears drop on the feet of the history of Taiwan
If you ask
What is the present of the island of Taiwan
I will tell you
Corruption in power is eroding the Taiwanese soul
If you ask
What is the future of the island of Taiwan
I will tell you
Step out on your feet, the road is open to you.

(Translation: Joyce Hwang)

Native sources and unacknowledged island history were not the only influences. Authors drew inspiration from a number of literary figures abroad: Poland's Zbigniew Herbert and Czesław Miłosz; Czech poets Jaroslav Seifert, Antonín Bartušek and Miroslav Holub; Russia's Joseph Brodsky; France's André Gide and Paul Valéry; Turkey's Nazim Hikmet, Japan's Tamura Ryuichi.

The Taiwanese literature movement inspired a flowering of books, songs, and theater pieces using Taiwanese, Hakka and Taiwan aboriginal forms of expression that continues today. Taiwan's universities today offer recognize the languages and works championed by the movement as major fields of study.

== See also ==
- Taiwan nativist literature
- Taiwanese Hokkien
- Written Hokkien
- Taiwanization
- Sinicization
- Desinicization
- Taiwanese people
- Speak Hokkien Campaign
- Universal Declaration of Linguistic Rights
- "Taiwan the Formosa"
- Ilha Formosa Requiem

== Other References ==
- Gao, Pat (2003-06-01). "Toward a National Literature". Taiwan Review.
- Chung, Oscar (2003-06-01). "Literary Dialogue with the World". Taiwan Review. 10: 1–6. doi:10.1023/A:1023994403763. S2CID 92382655.
