= Husluman Vava =

Taiwanese writer

Husluman Vava (January 30, 1958 – December 29, 2007), also known by his Chinese name Wang Hsin-min (王新民), was a Takbanuaz Bunun indigenous writer. Born in Kuangyuan Village, Haituan Township, Taitung County, Husluman graduated from the Department of Mathematics and Science Education at National Pingtung University of Education. He taught at Tao Yuan Elementary School in Kaohsiung County for over 20 years and dedicated himself to field studies and literary creations, preserving and promoting Bunun culture. His works received numerous awards. In 2007, he became the first indigenous writer to be awarded the Taiwan Literature Award for Books in the novel category. He died suddenly at the end of that year from a heart attack.

== Style ==
In his early works, Husluman Vava primarily focused on Bunun oral myths and rituals, incorporating elements from life ceremonies. As his career progressed, he gradually integrated and applied Bunun culture and daily life themes. In his novel The Soul of Jade Mountain (玉山魂), he vividly portrayed the life, hunting, farming, and spiritual beliefs of the Bunun people through well-arranged characters. His works also introduced the kinship relationships among different Bunun communities, emphasizing values such as hard work, courage, and sharing.

Poet Li Kuei-hsien remarked that "Husluman Vava's representative work, The Soul of Jade Mountain, is Taiwan's first literary work which incorporates abundant Indigenous language elements. It fully presents the Indigenous way of life, particularly in its depiction of nature and all living things, imbued with poetic textures and vocabulary."
