= Apo Hsu =

Taiwanese musician

- 許瀞心
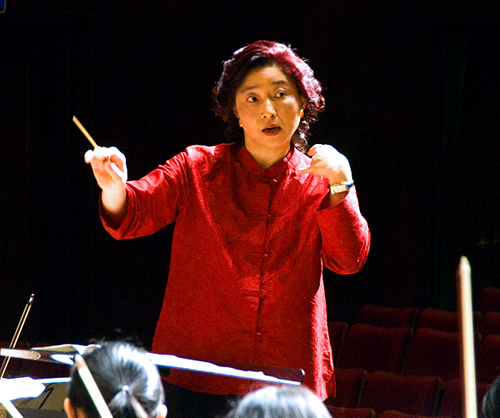
- Born: Hsu Ching-hsin; Taiwan
- Citizenship: Taiwan; United States
- Education: National Taiwan Normal University (BA); Hartt School of Music (MMus)
- Occupation: Conductor

Chinese name
- Traditional Chinese: 許瀞心
- Simplified Chinese: 许瀞心
Transcriptions
Standard Mandarin
- Hanyu Pinyin: Xǔ Jìngxīn

Apo Hsu or Hsu Ching-hsin (Chinese: 許瀞心; pinyin: Xǔ Jìngxīn) is a Taiwanese-American conductor. Hsu served as music director of the National Taiwan Normal University Symphony Orchestra and the Springfield Symphony Orchestra in Springfield, Missouri. Her past appointments include serving as artistic director of The Women's Philharmonic in San Francisco, California, and conductor of the Oregon Mozart Players in Eugene, Oregon. She has been a mentor for many young conductors on both sides of the world through her work at NTNU and at The Conductor's Institute at Bard College in New York. Her performances have been featured in national broadcasts in the United States (on National Public Radio), Taiwan (on International Community Radio Taipei), and Korea (on Korean Broadcasting System).

== Education ==
Apo Hsu received her Bachelor of Arts in music from National Taiwan Normal University. Her graduate studies in the US began at the Hartt School of Music in Connecticut where she studied double bass performance with Gary Karr. She earned an MM in double bass performance as well as an Artist Diploma in Conducting with conductor Charles Bruck. She attended the Pierre Monteux Domaine School in Maine for Advanced Conductors, The Conductor's Institute in South Carolina with Harold Farberman, and the Aspen Music Festival in Colorado with Murry Sidlin.

== Concerts ==
Apo Hsu's international career encompasses a wide array of guest appearances, residencies, and tour performances. In the United States she has appeared as a guest conductor with the San Francisco Symphony, the Barra Mansa Symphony, the National Symphony Orchestra (Washington DC), the Minnesota Orchestra, the Saint Louis Symphony Orchestra, the Detroit Symphony Orchestra, the Oregon Symphony Orchestra, the Harrisburg Symphony Orchestra, the Hartford Symphony Orchestra, the Kalamazoo Symphony Orchestra, the Wheeling Symphony Orchestra, the Interlochen Center for the Arts and many others. Hsu toured Brazil with the Women's Philharmonic in an Avon Women in Concert initiative highlighting the works of Brazilian poet Vinícius de Moraes. She has conducted in Irkutsk, Russia, as a featured conductor. She has appeared on Asia-Pacific stages as guest conductor with Korea's Sung Nam Philharmonic Orchestra, Prime Philharmonic Orchestra, and KBS Symphony Orchestra (Korean Broadcasting System), and in tour performances with the NTNU Symphony in the Australian cities of Brisbane, Sydney and Canberra. She appears regularly on concert stages in her native Taiwan, including recent guest appearances with the Kaohsiung City Symphony Orchestra and National Taiwan Symphony Orchestra and special appearances with the Festival Orchestra for the 2003 Summer Presidential Concert (Zhongli) and the Presidential Holiday Concerts (Tainan).

== Programs and recordings ==
Apo Hsu has earned acclaim for her flair with both Asian and European musical idioms. She and The Women's Philharmonic received four consecutive Awards for Adventurous Programming from the American Society of Composers, Authors and Publishers (ASCAP) and the American Symphony Orchestra League. With this group Ms Hsu recorded symphonic music by African-American composer Florence Price for the Koch International Classics label in 2001. Performances with the KBS Symphony Orchestra of Korea were featured on NPR's "Performance Today" in August 2007. A recording of the repertoire of her acclaimed 2007 Formosa Dreaming American tour program with NTNU performing artists, featuring the music of Tyzen Hsiao and Fan-Long Ko, was released in 2008. She is also closely associated with the music of Taiwanese composers Wen-Pin Hope Lee and Chao Ching-Wen.

== Teaching ==
As head of the conducting studio at NTNU Apo Hsu plays a leading role in the training of Taiwan's next generation of conductors. In North America she appears regularly as a faculty member at The Conductor's Institute at Bard College. She has served on the faculty for the American Symphony Orchestra League Conducting Workshops, National Youth Orchestra Festival 2000, the Oklahoma Summer Arts Institute 2002 and 2004, and the 2007 All State Orchestra in New Mexico. She has served as a Music Review Panelist for the National Endowment for the Arts for Meet the Composer in New York City.

== See also ==
- National Taiwan Normal University
- National Theater and Concert Hall (Taiwan)
- The Women's Philharmonic
- Florence Price, composer
- Tyzen Hsiao, composer
- Fan-Long Ko, composer
- Wen-Pin Hope Lee, composer
