= Proposed flags of Taiwan =

Replacement proposals to the Republic of China flag

Several proposals for a flag of Taiwan have been initiated by supporters of the Taiwan independence movement to replace the flag of the Republic of China as the national flag flown over Taiwan. Supporters of the movement object to the use of the flag of the Republic of China since it was designed by and is closely associated with the Kuomintang. However, no single flag has been established as the symbol of the independence movement, and supporters of Taiwanese independence, such as the Democratic Progressive Party, have accepted the flag of the Republic of China for the time being and have not pushed for a new flag. The flag of the Republic of China in current use is defined in the 6th article of the Constitution, and amending the Constitution requires a referendum which would only succeed with wide political support. The Republic of China, originally based in mainland China, retreated to Taiwan in 1949 and established its capital in Taipei. The region, now commonly referred to as "Taiwan" in vernacular, retains its official name "Republic of China" and still officially claims territories governed by the People's Republic of China, just as the PRC claims all ROC territories.

== Prominent proposals ==
From the mid-1950s to the 1970s, a self-proclaimed Republic of Taiwan Provisional Government was active in Japan. Its president was Thomas Liao, who was in exile there. This government used a flag of a blue field charged with a white sun and a white crescent moon.

In 1994, a campaign called “New Name, New Flag, New Anthem” was launched to rename the Republic of China, replace the flag of the Republic of China and the National Anthem of the Republic of China, all of which were officially used in Taiwan since 1945. After a contest in which 187 different flags were entered, the “hearts-in-harmony flag” emerged as the winner. The green field was to symbolize the natural beauty of the island and the need to protect the environment; the white in the Canadian pale was to symbolize the purity of the people on the island and the desire to preserve the natural beauty; and the device in the centre was to symbolize four hearts in harmony, representing the four population groups on the island: the indigenous peoples, Hakka, Hoklo, and mainlanders. This flag has emerged as the most well-known proposed flag of Taiwan, though it has not gained acceptance with the mainstream Democratic Progressive Party. Some Chinese nationalists criticized the design as being reminiscent of the Imperial Seal of Japan where a chrysanthemum is present. By extension, the design can be seen as an endorsement of historical Japanese colonial influence on Formosa/Taiwan.

In September 2013, the 908 Taiwan Republic Campaign held a ceremony in front of the Presidential Office Building in Taipei, raising a flag for Taiwan that had been proposed by the World Taiwanese Congress. This flag has a green field and a green map of Taiwan with its associated islands (excluding Kinmen and Matsu) in a Canadian pale.

Earlier in 2005, the same 908 Campaign had raised instead its own banner at the same place, in front of a crowd of about 500 (mostly Taiwan Solidarity Union supporters) on 8 September 2005 – a date it proclaimed "Taiwan's Independence Day" to mark the anniversary of the signing of the Treaty of San Francisco in 1952 in which Japan relinquished its claim to Taiwan. This banner, which had been featured in smaller rallies elsewhere in Taiwan, featured three horizontal stripes in blue, white, and green transitioning in color gradients and a red circle in the middle along with the characters "State of Taiwan" (台灣國). The banner was meant to symbolize history of Taiwan: the red circle to represent Japan, the blue to represent the KMT, and green to represent the DPP. Some interpretations suggest that the sun symbolizes a common asset of all humanity, allowing for various interpretations while remaining a unifying symbol. The blue ocean and green land represent Taiwan’s geographical characteristics, and the overall slogan is: 'Blue Ocean, Green Land, Taiwan Red.' It was unique, as other flag proposals avoid the color blue altogether.

In 2016, Taiwan independence proponent Chen Chih-hao designed the Flag of Taiwan the Formosa (“台灣翠青” or “Taiwan the Green” in Chinese language, inspired by the poem and hymn of the same name), which has since been adopted by supporters of the Taiwan independence movement as a symbol of Taiwan independence ideology and Taiwanese identity. Despite its colonial roots, Chen admitted his fondness of the Seal of the Government-General of Taiwan, for its meaning (the “Tai” in “Taiwan” in both Chinese and Japanese writing) and its geometrical resemblance of the impression of an island (two triangles in mirror images), and therefore introduced the seal into the flag's design. The flag adopts an aspect ratio of 1:1.5. The stacked green triangle and white triangle represent the layers of mountain ranges as the island would be viewed from ships sailing on nearby seas, with tree-clad mountains in the foreground and snow-covered mountains in the background. Switching to bird's-eye view, one could see Taiwan (as symbolized by the seal) advancing forward in the ocean and stirring up white waves, indicating Taiwanese people's determination to pursue its independence. On selecting the flag colors, deep blue in the background represents the ocean; white represents waves of immigrants with diversified cultural backgrounds at different periods throughout the history of Taiwan, migrating and assimilating into the Taiwanese society; and the bright green (Pantone 3255C) represents the first dwellers of the island – the Taiwanese indigenous peoples.

== Prospects ==
While there have been some debates about replacing the ROC flag, the likelihood of doing so is not high given that it requires a constitutional amendment, which needs wide bipartisan support and a referendum under the conditions of the article 12 of the Additional Articles of the Constitution of the Republic of China:

Amendment of the Constitution shall be initiated upon the proposal of one-fourth of the total members of the Legislative Yuan, passed by at least three-fourths of the members present at a meeting attended by at least three-fourths of the total members of the Legislative Yuan, and sanctioned by electors in the free area of the Republic of China at a referendum held upon expiration of a six-month period of public announcement of the proposal, wherein the number of valid votes in favor exceeds one-half of the total number of electors. The provisions of Article 174 of the Constitution [the previous method of amendment, via the National Assembly of the Republic of China] shall not apply.

The present flag has a huge amount of support among Pan-Blue Coalition supporters as the symbol of a Chinese democracy and even acquiescence by some independence supporters for various other reasons. On the other hand, some supporters of Taiwan Independence seek the flag change as part of a larger change to replace the Constitution of Republic of China that has been effective in Taiwan since 1945.

While green has emerged as the color of Taiwan independence and can be seen ubiquitously in pro-independence rallies, at the moment, no one flag has achieved consensus among the various groups. Unlike other political movements, those in Taiwan do not feel there is a historical or local flag suitable for use as a symbol. The flag of the short-lived Republic of Formosa is considered to be unsuitable by some, since that republic was declared by Chinese loyalists and designed as a tributary state in a failed attempt to avert Japanese colonization in 1895. The present national flag, the flag of the Republic of China, is seen by others as a symbol of Chinese nationalism.

At rallies of the Pan-Green Coalition, green campaign banners and party flags are common while the national flag is rarely displayed, but the various proposed flags are never seen in unison. A dilemma arose when Lee Teng-hui was scheduled to speak at the National Press Club in Washington, DC in 2005: while National Press Club conventions would have called the ROC flag to be flown to reflect the nationality of the speaker, pro-independence groups objected to using the flag of the Republic of China. However, the National Press Club's only other alternative, a Democratic Progressive Party flag, would have been inappropriate anyway as Lee was not a DPP member.

== In popular culture ==
The hearts-in-harmony flag in the newspaper The Guardian in 2009.

The hearts-in-harmony flag was a prominent part of the plot in the episode "A Change Is Gonna Come" of the TV series The West Wing.

The hearts-in-harmony flag was used to illustrate the entry for Taiwan in a World Factfile supplement of the British newspaper The Guardian on 25 April 2009. The entry did not use the name "Republic of China".

In the Taiwanese TV series Island Nation 2, there is a scene based on the real event when former WUFI chair Strong Chuang, wearing a T-shirt decorated with the hearts-in-harmony flag, challenged President Lee Teng-hui during his lecture at Cornell University in 1995.

== Gallery ==
Proposed flags of Taiwan
Republic of Taiwan Provisional Government flag.

World United Formosans for Independence flag.

A proposal for a flag of the Republic of Taiwan, “hearts-in-harmony” (同心旗), designed by the Reverend Donald Liu (劉瑞義) in the mid-1990s, perhaps one of the more prominent designs.

Flag of Taiwan made by the World Taiwanese Congress; it is also very commonly used by Taiwan independence supporters.

A banner of the Republic of Taiwan by the 908 Taiwan Republic Campaign.

== See also ==
- Chinese Taipei Olympic flag
- Flag of the Republic of China
- Taiwan the Formosa, a proposed national anthem for Taiwan
