= Taiwan the Formosa =

Proposed national anthem for Taiwan

台灣翠青
English: Taiwan the Formosa
- Lyrics: Ti'n Jyi-giokk, 1993
- Music: Tyzen Hsiao, 1994

"Taiwan the Formosa" (Chinese: 台灣翠青, pe̍h-ōe-jī: Tâi-oân Chhùi-chhiⁿ), also "Taiwan the Green", is a poem written (conceived in 1977; finalized in 1993) by Taiwanese poet and clergyman Ti'n Jyi-giokk (Chinese: 鄭兒玉; pe̍h-ōe-jī: Tīⁿ Jî-gio̍k; Cheng Er-yu) set to music between 1988 and 1993 by neo-Romantic Taiwanese composer Tyzen Hsiao (Chinese: 蕭泰然). An English metrical translation was provided by Boris and Clare Anderson. The text represents an early example of the popular verse that emerged from the Taiwanese literature movement in the 1970s and 1980s. In 1994, Hsiao used this hymn to conclude his 1947 Overture for soprano, choir and orchestra.

"Taiwan the Formosa" has been popular with pro-democracy activists and has been adopted by the Taiwan independence movement as a proposed national anthem for a future Republic of Taiwan. The first stanza is secular. The second, written by popular demand and published in number 2364 of Taiwan Church News in 1997, has overt Christian references in keeping with the poet's vocation as a minister in the Presbyterian Church in Taiwan. The second verse is intended only for performance in church settings or on similarly appropriate occasions.

== Lyrics ==
The poem was originally written in pe̍h-ōe-jī. It has subsequently been translated into other languages, such as Hakka (by clergyman Hiû San-hiùng [邱善雄]).

Original in Taigi (pe̍h-ōe-jī)

Thài-pêng-iûⁿ se-lâm hái-piⁿ, bí-lē-tó Tâi-oân chhùi-chhiⁿ.
Chá-chêng hō͘ gōa-pang thóng-tī, kiàn-kok taⁿ teh chhut-thâu-thiⁿ.
Kiōng-hô-kok hiàn-hoat ê ki-chhó͘, sù cho̍k-kûn pêng-téng saⁿ hia̍p-chō͘.
Jîn-lūi bûn-hòa, sè-kài hô-pêng, kok-bîn hiòng-chêng kòng-hiàn châi-lêng.

Choè goân-thaû Siōng-tè chhòng-chō, bí-lē-tó Tâi-oân choè-hó.
Siúⁿ-sù hō͘ chó͘-sian khiā-khí, kiàn-kok taⁿ Siōng-chú liap-lí.
Chú Ki-tok kok-ka ê kun-ông, lí-sióng-pang bo̍k-phiau ê kià-bōng.
Lán beh kiàn-siat jîn-ài kong-gī, chó͘-kok moá-toē chhin-chhiūⁿ tī thiⁿ. (A-men.)

Chinese characters

太平洋西南海邊，美麗島台灣翠青。
早前受外邦統治，建國今在出頭天。
共和國憲法的基礎，四族群平等相協助。
人類文化、世界和平。國民向前、貢獻才能。
最源頭上帝創造，美麗島台灣最好。
賞賜乎祖先徛起，建國今是上主攝理。
主基督國家的君王，理想邦目標的寄望。
咱欲建設仁愛公義，祖國滿地親像天頂。

English translation

By Pacific’s western shore, beauteous isle, our green Taiwan.
Once suffered under alien rule, free at last to be its own.
Here’s the basis of our nation: four diverse groups in unity,
come to offer all their varied skills, for the good of all and a world at peace.

In the beginning, God created the beautiful island of Taiwan, our favourite.
God gave it to our ancestors to inhabit and still looks over our nation.
Christ being the Lord of our nation, the ideal state is our hope and aim.
We will work towards love and justice, so that our motherland will become as heaven on earth. (Amen.)

The ethnic groups implied in the lyrics "four diverse groups" (Chinese: 四族群; lit. 'four ethnicity') are the Hoklo people, Hakka people, Taiwanese indigenous peoples, and Waishengren.

== See also ==
- National Anthem of the Republic of China
- Proposed flags of Taiwan
