= Li Kuei-hsien =

Taiwanese poet (1937–2025)

Li Kuei-hsien 李魁賢
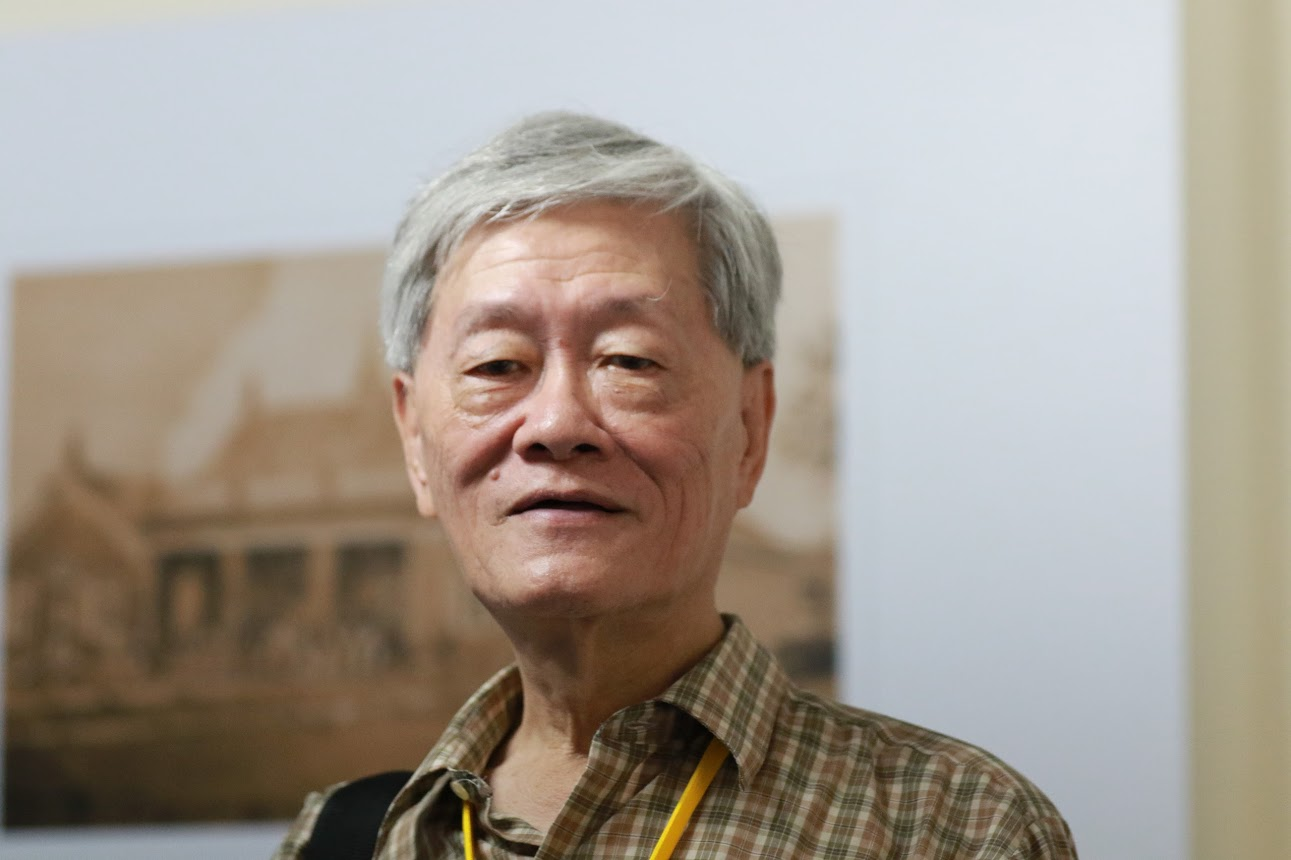
- Born: 19 June 1937; Taihoku, Taihoku Prefecture, Japanese Taiwan (present-day Taipei, Taiwan)
- Died: 15 January 2025 (aged 87); Taipei, Taiwan
- Education: Taipei Institute of Technology
- Occupations: Poet; translator
- Writing career
- Language: Taiwanese, Japanese, Mandarin, English, German
- Notable awards: Korea's Distinguished Asian Poet award (1994), the Rong-hou Taiwanese Poet Prize (1997), India's Poets International Prize (2000), Taiwan's Lai Ho Literature Prize and Premier Culture Prize (2001), the Michael Madhusadan Poet Award (2002), the Wu San-lien Prize in Literature (2004) and Poet Medal of the Mongolian Cultural Foundation (2005).

Li Kuei-hsien (Chinese: 李魁賢; pinyin: Lǐ Kuíxián; Pe̍h-ōe-jī: Lí Khoe-hiân; 19 June 1937 – 15 January 2025) was a Taiwanese author, poet, cultural critic, translator, and inventor, born in Taihoku during the period of Japanese rule. He mainly wrote poetry, but also provided reviews and translations.

Li began writing poems in 1953. He is noted for writing extended verse in Taiwanese Hokkien and represents an influential figure in the Taiwanese literature movement. Li's work today appears in multi-volume sets of collected poems published in 2001, 2002, and 2003. His "February 28th Incident Requiem" was set to music in 2008 by composer Fan-Long Ko. Translations of Li's poems have been published in Japan, Korea, Russia, New Zealand, Mongolia, India, the former Yugoslavia, Romania, Greece, Spain, the Netherlands and Canada. Li has also translated poems and edited collections of modern poems from Italy and other European sources.

Li authored Columbarium and Others and Selected Poems of Li Kuei-hsien. He died in Taipei on 15 January 2025, at the age of 87.

== Early life ==
Li's family left Taihoku for Tamsui in 1944, due to World War II, and he began attending Tamshui Junior High School in 1950, not returning to Taipei until enrolling at the Taipei Institute of Technology.

== Activities ==
Li Kuei-shien started publishing poetry in 1953. In 1964, he joined the Li Poetry. Proficient in German, he was responsible for selecting German poems. Lee also ventured into the magazine publishing industry, serving as the production editor of the Invention magazine, president of Invention World magazine, and publisher of the Invention Enterprise magazine.

Li served as chair of Taiwan's National Culture and Arts Foundation. Since 1976 he has been a member of the International Academy of Poets in England. In 1986, he established the Celebrity Publishing House and published two-book series: the Taiwan Library and the World Library. He founded the Taiwan PEN in 1987, and served as the organisation's president.

Li translated primarily German literature and is best known for his translations of Rilke. From the 1980s, he was committed to promoting international exchanges of poetry. He has also held positions such as adjunct professor at Chung Cheng University's Graduate Institute of Taiwanese Literature, executive director of the Taiwan Provincial Inventors Association (now the Taiwan International Invention Award Winners Association), first-term executive director of the Chinese Poetry Society, president of the Taiwan PEN, founding member of the International Poets Academy, and chairman of the National Culture and Arts Foundation. He was an advisor to the Li Poetry and Literary Taiwan.

Li was awarded Korea's Distinguished Asian Poet award (1994), the Rong-hou Taiwanese Poet Prize (1997), India's Poets International Prize (2000), Taiwan's Lai Ho Literature Prize and Premier Culture Prize (2001), the Michael Madhusadan Poet Award (2002), the Wu San-lien Prize in Literature (2004) and Poet Medal of the Mongolian Cultural Foundation (2005). He was nominated three times as a candidate for the Nobel Prize in Literature by the Indian International Society of Poets in 2001, 2003, and 2006.

== See also ==
- Taiwan localization

== Sources ==
- Printed program booklet, 2-28 Requiem by Fan-Long Ko. 1 DVD. National Taiwan Normal University, 2008.
