= De-Sinicization =

Social movement

Chinese name
- Traditional Chinese: 去中國化
- Simplified Chinese: 去中国化
- Hanyu Pinyin: qù Zhōngguó huà
- Literal meaning: De-Chinese-ization
Transcriptions
Standard Mandarin
- Hanyu Pinyin: qù Zhōngguó huà
- Bopomofo: ㄑㄩˋㄓㄨㄙ ㄍㄨㄛˊㄏㄨㄚˋ
Hakka
- Pha̍k-fa-sṳ: Hi-chûng-ket-fa
Yue: Cantonese
- Yale Romanization: heui jūng gwok fa
- Jyutping: Heoi3 Zung1 Gwok3 Faa3
Southern Min
- Hokkien POJ: Khìr-tiong-kok-hoa / Khì-tiong-kok-hoa / Khù-tiong-kok-hoa
- Tâi-lô: Khìr-tiong-kok-hua / Khì-tiong-kok-hua / Khù-tiong-kok-hua

Korean name
- Hangul: 탈중국화
- Hanja: 脫中國化
- Literal meaning: De-Chinese-ization
Transcriptions
- Revised Romanization: tal-Junggug-hwa

De-Sinicization or desinicization is a process of cultural or political movement aiming to eliminate or reduce Chinese cultural elements, identity or ethnic consciousness from a society or nation previously influenced by Chinese culture. In modern contexts, it is often contrasted with the assimilation process of Sinicization.

The term has its roots in attempts by ethnic Han Chinese to acculturate themselves and adopt non-Han customs, although it is now most frequently used to describe attempts by foreign countries to resist or undo Chinese influence.

In Taiwan, since 1987, de-Sinicization has been a political movement to reverse the Sinicization policies of the Chinese Nationalist Party after 1947, which many proponents allege created an environment of prejudice against the local Taiwanese Hokkien and indigenous Taiwanese population, as well as acknowledge the indigenous and multicultural character of the island of Taiwan. In Hong Kong, the term is generally associated with movements that resist centralized control of Hong Kong by the Chinese Communist Party. In North Korea and South Korea, de-Sinicization manifests itself as an opposition to Hanja or words of Chinese origin.

== Historical ==
Han dynasty General Li Ling defected to the Xiongnu and married a daughter of the Xiongnu Chanyu and acculturated to Xiongnu customs.

People of mixed ancestry or desinicized Han Chinese who adopted steppe people's culture and way of life existed in the sixth and seventh centuries A.D., and some even served in the Sui and Tang dynasties' military.

Xianbei last names were adopted by Han Chinese as was Xianbei culture, militarism and clothing. The Xianbei language was learned by several Han in the northern dynasties. Xianbei surnames were assigned to Han troops and officers in the Northern Zhou. Gao Huan and Feng Ba were Han rulers who adopted Xianbei culture. Feng Ba adopted a Xianbei name, Qizhifa 乞直伐.

All ethnicities who were of the literati were possibly called hàn ér（汉儿） because ethnic Xianbei were referred to as "damned Chinese" by the Northern Qi. Appearing as culturally Xianbei and at the same time declaring Han Chinese ancestry was done by Gao Huan and the Han family. There was Xianbeification of Han.

Xianbeification happened to some sections of the Liu and Sima Han Chinese families.

The language of the Xianbei was taught to a Han by his father who was an official.

Tujue culture and language was practiced and spoken by Tang Prince Li Chengqian. Meanwhile, several other acts of Li Chengqian, especially homosexuality, were also drawing Emperor Taizong's ire. The mixed blood northwestern families were looked down upon by the pure blood Chinese aristocratic families.

=== Liao dynasty ===
The Khitan Liao dynasty arranged for women from the Khitan royal consort Xiao clan to marry members of the Han Chinese Han (韓) clan, which originated in Jizhou (冀州) before being abducted by the Khitan and becoming part of the Han Chinese elite of the Liao and adopting Khitan culture.

The Han Chinese Geng family intermarried with the Khitan and the Han (韓) clan provided two of their women as wives to Geng Yanyi and the second one was the mother of Geng Zhixin. Empress Rende's sister, a member of the Xiao clan, was the mother of Han Chinese General Geng Yanyi.

Han Durang (Yelu Longyun) was the father of Queen dowager of State Chen, who was the wife of General Geng Yanyi and buried with him in his tomb in Zhaoyang in Liaoning. His wife was also known as "Madame Han". The Geng's tomb is located in Liaoning at Guyingzi in Chaoying.

Han clothing and Han culture was practiced by Han women who were seen as Han culture guardians in contrast to Han men who wore Khitan clothing and practiced Khitan culture.

=== Ming dynasty ===
The early Ming dynasty emperors from Hongwu to Zhengde continued Yuan practices such as hereditary military institutions, demanding Korean and Muslim concubines and eunuchs, engaging in archery and horseback riding, having Mongols serve in the Ming military, patronizing Tibetan Buddhism, with the early Ming emperors seeking to project themselves as "universal rulers" to various peoples such as Central Asian Muslims, Tibetans, and Mongols. However, this history of Ming universalism has been obscured and denied by historians who covered it up and presented the Ming as xenophobes seeking to expunge Mongol influence and presenting while they presented the Qing and Yuan as "universal" rulers in contrast to the Ming.

A cavalry based army modeled on the Yuan military was implemented by the Hongwu and Yongle Emperors. Hongwu's army and officialdom incorporated Mongols. Mongols were retained by the Ming within its territory. in Guangxi Mongol archers participated in a war against Miao minorities.

The Zhengde Emperor used Muslim eunuchs who commissioned the production of porcelain with Persian and Arabic inscriptions in white and blue color. Muslim eunuchs contributed money in 1496 to repairing Niujie Mosque. Central Asian women were provided to the Zhengde Emperor by a Muslim guard and Sayyid Hussein from Hami. The guard was Yu Yung and the women were Uighur. The emperor is remembered alongside his excessive and debauched behavior along with his concubines of foreign origin. Zhengde defeated the Mongols under Dayan Khan. Central Asian women were favored by Zhengde like how Korean women were favored by Xuande. In 1517 the Mongols were defeated by Zhengde. Mongol clothing was worn by the military enthusiastic Zhengde emperor. A Uighur concubine was kept by Zhengde like the later Qing emperor Qianlong. Foreign origin Uighur and Mongol women were favored by the Zhengde emperor. Zhengde bedded Tatar (Mongol) and Central Asian women, wore Mongol clothing, was fluent in Mongolian, and adopted Persian, Buddhist, and Mongol names and titles: 威武大將軍太師鎮國公 沙吉敖爛 大寶法王 忽必列. It is speculated that he probably studied Persian and Tibetan as well.

The Imperial exam included archery. Archery on horseback was practiced by Chinese living near the frontier. Wang Ju's writings on archery were followed during the Ming and Yuan and the Ming developed new methods of archery. Jinling Tuyong showed archery in Nanjing during the Ming. Contests in archery were held in the capital for handpicked soldiers of the Guard, who garrisoned the capital.

Equestrianism and archery were favored activities of Zhu Di (the Yongle Emperor).

Archery and equestrianism were frequent pastimes by the Zhengde Emperor. He practiced archery and horseriding with eunuchs. Tibetan Buddhist monks, Muslim women and musicians were obtained and provided to Zhengde by his guard Ch'ien Ning, who acquainted him with the ambidextrous archer and military officer Chiang Pin.

=== Qing dynasty ===
Some Han Chinese during the Ming dynasty also joined the Manchu Eight banners and became "Manchufied". The Manchu people founded the Qing dynasty.

The Han Chinese banners were known as the "Nikan" Banners, made out of a massive number of Chinese POWs and defectors. Jurchen women married most of these Chinese since they came with no family of their own. There were so many Han Chinese entering the Banners that they soon outnumbered Jurchens. Attempts by Hung Taiji were made to separate Han Chinese and Jurchen banners. In Liaodong, Chinese culture mixed with Jurchen culture. Many bannermen forged genealogies of their origin since they did not have any, and then these decided whether or not they were in a Chinese or a Jurchen banner. The Eight Banners were then created from the old black Han Chinese banners and Jurchen banners. From then on, Han and Jurchen banners were equal. The Mongol Eight banners were also created at this time, and anyone who was not classified into a Chinese or a Mongol banner became a Manchu, an ethnic group which Hung Taiji created.

Manchu bannermen and Han bannermen were not categorized according to blood or ancestry or genealogy; they were categorized by their language, culture, behavior, identification and way of life. Many Chinese bannermen (Hanjun, or Han Bannermen) were descended from Sinicized Jurchen who spoke Chinese and served the Ming, while some ethnic Manchu Bannermen (Baqi Manzhou) were of ethnic Han origins who had defected to the Jurchens, assimilated into Jurchen language and culture and lived among them in Jilin before 1618.

The Qing regarded Chinese Bannermen (Hanjun, or Han Bannermen) and the non Bannerman Han civilian general population (Han min, Han ren, minren) as separate. People were grouped into Manchu Banners and Chinese Banners (Hanjun, or Han Bannermen) not based on their ancestry, race or blood, but based on their culture and the language they spoke. Ethic Manchu banners included Han who deserted the Ming, had moved to Nurgan (Jilin) as transfrontiersmen before 1618, assimilated with the Jurchen, practiced Jurchen culture, and spoke Jurchen, while Chinese banners (Hanjun, or Han Bannermen) included descendants of sinicized Jurchen who had moved to Liaodong, adopted Han culture and surname, swore loyalty to the Ming, and spoke Chinese. Nurhaci conquered Liaodong in 1618 and created the aforementioned Chinese banners.

Before 1618, some Han actively defected to the Jurchen in Nurgan by crossing the frontier into Jurchens' territory, and scholars called these people "trans-frontiersmen." These Han then adopted Jurchen identity and later became part of Manchu Banners. In comparison, some Han in Liaodong only defected after Qing's conquest, and scholars called these people "frontiersmen." This was because Liaodong was the frontier of Ming's territory, and these people never actively tried to cross the border. After the conquest, Qing put them into Chinese Banners (Hanjun, or Han Bannermen.)

Han Chinese defectors who fled from the Ming joined the Jurchens in Nurgan before 1618 were placed into Manchu Banners and regarded as Manchu, but the Ming residents of Liaodong who were incorporated into the Eight Banners after the conquest of Liaodong from the Ming from 1618 to 1643 were placed into the separate Chinese Banners (Chinese: Hanjun, Manchu: Nikan cooha or Ujen cooha), and many of these Chinese Bannermen (Hanjun, or Han Bannermen) from Liaodong had Jurchen ancestry and were not classified as Manchu by the Qing. Nurhaci's Jianzhou Jurchen Khanate used geography, culture, language, occupation and, lifestyle to classify people as Jurchen or Nikan. Jurchen were those who lived Jurchen lifestyle, used the Jurchen language, and inhabited the original territory. Nurhaci considered those who did the opposite as Nikan (Han Chinese.) Some of these Nikan were of Korean or Jurchen ancestry but spoke Chinese and inhabited in the villages and towns of the newly conquered territory.

People from both sides often moved over the cultural and territorial division between the Ming Liaodong and Jurchen Nurgan; Han Chinese soldiers and peasants moved into Nurgan while Jurchen mercenaries and merchants moved to Liaodong, with some lineages ended up being dispersed on both sides, and the Jurchen viewed people as Nikan depending on whether they acted like Han Chinese or Jurchens. People from the same lineage, like the Sinicized Jurchen Tong lineage of Fushun in Liaodong, served both Ming and the Qing. Some, like Tong Bunian, stayed as diehard Ming loyalists, while others faithfully served the Qing after Qing's conquest of Liaodong. Qing enrolled the Tongs in the Han Plain Blue Banner. Eventually, Emperor Kangxi transferred some members of the Tong lineage, like Tong Guogang and a few of his close relatives, to the Manchu Bordered Yellow Banner because the Tongs requested the transfer.

Tong Guogang said in his application of transferring to a Manchu Banner that the Tongs were of Jurchen origin. However, the authority only transferred Tong Guogang's immediate family and company to the Manchu while leaving other Tong companies as Chinese. It was Qing's policy to transfer every closely related in-law of the emperor into a Manchu Banner, even if they were from another ethnicity. This was the most probable reason why Kangxi accepted Tong's application, despite Tong's insistence of his Jurchen origin. At the beginning of its reign, the Qing was flexible and did whatever was political expedient at the time to determine people's ethnicity. Examples were Tong's transfer from a Han to a Manchu Banner and the assimilation of Han Chinese.

The geographical, political, and cultural division was between the Ming Liaodong and the Jurchen-dominated Nurgan, which traded and interacted with Liaodong through Fushun.

Nurhaci and Hongtaiji both viewed ethnic identity as determined by culture, language, and attitude but not by ancestry (genealogy.) People could change their identities and be transferred from one ethnic banner to another. The Qing associated Mongols with the Mongolian language, nomadism, and horse related activities, Manchus with the Manchu language and foremost being part of the Banners, and Han Chinese with their residence in Liaodong, the Chinese language, agriculture, and commerce. When determining Manchu and Han identities, the Qing disregarded biological determinants and ancestry. Indeed, culture was the primary factor in differentiating between Manchu and Han, and occasionally the Qing blurred or altered people's identities. Classification of peoples was not the motive behind the creation of separate Manchu, Mongol, and Han Banners. People's membership in the different banners primarily depended on whether they spoke Manchu, Mongolian, or Chinese. It has been suggested that the Chinese Bannermen (Hanjun, or Han Bannermen) themselves were not very familiar with the exact meaning of "Hanjun", as the Qing changed the definition of what it meant to be a Manchu or a Han Bannerman.

The Manchu official Duanfang had Han Chinese ancestors originating from Zhejiang- towards the end of the Ming, they had defected to the Qing and moved to southern Manchuria from their original home in Zhejiang province, they changed their surname to Tohoro from Tao to make it sound Manchu and registered it in the Manchu Plain White Banner. Since the Manchus were willing to accept assimilated strangers, Han Chinese who defected to the Jurchens or were captured by them had integrated well into Manchu society. These Han Chinese transfrontiersman from Liaodong embraced Manchu customs and changed their names into Manchu to the point where they identified as Manchu rather than Chinese and resembles Manchus in their speech, behavior, and looks. It is hard for historians to tell whether a Manchu was originally a Han transfrontiersman since they no longer used Chinese names or regarded themselves as Han Chinese, Frederic Wakeman suggested that is evidence that the Manchu Dahai's ancestors were Han Chinese transfrontiersman. The Jurchen headman of Turun-hoton and arch-enemy of Nurhaci, Nikan Wailan, was also suggested to be a Han transfrontiersman by Wakeman, since his name literally meant "Chinese official".

The Manchu word for Han, "Nikan" was used to describe people who lived like Han Chinese and not their actual ethnic origin, the Han Bannermen (Hanjun) was not an ethnic category and the Han Banners included people of non-Han Chinese blood. When Liaodong was invaded in 1619 by Nurhaci, it became imperative for the Jurchens to secure the loyalty of the Han (Nikan) in Liaodong to their cause, by treating them equally as Jurchens were treated and even seizing Jurchen properties, grains, wealth, possessions and homes to grant them to Han, and having the aristocracy expand to include Han families in order to get Han to defect to Nurhaci's side.

Some Han Bannermen and their lineages became successful members of the Qing nobility and their descendants continued to be awarded noble titles, like that of Li Yongfang who was ennobled by Nurhaci as third class viscount and enrolled in the Plain Blue Chinese Banner (Hanjun, or Han Banner), and his descendants continued to be nobles to the final years of Qianlong's rule and were ennobled with even greater titles. The Manchus gave extensive titles and honors and marriage to Aisin Gioro women to pre-1644 Han defectors, like the marriage of Nurhaci's granddaughter to Li Yongfang and his sons registered in the Chinese Plain Blue banner (Hanjun, or Han Banner), and the title granted to the son of a Ming defector, Sun Sike (Sun Ssu-k'o) in the Chinese Plain White Banner, (Hanjun, or Han Banner) and the marriage of one of Kangxi's daughters to his son.

At the beginning of the Qing, originally the sharpest distinction was drawn by Qing policy to emphasize difference between Han civilians and all Bannermen, and not between Chinese Bannermen (Hanjun, or Han Bannermen) and Manchu Bannermen. The Manchus used Nikan to describe Ming subjects in Liaodong who lived a Chinese lifestyle like sinicized Jurchens, Mongols, and Koreans, and not as a racial term for ethnic Han Chinese. A person only had to be originally a Ming subject and not ethnic Chinese to get categorized as a Han bannerman so people of Jurchen origin ended up in Mongol and Chinese Banners. Nurhaci used culture to categorize people and allowed Han transfrontiersmen to identify as Manchu after assimilating, and ethnicity was regarded as flexible when Han Chinese and Mongols families were moved by Kangxi to Manchu Banners from their original Mongol and Chinese Banners (Hanjun, or Han Banners).

Li Yongfang's rewards for surrendering Fushun to the Jurchens and defecting included promotion in rank, Nurhaci's granddaughter as a wife, battling along with Nurhaci and induction into the Jin aristocracy as a Chinese frontiersman, which was different from how Nurhaci handled both the Han transfrontiersmen who assimilated into Manchu identity and captured Han bondservants. The Chinese frontiersman were inducted into the Han Banners. Nurhaci offered to reward Li Yongfang with promotion and special treatment if he surrendered Fushun reminding him of the grim fate that would await him and Fushun's residents if they continued to resist. Freeholder status was given to Li Yongfang's 1,000 troops after his surrender, and the later Chinese Bannermen (Hanjun, or Han Bannermen) Bao Chengxian and Shi Tingzhu also experience good fortune in Qing service after their surrenders in 1622 at Guangning.

Nurhaci used semi-literate interlocutors of Han (Nikan) origin to translate between different languages and trusted them a lot, developing close and friendly personal relations with some of them like Kanggūri and Fanggina. The Han Chinese Gong Zhenglu (Gong Zhengliu) who was abducted in the 1580s by the Jurchens from Liaodong with tens of thousands of others, originally came from Shaoxing in Zhejiang became a close confidant of Nurhaci and tutoring his sons, adopting the Manchu name Onoi, and being showered with wives, slaves, and a house by Nurhaci.

The Manchu leader Nurhaci embarked on the conquest of Liaodong from the Ming dynasty, luring Han Chinese to his side to defect by threatening them with destruction and at the same time also promising them rewards, with important positions. A massive revolt against the Jurchens by the Liaodong Chinese broke out in 1623, due to the Jurchens squeezing the Chinese for labor and stationing Jurchen in Chinese households. Acts of sabotage and slaughter of the Jurchen were carried out by the Chinese rebels in retaliation. Hong Taiji, who succeeded Nurhaci, began to include many Chinese in his government and copy the Chinese style of governing. After defeats inflicted by the Chinese General Yuan Chonghuan upon the Manchus with artillery such as at the Battle of Ningyuan, the Manchu then decided to absorb Han Chinese prisoners who knew how to use guns into their army to supplement their forces.

The Manchus also lured Han Chinese Generals into defecting and joining the Banners by marrying them to women from the Imperial Aisin Gioro family. One Han Chinese General, Li Yongfang (Li Yung-fang) was bribed by the Manchus into defecting by being married to an Aisin Gioro wife, and being given a position in the banners. Many more Han Chinese abandoned their posts and joined the Manchus. A mass marriage of Han Chinese to Manchu women numbering 1,000 took place in 1632 after Prince Yoto came up with the idea. They were either generals or officials. It was said by the Manchu leader that "since the Chinese generals and Manchu women lived together and ate together, it would help these surrendered generals to forget their motherland." Women from the Imperial family were also married to other Han Chinese officials like the Three Feudatories' sons, who defected to the Qing after their conquest of China. The Manchus also created an artillery unit out of Han Chinese, which they used against the Ming army. Han Chinese were also lured by the Manchus into defecting and entering their employ in civil service by granting them privileges such as calling themselves "ministers", while Manchus in the same position were regarded as "slaves".

The Han who classified in different ways had come under Manchu rule in three different eras, before 1618 the Han "transfrontiersmen" who threw in their lot with Nurhaci were effectively only Han Chinese by ancestry and blood since they practiced Jurchen culture and became part of Manchu companies (Niru) within Manchu Banners, while from 1618 to 1622 the Han captured in Liaodong and Liaoxi became either bondservants to Manchu Banners or Han Bannermen, and then finally the Han who deserted the Ming during Hong Taiji's rule to join the Manchu, and these were first placed into separate all Han companies (Niru) attached to Manchu Banners, and then when in 1642 the Manchu Banners ejected all their Han companies they were placed into separate Chinese Banners (Hanjun, or Han Banners) since they were the mostly not assimilated to Jurchen culture.

At Guangning, Shi Tingzhu, a Ming soldier of Jurchen descent but who practiced Chinese culture, had surrendered to Nurhaci's Later Jin in 1622 along with Bao Chengxian and they were eventually placed into Chinese Banners (Hanjun, or Han Banners), after Bao suggested creating separate Chinese Banners (Hanjun, or Han Banners). Neither were all Han Chinese in the Eight Banners part of the Chinese Banners (Hanjun, or Han Banners), nor was the Chinese Banners (Hanjun, or Han Banners) made out of only Han Chinese, Han Banner membership did not automatically mean they were actual Han Chinese.

The Jurchens under Nurhaci had classified people as Han Chinese (Nikan) according to whether they were former Ming subjects, behaved like Han Chinese, had a Chinese lifestyle, spoke Chinese language, dressed like Han Chinese, and had Han Chinese names, and all Jurchens who had moved to Ming China adopted Chinese surnames. Chinese Bannermen (Hanjun, or Han Bannermen) rose to many powerful positions and prominence under Shunzhi, these Chinese Bannermen (Hanjun, or Han Bannermen) were descendants of Han defectors in Liaodong who joined Nurhaci and Hong Taiji, in the third or second generation. They "were barely distinguishable from Manchu nobility." Geng Zhongming, a Han bannerman, was awarded the title of Prince Jingnan, and his son Geng Jingmao managed to have both his sons Geng Jingzhong and Geng Zhaozhong become court attendants under Shunzhi and married Aisin Gioro women, with Haoge's (a son of Hong Taiji) daughter marrying Geng Jingzhong and Prince Abatai's granddaughter marrying Geng Zhaozhong.

The mistaken views applied to Chinese Bannermen (Hanjun, or Han Bannermen) about race and ethnicity missed the fact that they were actually a "cultural group" since a person could be a Chinese Bannermen (Hanjun, or Han Bannermen) without having to be an actual Han Chinese. It was Qianlong who redefined the identity of Han Bannermen by saying that they were to be regarded as of having the same culture and being of the same ancestral extraction as Han civilians, this replaced the earlier opposing ideology and stance used by Nurhaci and Hong Taiji who classified identity according to culture and politics only and not ancestry, but it was Qianlong's view on Chinese Bannermen (Hanjun, or Han Bannermen) identity which influenced the later historians and expunged the earlier Qing stance.

Qianlong also promulgated an entirely new view of the Han Bannermen different from his grandfather Kangxi, coming up with the abstract theory that loyalty in itself was what was regarded as the most important, so Qianlong viewed those Han Bannermen who had defected from the Ming to the Qing as traitors and compiled an unfavorable biography of the prominent Chinese Bannermen (Hanjun, or Han Bannermen) who had defected to the Qing, while at the same time Qianlong had compiled a biography to glorify Ming loyalists who were martyred in battle against the Qing called "Record of Those Martyred for Their Dynasty and Sacrificed for Purity". Some of Qianlong's inclusions and omissions on the list were political in nature, like including Li Yongfang out of Qianlong's dislike for his descendant Li Shiyao and excluding Ma Mingpei out of concern for his son Ma Xiongzhen's image.

From 1618 to 1629, the Han Chinese from eastern Liaodong who joined the Eight Banners were known as "tai nikan", the Han who defected to the Qing at Fushun were known as Fushan Nikan and were considered part of the Tai Nikan. The Tai Nikan were distinguished from the later Han Chinese who joined the banners between 1629-1643 and originated from western Liaodong, Shanxi, Shandong, and Zhili, and were known as "fu xi baitangga". Both groups were part of the Chinese Banners before the Qing crossed over Shanhai pass in 1644, and as such were both distinguished from Han who were incorporated into the Chinese Banners after 1644 when the Qing ruled China. The pre-1644 Chinese Bannermen were known as "old men" 旧人 . A mass transfer into the Manchu banners of every single Fushun Nikan, and specifically chosen tai nikan, Koreans, and Mongols was enacted by the Qianlong Emperor in 1740.

Manchu Bannermen in Beijing were driven into poverty just decades after the conquest, living in slums and falling into debt, with signs of their plight appearing as soon as 1655. They were driven to the point where they had to sell their property to Han Chinese, in violation of the law.

Originally in the early Qing the Qing emperors both took some Han Chinese as concubines and a 1648 decree from Shunzhi allowed Han Chinese men to marry Manchu women from the Banners with the permission of the Board of Revenue if they were registered daughters of officials or commoners or the permission of their banner company captain if they were unregistered commoners, it was only later in the dynasty that these policies were done away with and the Qing enacted new policies in their xiunu system of drafting Banner girls for the Imperial Harem by excluding daughters of Han commoners.

Chinese Bannermen (Hanjun, or Han Bannermen) frequently married Han civilian women and this was permitted by the Qing emperors, however the Qing emperors were distressed to find girls in the Banners as a result of these intermarriages following Han civilian customs in clothing and jewelry when they ended up being drafted for palace service. The Qing formulated policies to remove and shut out daughters of common Chinese Bannermen (Hanjun, or Han Bannermen) from serving in the Imperial palace as maids and consorts, exempting them from the draft, asserting that it was doing it out of concern due to the economic plight of Chinese Bannermen (Hanjun, or Han Bannermen), however, it may have been doing this after the Qing court was alarmed to find girls from Chinese Banners (Hanjun, or Han Banners) following Han Chinese civilian customs like wearing robes with wide sleeves, feet binding, and wearing a single earring, all of which were contrary to Manchu custom, daughters of Manchu and Mongol bannerman still had to submit to the draft where they would be selected to serve in the Imperial palace as maids or potential consorts. Daughters of Han Bannermen were exempt from having to submit themselves to palace service. It was not permitted for daughters of Chinese Banner (Hanjun, or Han Banner) to enter the selection as concubines to the emperor.

The Manchu bannermen typically used their given name to address themselves and not their family names, while Han bannermen used their family name and given name in normal Chinese style.

A lot of Han Chinese bannermen adopted Manchu names, which may have been motivated by associating with the elite. One Han Chinese bannerman named Cui Zhilu who knew Manchu had changed his name to the Manchu Arsai, and the emperor asked him how he came about his name. Chinese bannermen also adopted Manchu personal naming practices like giving numbers as personal names.

Chinese bannermen (Hanjun, or Han Bannermen) manchufied their family names by adding "giya" at the end. However, some Han Chinese bannermen like Zhao Erfeng, Zhao Erxun and Cao Xueqin did not use Manchu names. A lot of other Han Chinese bannermen used Manchufied names, one Han bannermen with a Manchu name of Deming also had a separate Chinese name, Zhang Deyi.

Within the Manchu banner companies, there were various Han Chinese and Mongol persons dispersed among them, and there were Mongol, Korean, Russian, and Tibetan companies in the Manchu Banners. The Manchu Banners had two main divisions between the higher ranking "Old Manchus" (Fo Manzhou, Fe Manju) made out of the main Jurchen tribes like the Jianzhou whom Nurhaci and Hong Taiji created the Manchu Banners from, and the lower ranking "New Manchus" (Chinese transliteration: 伊車滿洲. 衣車滿洲 Yiche Manzhou; Chinese translation: 新滿洲; Manchu: Ice Manju) made out of other Tungusic and Mongolic tribes like the Daur, (Dawoer), Oroqen (Elunchun), Solun (Suolun), Hezhe, Kiakar (Kuyula), and Xibe (Xibo) from the northeast who were incorporated into the Manchu Banners by Shunzhi and Kangxi after the 1644 Qing invasion of Ming China, in order for them to fight for the Qing against the Russian Empire in the Amur River Basin.

== De-Sinicization elsewhere ==
=== Hong Kong ===
Since the British handover of Hong Kong to China in 1997, and increasingly since the mid-2000s when travel restrictions on Mainland Chinese citizens to Hong Kong eased, there has been increasing tension between the local Hong Kong population with the Chinese central government and the Mainland-origin population. While a Hong Kong identity has been present since the colonial period, it became stronger and more pronounced over the last decade, with 53% of Hong Kong residents identifying themselves as solely Hong Kong residents but not Chinese residents (while the figure is over 75% among residents aged 18–29), and 78% of Hong Kong residents identifying themselves as both "Hong Kong citizens" and "Chinese citizens". Furthermore, some youth population of Hong Kong do not even identify themselves as broadly, and ethnically, "Chinese". Less than a fifth of Hong Kongers now identify themselves as exclusively "Chinese".

As a British colony for over 150 years, the culture of Hong Kong is unique in its blending of Western and Chinese elements. This cultural difference has been emphasized and embraced by some to distinguish Hong Kong from mainland China. Hong Kong Cantonese differs from other Cantonese varieties as used in the Mainland province of Guangdong, in large part due to the influence of Hong Kong English and code-switching in Hong Kong.

Language differences also play a major role in separating Hong Kong identity from mainland Chinese identity. While Mandarin is the official variety of Chinese in mainland China, the regionally traditional Cantonese variant has long been used in Hong Kong. The increasing presence of Mandarin-speakers in the territory since 1997, and expectations of mainland Chinese for Hong Kong residents to speak Mandarin, has caused conflicts and defensive measures by citizens to protect Cantonese against the encroachment of Mandarin. Such actions include stigmatizing Mandarin as a language of communism, while Cantonese and English language are perceived as languages of democracy; reflecting the political differences between Hong Kong and China. This political linguistic view has also spread among Overseas Chinese communities, the majority of which are historically Cantonese-speaking.

The lack of democratic development in Hong Kong has further eroded a sense of a Chinese identity. Under the one country, two systems policy agreed between the United Kingdom and China as a condition of Hong Kong's return, the territory is guaranteed the right to retain its free way of life for at least 50 years after 1997. However, increasing attempts from the Beijing government to curb democratic institutions and free speech, including the delay of eventual universal suffrage, have drawn continual protests and unrest among locals. This cumulated in the 2014 Hong Kong protests, when the Chinese Communist Party allowed Hong Kongers to vote for the territory's chief executive under the condition that Beijing first approves of the running candidates. The political crises have led to a strengthening of a local Hong Kong identity, with an independence movement beginning to take form as a result.

=== Taiwan ===
Following the retrocession of Taiwan from Japan to the Republic of China in 1945, the Kuomintang-led government promoted a "resinicization" of the island's population, sponsoring Chinese calligraphy, traditional Chinese painting, folk art, and Chinese opera.

De-Sinicization occurred most rapidly between 1992 and 2005, according to a survey by the National Chengchi University about national identity in Taiwan. Identification as "Chinese" during this time dropped from 26.2% to 7.3%, "Taiwanese" identity increased from 17.3% to 46.5%, and identification as both Taiwanese and Chinese dropped from 45.4% to 42.0%. The autocratic administrations of Chiang Kai-shek and Chiang Ching Kuo claimed legitimacy as pan-Chinese leaders because the Republic of China's National Assembly was elected from all over China (in 1947), rather than just from Taiwan. However, the Lee Teng-hui administration (1988–2000) began to desinicize the polity by abolishing this Assembly in 1991, to form a parliamentary body with a Taiwan-only electorate. In academia, de-Sinicization in the late 1980s and 1990s resulted in the replacement of the word "China" in the names of institutions to "Taiwan", creating the "Taiwan Legal Association", "Taiwan Political Science Association", "Taiwan Sociological Association", and "Taiwan History Association". As part of this movement, some Taiwanese historians downplayed the abuses of Japan's colonial administration, referring to it as "rule" rather than "occupation"; and the Taiwan History Association claimed that Taiwan's history was a part of Japanese, rather than Chinese, history.

In 2001, proponents of Taiwanization began characterizing de-Sinicization 2001 as a part of the movement to emphasize a local Taiwan-based identity in opposition to the political leadership that had historically identified with China and Chinese culture.

De-Sinicization accelerated under the Chen Shui-bian administration (2000–2008), with the pro-Taiwan independence Democratic Progressive Party in control of the Executive Yuan. Chen's Minister of Education, Tu Cheng-sheng, directed the rewriting of high school history textbooks to abolish the "remnants of greater Chinese consciousness" (大中國意識的沈痾). This textbook's de-Sinicization included the separation of Taiwanese history and Chinese history into separate volumes, a ban on the term mainland China, and the portrayal of Chinese immigration to Taiwan during the Qing dynasty as "colonization".

Concurrently, Chen introduced the One Country on Each Side concept in 2002, which posited that China and Taiwan are separate countries, while ordering the addition of the words "Issued in Taiwan" on Republic of China passports. That same year, Tu's department chose to invent its own romanization system for Mandarin Chinese, Tongyong Pinyin, designed by a Taiwanese scholar rather than adopting the internationally well-known Hanyu Pinyin system developed by the People's Republic of China and used in other countries such as Singapore and Malaysia. In 2003, the government abolished the longstanding policy of using Mandarin as the sole language of government, which in practice promoted the second-largest language on the island, Taiwanese Hokkien, to fulfill many of the functions of a national language. From 2004, the map of the "Republic of China" no longer includes mainland China.

From 2005, Chen's Executive Yuan also initiated the Taiwan Name Rectification Campaign, which sought to remove the words "China" or "Chinese" from public and private organizations. This included the renaming of state bodies such as the "Overseas Chinese Affairs Council" (which became the "Overseas Community Affairs Council"), persuading private organizations like China Airlines to change their name, and also the purging of references to mainland China in nearly 100 administrative laws. In 2006, Chen abolished the National Unification Council and its Guidelines for National Unification. In February 2007, Chen's government changed the name of Chunghwa Post (China Post) to Taiwan Post, Chinese Petroleum Company to "CPC Corporation, Taiwan, and China Shipbuilding Corporation to "CSBC Corporation, Taiwan".

The name changing issue was a topic in the Republic of China presidential elections in Taiwan in March 2008. Former Taipei mayor Ma Ying-Jeou was elected as the President, whereupon he sought to reverse some of the de-Sinicization policies of Chen. On 1 August 2008, the postal service resolved to reverse the name change and restore the name "Chunghwa Post". As of 1 January 2009, Tongyong Pinyin was abolished by the government in favor of Hanyu Pinyin. On 28 September 2009, Ma celebrated the 2559th birthday of Confucius at the Taiwan Confucian Temple, which was built in 1665. And on 1 January 2011, President Ma entitled his New Year's address "Building up Taiwan, Invigorating Chinese Heritage", which stressed "Chinese culture and virtues, such as benevolence, righteousness, filial devotion, respect for teachers, kindness, and simplicity".

In the run-up to the 2024 Taiwanese general election, mainland China controlled Xinhua News accused the Democratic Progressive Party (DPP) of undertaking a de-sinicization campaign in the education sector.

=== Japan ===
Around the time of the Meiji Restoration, debates arose in Japan regarding the "Datsu-A Ron" (Leaving Asia theory) and the perceived backwardness of China, leading to discussions on whether to abolish Kanji (Chinese characters) and fully adopt Kana or the Roman alphabet. Ultimately, the idea of reducing the number of Kanji, proposed by Fukuzawa Yukichi, became mainstream. In 1873, he compiled the elementary school textbook Moji no Oshie (The Teaching of Characters), stating in its preface that although Kanji are difficult to learn, the Japanese language already contains a large accumulation of them, making immediate abolition impractical. He suggested initially limiting Kanji usage, with the goal of eventual abolition when circumstances allowed. In his own textbook, he used only 802 Kanji.

After World War II, under the suggestion of the Supreme Commander for the Allied Powers (GHQ) to promote the Romanization of Japanese, the Japanese government established the Tōyō Kanji list (General Use Kanji) in 1946, which was intended to strictly limit the number of Kanji used, with the ultimate goal of complete abolition. However, in the 1980s, the Tōyō Kanji list was replaced by the Jōyō Kanji list (Regular Use Kanji), and the abolition of Kanji was no longer the objective.This is because Kana are not purely phonetic characters; for example, Kana do not indicate pitch accents (アクセント). Both "chopsticks" (箸) and "bridge" (橋) are written as "はし" (hashi). In Kana, "chopsticks" (箸) is pronounced as "はし" with a high-low pitch pattern (háshi), while "bridge" (橋) is pronounced as "はし" with a low-high pitch pattern (hashí). When speaking, the meaning of words must be distinguished by these pitch patterns. Writing without Kanji would cause confusion due to homophones.

=== Vietnam ===
Hoa people, or ethnic Chinese in Vietnam, form a significant minority in the country with a presence traced from the Nanyue era and became organized since the foundation of Later Lê dynasty. Chinese immigration to Vietnam peaked during the late 19th to mid-20th century, when China experienced political turmoil and life quality stagnation, as well the communist takeover in 1949 and business incentives provided by the French colonial government. The Hoa largely integrated well, forming a large portion of the Vietnam's middle and upper class and playing an important role in its economy. In addition to their native dialects and/or Cantonese (the lingua franca of Chinese in Southeast Asia), Vietnamese proficiency rates among the Hoa were extremely high and were the largest among Vietnam's ethnic minority groups. Most Hoa eventually considered themselves as Vietnamese first and then Chinese, with those with origins not from mainland China identifying themselves to their specific place, such as "Hong Kong Chinese" or "Macau Chinese", especially in South Vietnam.

Following the Fall of Saigon and communist reunification of the Vietnam, most Hoa in the former South Vietnam opted to immigrate to other countries, especially the United States, France and Australia. Only ethnic Chinese persecuted by government in northern Vietnam chose to immigrate back to China, especially to Guangxi Province. Overseas Chinese with origins from Vietnam usually interact with both local Chinese and Vietnamese communities. However, the presence of non-Cantonese speaking and/or mainland Chinese-descended communities results in the community identifying itself with the Vietnamese community instead, as in the case with the Chinese community in France.

=== North Korea ===
Using Hanja (한자,漢字), or Chinese characters in Korean language, was banned in 1949 in North Korea by Kim Il Sung. Kim banned the use of hanja because he viewed the abolishment of hanja as a symbol of decolonization and Korean nationalism.

=== South Korea ===
Former Mayor of Seoul Lee Myung-bak's move to change Seoul's official Chinese name from Hancheng (漢城) to Shou'er (首爾) in 2005 is a model of de-Sinicization. The previous name, pronounced Hànchéng in Mandarin and Hanseong in Korean, is an old name for Seoul. Hanseong was derived from the Han River, and literally means "Walled City on the Han (Wide) River" but the name can be misinterpreted as Han Chinese City. The new name Shou'er carried no such connotation, and was close in both sound and meaning to Seoul, which, uniquely among Korean place names, does not have a Sino-Korean name. See also Names of Seoul.

=== Kyrgyzstan ===
The Dungans of Kyrgyzstan represent a less conscious process of de-Sinicization, during which, over the course of a little more than a century (since the Hui Minorities' War), a Hui population became alienated from the literary tradition and local culture of Shaanxi and Gansu.

== See also ==
- Cultural Revolution
- Sinocentrism
- Sinicization
- Hong Kong
  - Hong Kong Independence Movement
  - Hong Kong Autonomy Movement
- Taiwan
  - Taiwanese nationalism
  - Taiwan Independence Movement
