= Ko Fan-long =

Taiwanese composer

Ko Fan-long 柯芳隆
- Born: 1947 (age 77–78)
- Origin: Taiwan
- Occupation: Composer

Ko Fan-long (Chinese: 柯芳隆; pinyin: Kē Fānglóng; born 1947) is a Taiwanese composer. He is a professor of composition at the National Taiwan Normal University (NTNU) in Taipei. (Ko's family name is pronounced "Kuh", as in the English word cup.)

== Life and career ==
Ko, a native of Taichung, is himself a graduate of NTNU. In 1980 he enrolled at the Berlin University of the Arts (Germany) where he studied composition with F. M. Beyer. He joined the NTNU faculty upon his return to Taiwan in 1985. In 2002 he received Taiwan's prestigious Wan San-Lien Music Award. From 2004 to 2008 he served as chair of the NTNU Department of Music.

Ko's compositions display a cosmopolitan blend of European and Asian timbres and techniques. He often calls upon performers to switch concepts within a single piece, sounding first like an instrument from nineteenth-century Austria and the next like an instrument from ancient Tibet. Compositions by Ko that have drawn particular acclaim include the Quintet II (1992) for chamber ensemble, The Crying Mermaid (1993) for orchestra, the imposing three-movement Dream of the Year 2000 for chorus and orchestra, and Overture to Taiwan's New Century (2003) for orchestra.

In 2004 three of his major orchestral works—the symphony Dream of the Year 2000, the overture Taiwan's New Century and The Crying Mermaid—were featured in an NTNU tour program entitled Rondo Capriccio. The works were performed by Apo Hsu conducting the NTNU Symphony Orchestra. In 2007 the three works were featured again in the orchestra's American tour program entitled Formosa Dreaming. The works were performed by Apo Hsu conducting the NTNU Symphony Orchestra and Formosa Festival Choir prepared by Huang Tsui-yu. The tour program also featured the music of Taiwan composer Tyzen Hsiao and included four soloists: Hsieh Meng-chieh (soprano), Yü Lee (alto), Lin Chung-chi (tenor), and Chang Yu-hsin (bass). The premier of Ko's 2-28 Requiem took place soon after, in April 2008. This performance was also by Apo Hsu and the NTNU Symphony,

In 2008 Ko observed that "Taiwanese poems are elegant and boast unique intonation." His current interest, he announced, lies in composing "grand works that combine Taiwanese song with Western orchestration" that "integrate the orchestral sonority with Taiwanese native features."

== Works ==
- 1971 Sacrificial Ceremony for violin and piano
- 1972 Chang'e as a Rocket for solo piano
- 1973 Duet for Clarinet and Piano
- 1974 Ripples in Ma-Zu for solo piano
- 1980 Change for cello and piano
- 1981 Trio for Oboe, Violoncello and Piano
- 1982 Growth and Decline of Five Elements for four cellos
- 1982 Sextet for Flute, Clarinet, Bassoon, French Horn, Violin and Violoncello
- 1983 Septet for Flute, Clarinet, Strings and Percussion
- 1984 String Quartet no. 1
- 1984 Sedan Chair of the Gods for full orchestra
- 1985 Duet for Oboe and Violoncello
- 1986 Sedan Chair for a Wedding for flute, oboe, horn, violin, cello and piano
- 1988 Mend the Torn Silk for chorus
- 1992 Quintet II for violin, cello, flute, trombone, and percussion
- 1993 The Crying Mermaid for orchestra
- 1994 Four Hakka Ballads for clarinet, violin, cello and piano
- 1996 First Time (Taiwanese song)
- 1997 Sacrifice for piano trio
- 1998 Artistic Conception for solo piano
- 1999 Formosa String Quartet no. 2
- 2000 Dream of the Year 2000, a three-movement symphony for chorus and orchestra
- 2000 Love Story for seven bassoons
- 2001 When the Bugle Calls for trumpet and four horns
- 2002 Taiwanese Folk Song Suite for strings
- 2003 Water Lantern on February 28 (Taiwanese song)
- 2003 Overture to Taiwan's New Century for full orchestra
- 2008 2-28 Requiem (text by Li Kuei-Hsien)

== Recordings ==
=== Video ===
- 2-28 Requiem (2008). 1 DVD. Concert given 7 April 2008 by Apo Ching-Hsin Hsu conducting the National Taiwan Normal University Symphony Orchestra with Chorus and Soloists. National Taiwan Normal University.
- Formosa Dreaming (2007). 1 DVD. Concert given 9 September 2007 by Apo Ching-Hsin Hsu conducting the National Taiwan Normal University Symphony Orchestra and Formosa Festival Chorus. Soprano: Meng-Chieh Hsieh. Alto: Yü Lee. Tenor: Ying-Tung Hsieh. Bass: Yu-Hsin Chang. Venue: San Gabriel Civic Auditorium, Los Angeles, California USA. Repertoire by Ko includes Overture to Taiwan's New Century, The Weeping Mermaid, and Dream of the Year 2000. The program also features music by Tyzen Hsiao. Tyzen Hsiao Music Association with National Taiwan Normal University.

== Sources ==
- Ko, printed comments, 2-28 Requiem concert program and DVD insert. National Taiwan Normal University, Taipei, 2008-04-07. (Source of quote)
- Printed program, Formosa Dreaming, Taiwan International Culture Association, Taipei, 2007-09-04. (Source of biographical data and repertory list)

== See also ==
- National Taiwan Normal University
- February 28 Incident
- Requiem
