= Wen-Pin Hope Lee =

- 李和莆
- Born: 1967 (age 58–59)
- Occupation: Artist

Wen-Pin Hope Lee (Chinese: 李和莆; born 1967) is a Hoklo Taiwanese contemporary music composer and Professor. His works comprise a variety of genres, including symphonies, theatre, dance, solo works, chamber music, computer music, and multimedia performance art. In 2004 he began his Taiwan Series of compositions: a body of work inspired by Taiwanese culture, including Indigenous peoples and Hakka melodies, sung texts in Taiwanese, and the ambient sounds of Taiwan locales. Lee is the winner of the 2006 Golden Melody Award for Best Composer of Traditional and Artistic Music and a nominee for the 2007 Golden Melody Award for his recording of his five-act theatre dance piece Hsiahai City God through Water of Mengjia. In 2013, Lee won an award for his collaborative work with Radio Taiwan International on “Happiness on March” at 48th Golden Bell Awards.

Lee resides in Taipei, where he teaches composition at his alma mater, the National Taiwan Normal University. He has served as the head of the pop-songwriting department since 2016. He is also active in the leadership of the Sonare Symphony Orchestra in Taipei.

== Education ==
Lee first experiences with music were as a child under the tutelage of pianist Chiu-chin Lai (賴秋鏡). At the age of 17 he began studies in composition and music theory with Prof. Chin-yow Lin (林進祐). He entered the bachelor's program at the National Taiwan Normal University (NTNU) the following year; his teachers were Shing-kwei Tzeng (曾興魁), Mao-shuen Chen (陳茂萱) and Shu-shi Chen (陳樹熙). Upon graduation Lee moved to America for graduate studies in composition and music theory at the Boston University. His teachers in Boston were Lukas Foss, Theodore Antoniou and Marjorie Merryman. Lee was awarded the Doctor of Musical Arts degree in composition in 1999. Lee received his doctorate of musical arts (D.M.A.) in January, 1999.

== Academic work ==
He return to Taiwan as the composition teacher at the NTNU, also teaches music at the Affiliated Senior High School of NTNU. In 2015, he was charge as director of "Master's Program in Pop Music", his notable students are Danny Shao and Ying-Ke, this course was discontinue in 2019, which later transformed to The "Digital Media Center Music Interactive Laboratory". He is active as the artistic director of the Sonare Symphony Orchestra and as executive of Music Dimensions, an ensemble devoted to the performance of new Taiwanese music. In 2021, Wen-Pin Hope Lee, Chien-Te Fan (National Tsing Hua University Professor) and Gwan-Hwan Hwang (another NTNU professor) founded the Inciting International Intellectual Property Company, which actively focuses on the intellectual property right of Blockchain technology management and protection. In November, 2021, Lee’s work of “The Song of Tunnel-Taipei Impression” NFT was bidden for more than one million NTD, which marks the beginning of integration between Asian classical music and NFTs in the metaverse and check the link below for more information . In 2021, Wen-Pin Hope Lee, Chien-Te, Fan (National Tsing Hua University Professor) and Gwan-Hwan Hwang (National Taiwan Normal University Professor) founded Inciting International Intellectual Property Company, The company actively focuses on the management and protection of intellectual property rights in Blockchain technology. 2024【BUZZHOOD】Intellectual property management platform officially launched online. In September 2022, the first popular song "No way out" (composition of lyrics and music)and the second popular song "Landing" (2023) were released and released digitally around the world.

== Musical works ==
Lee’s works consist of a variety of solo music, chamber music, symphonies, theater dance, film scoring and popular music. In recent years, Lee has been active in cross-disciplinary art, combining interactive images with all kinds of theatrical productions of dances, drama, and musicals. Lee has also written a great number of works in musical, popular music, and commercial scoring, establishing himself as one of the most important composers of crossover music in Taiwan.

Since 2004, Lee has pivoted his work around the theme of Taiwan Series and his latest representative works include the following:

=== Orchestral music ===
- NTNU Master: Symphonic Capriccio Academic Festival Overture for Soprano, Mezzo, Tenor, Baritone, Mixed Choir, and Orchestra (2019, commissioned by the National Taiwan Normal University)
- Legends from the South Seas: The Southern City of Anping (2019, commissioned by the Taipei Chinese Orchestra)
- That's the World but ME Concerto for Viola and Orchestra (2017, commissioned by the Sun Taipei Philharmonic)
- Classical Series on Nature : Taiwanese Mountains Summit Images of Taiwan (Orchestra, 2012, commissioned by the National Culture and Arts Foundation, 2012)
- Summit Images of Taiwan for the Classical Series of Taiwan’s Mountains and Nature (2011, commissioned and supported by Taipei City Government Department of Cultural Affairs, and the National Culture and Arts Foundation, 2008)
- Taiwan March: Five Orchestral Pieces (commissioned and supported by The 21st Summer Deaflympics, Taipei, 2009)
- Nine Tones and Eighteen Tunes (The Formosa Series: Orchestra), tunes from various regions of Hakka in Taiwan, inspired by Six Hakka Folk Tunes, Concerto for Solo Violin and Orchestra (commissioned and supported by Taipei City Government Department of Cultural Affairs, 2007)
- Hakka Ballad Expressions (The Formosa Series: Orchestra) (2007) Three widely-spread Hakka tunes originated from Kaohsiung County (commissioned and supported by Council for Hakka Affairs, Executive Yuan, Republic of China (Taiwan), 2007)
- Mahakaruna Dharani, Symphonic Poem For Mixed Chorus (Soloists) and Orchestra (2005, commissioned by the Dharma Drum Mountain Foundation)

=== Chamber music ===
- Pestles: Tribal Fables Sonata No. 1 for Cello and Piano (2018)
- Piano Quintet: A Castle between Light and Shadow (2018)
- Chanting, Enchanted, Six Melodies from Taiwanese Songs for violin and viola (2017)
- Indigenous and Unbeatable for Flute, Cajon, and String Orchestra (2017)
- For Piano Quintet: A Castle between Light and Shadow (2017)
- Legend of Goldenwoodwind (2017)
- Cantabile Moderato, the Theme for the 2012 Kaohsiung International Audio Show (2011)
- Taiwan: Four Seasons, Octet for Strings (2011)
- The Formosa Image: Taiwan Series, Twelve Preludes for Piano (2010)
- The Formosa Image, Three Concert Pieces for the 2010 Shanghai World Expo (2010)
- Three Ballads from Taiwanese Aborigines, Sonata No. 1 for Viola and Piano (2007)
- Tunes from Various Regions of Hakka in Taiwan, Six Hakka Folk Tunes for Quartet-Clarinet, Violin, Violoncello and Piano (2007)
- Tunes from Various Regions in Taiwan, Six Fu-Lao Folk Tunes for Violoncello Duet (2006)
- Taiwan is Formosa, Six Fu-Lao Folk Tunes for Violoncello Quartet (2006, the 17th Golden Melody Award-winning piece)
- Water of the Field in June, Six Fu-Lao Folk Tunes for Solo Violin and Strings (2005)
- Three Scenes of the Pei-Gang, Three Fu-Lao Folk Tunes for Violin and Violoncello (2005)

=== Dance music ===
- The Drifting Fate of Hakka, A Hakka Dance Drama in Four Acts (2014)
- Hsiahai City God Through Water of Mengjia, A Digital Music Theater of Five Acts (2006, nominated by the 18th Golden Melody Award for both the Best Album Producer and the Best Performance)
- All Rise when the Wind Blows, A Dance Drama in One Act (2005, commissioned by National Taichung Physical Education Academy)
- The Ghost Comes! A Dance Drama in Four Acts (2005, commissioned by Culture Development Foundation Committee sponsored team in 2005)

=== Interdisciplinary Digital Art Creation ===
- Association of the Raindrop, Transformation and Interaction is an audiovisual interactive presentation that depicts the ecological environment in Taiwan.
- Dimensions is a digital art creation that visualizes religious rites with the means of digital virtual music theater.
- The Ghost Comes is a digital art creation that presents the musical theater performance with the means of digital virtual images;
- The Legend of the Fiber of Taiwanese Legend Series is a musical theater that integrates literature, Taiwanese folk legend, drama, dance, and interactive images.
- Feint-and-Parry Misdirect of the Taiwanese Nursery Rhyme Series, combines with children’s literature, computer music, and interactive images. It is presented as an image-interactive virtual musical theater, including human voices, prepared piano with amplified effect, and percussion quartet.

=== Commercial Music ===
- LP33 Buttermilk Commercials (Advertisement Music)
- Republic of Chocolate Commercial (Video Soundtrack)
- Familyshoes Anniversary Sales Commercial (Advertisement Music)
- EDA Theme Park-Amazing Show Commercial (Theatre Soundtrack)
- 2012 Golden Melody Awards Best Indigenous Album (Soundtrack)
- Mercuries Life Insurance Promotional Video (Soundtrack)
- Gaming Spirit: Video Game Live (Composer and Producer of Online-Game Music Orchestral Soundtrack)

=== Productions ===
- (CD) First Taiwanese Cello Quartet, a CD recorded by Ling-yi, Ouyang (includes Taiwan is Formosa: Six Fu Lao Folk Tunes for Violonello Quartets) Awarded the 17th Golden Melody Award for "The Best Composer for Traditional and Artistic Music."
- (CD, DVD) Hsiahai City God Through Water of Mengjia ("The Best Album Producer and the Best Performance for the 18th Golden Melody Award, 2007)
- (CD) Telltale: Beginning with Formosa (includes Tunes from Various Regions in Taiwan, Six Fu-Lao Folk Tunes for Piano Quartet)
- (Book) Discovering Formosa: Series of Taiwanese Contemporary Composers. A Series of Autobiographies.

=== Digital arts ===
In recent years, Lee has turned his attention to collaborative works employing digital arts. Works that have resulted from this include: Association of Raindrops, Transformation and Interaction, a depiction of ecological systems in Taiwan; Dimensions, a visualisation of religious rites using the techniques of digital virtual music theater; The Ghost Arrives!, a music theater piece using digital images; and Fabric Legend from the Taiwanese Legend Series, a music theater piece encompassing elements of literature, folk tale, drama, dance, and interactive images. Feint-and-Parry Misdirect, from the Taiwanese Nursery Rhyme Series, incorporates elements of children’s literature, computer music, and interactive images in a work of image-interactive virtual musical theater; the piece is scored for voices, prepared piano with amplification effects, and percussion quartet.

== Publications ==
=== Print ===
Lee's autobiography has been published in book form in a collection entitled Discovering Formosa: Taiwanese Contemporary Composers.

Lee regularly publishes scholarly research and presents lectures as well as compositions. The topics usually relate to his creative work, as when the ArtsIT 2009 Conference in Taiwan featured him in a panel discussion of "An Interactive Concert Program Based on Infrared Watermark and Audio Synthesis."

=== Recordings ===
- Audio CD: Rondo Capriccio: NTNU Symphony Orchestra Tour Concerts 2004 (2004). Produced by the National Taiwan Normal University. Includes Narcissus Flower and Dream of Spring at the River.
- Audio CD: Adventures of Four Cellos (2006). Produced by Ling-yi Ouyang. Includes Taiwan is the Formosa: Six Cello Quartets of Fu Lao Folk Tunes. Winner of the 2006 Golden Melody Award.
- Audio CD, Video DVD: The Banga City God (2007). Nominated for 2007 Golden Melody Award for Best Album Producer for Traditional and Art Music.
- Audio CD: Telltale: Beginning with Formosa. Includes Taiwanese Melodies: Six Piano Quartets from Fu Lao Folk Tunes.

== See also ==
- National Taiwan Normal University
