= Peaceful reunification =

- Traditional Chinese: 和平統一
- Simplified Chinese: 和平统一
Transcriptions
Standard Mandarin
- Hanyu Pinyin: Hépíng tǒngyī

Peaceful reunification and one country, two systems
- Traditional Chinese: 和平統一、一國兩制
- Simplified Chinese: 和平统一、一国两制
Transcriptions
Standard Mandarin
- Hanyu Pinyin: Hépíng tǒngyī, yīguóliǎngzhì

Peaceful reunification is a term used by the People's Republic of China (PRC) to refer to the hypothetical unification of Taiwan and mainland China through non-military means rather than armed conflict. It is the united front policy of the Chinese Communist Party and the government of the People's Republic of China to resolve the Taiwan issue since the start of the reform and opening up in 1978. It advocates that the PRC and the Republic of China (ROC) end their hostile state and achieve Chinese unification in a peaceful manner through contact and negotiation. In the context of cross-strait relations, it can be traced back to the public proposal made by Premier Zhou Enlai in May 1955 to strive for the "peaceful" resolution of the Taiwan issue. In contrast, the Chinese unification by force is known as military reunification. The government of the People's Republic of China takes "peaceful reunification and one country, two systems" as its basic policy. However, it does not promise to renounce the use of force and adopts a two-pronged approach of peace and war.

== History ==
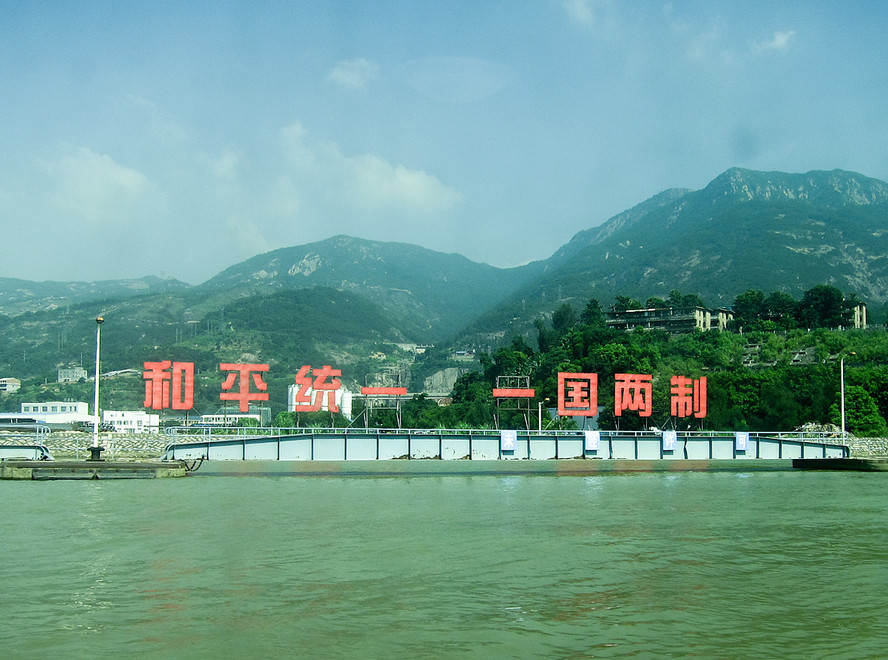
A banner reading "Peaceful Reunification: One Country, Two Systems" located in Mawei District, Fuzhou, China, facing Matsu Island (under the control of the Republic of China).

After 1949, with the establishment of the People's Republic of China and the retreat of the Republic of China to Taiwan, the two sides of the Taiwan Strait were divided. After the outbreak of the Korean War, the United States military defended Taiwan. The PRC attempted to take over Taiwan, but failed. In April 1955, during his visit to Burma, Premier Zhou Enlai said in talks with Burmese prime minister U Nu: "If the US military withdraws, we may liberate Taiwan peacefully. If Chiang Kai-shek accepts, we welcome him to send a representative to Beijing for negotiations". He said "As long as Chiang Kai-shek agrees to China's peace and unification, agrees to the peaceful liberation of Taiwan, and sends a representative to Beijing for negotiations, we believe that even Chiang Kai-shek himself, the Chinese people can forgive him". In May 1955, at the meeting of the Standing Committee of the 1st National People's Congress, Premier Zhou Enlai proposed that the Chinese people have two possible ways to resolve the Taiwan issue, namely, the way of war and the way of peace. He said the Chinese people are willing to strive to resolve the issue peacefully under possible conditions. This was the first time that the leaders of the PRC publicly proposed the idea of peacefully unifying Taiwan.

After 1956, due to the need for political stability in PRC, Mao Zedong, the Chairman of the Chinese Communist Party, and Zhou Enlai, Premier of the State Council, clarified the specific policy of peaceful liberation of Taiwan on different occasions. The key points were: 1. Freedom to visit relatives and friends; 2. No grudges for past mistakes, and rewards for meritorious service; 3. Cooperation between the Kuomintang and the Communist Party, and patriotism as one family; 4. Peaceful liberation, and no mutual sabotage. In 1958, China shelled the islands of Kinmen (Quemoy) and the Matsu Islands, hoping to force Taiwan to surrender through war, launching the Second Taiwan Strait Crisis. With the support of the United States, the Republic of China government held firm on Kinmen. Mao Zedong again instructed that the policy should be changed to peaceful reunification. In 1963, Zhou Enlai summarized the policy toward Taiwan into One Principle and Four Points.

In the 1970s, the domestic and foreign political environment of the PRC changed. On 1 January 1979, Xu Xiangqian, the Minister of National Defense, issued the "Statement of the Ministry of National Defense on Ceasing the Shelling of Kinmen and Other Islands", ending the Kinmen shelling war that lasted for more than 20 years. On the same day, the Standing Committee of the National People’s Congress issued the Message to Compatriots in Taiwan, announcing to the outside world the major policy of the PRC government to peacefully resolve the Taiwan issue and calling on both sides of the Taiwan Strait to negotiate the end of the military standoff. In September 1981, Ye Jianying, the chairman of the Standing Committee of the National People's Congress, proposed "Nine Policy Principles on Peaceful Reunification of Taiwan" – Ye’s Nine Points. In the 1980s, Deng Xiaoping, the paramount leader of the PRC, repeatedly expounded on "one country, two systems". Peaceful reunification and one country, two systems gradually became the basic policy of the PRC government to resolve the Taiwan issue. The Hong Kong-based Wen Wei Po’s editorial related to Deng's Six Conceptions indicated that Deng Xiaoping said "if reunification can be achieved, the national title of the People’s Republic of China can also be changed." However, the People’s Daily’s related report did not mention this proposition.

On 12 October 1992, Jiang Zemin, General Secretary of the CCP Central Committee, pointed out: "We will unswervingly follow the policy of ‘peaceful reunification and one country, two systems’ and actively promote the reunification of the motherland." On 30 January 1995, Jiang Zemin delivered a speech on Taiwan (Jiang's Eight Points), one of which was to conduct negotiations on peaceful reunification across the Taiwan Strait. On 4 March 2005, Hu Jintao, General Secretary of the CCP Central Committee, delivered a speech on Taiwan (Hu's Four Points), the second of which was that efforts to achieve peaceful reunification would never be abandoned.

In the 2010s, the Chinese public and media shifted from supporting the peaceful reunification of Taiwan to the unification of Taiwan by force. On 2 January 2019, Xi Jinping, General Secretary of the CCP Central Committee, delivered the "Xi Five Points" at the 40th anniversary commemoration of the Message to Compatriots in Taiwan. The first to fifth points all mentioned "peaceful reunification", while the third point stated that "not promising to renounce the use of force". In 2020, Tsai Ing-wen, the President of the Republic of China, was re-elected, and cross-strait relations continued to be tense. The academic community of the PRC reached a peak in the argument for the unification of Taiwan by force. On 25 March 2021, Xi Jinping inspected Fujian and instructed that "we should be bold in exploring new paths for the integrated development of the two sides of the Taiwan Strait". Afterwards, "integrated development" became a new term in cross-strait relations. On 1 July 2021, during the celebration of the 100th anniversary of the Chinese Communist Party, Xi Jinping's speech on "promoting the process of peaceful reunification of the motherland" set the tone for the policy toward Taiwan. The argument for the unification of Taiwan by force "almost disappeared" in academic circles, and "opposing independence and promoting reunification" became the main theme of the academic community.

== Basic content ==
The government of the People's Republic of China has several similar explanations of the basic content of the policy of "peaceful reunification and one country, two systems". The main content is that the government of the People's Republic of China and the government of the Republic of China will conduct peaceful negotiations, that is, achieve national reunification peacefully through contact and negotiation.

The premise is that "Both sides should engage in negotiations as soon as possible. Under the premise of one China, all issues can be discussed, including the negotiation methods, participating parties, groups and representatives from all walks of life, as well as all other issues of concern to Taiwan." "Given the current situation across the Taiwan Strait, the Chinese government advocates that before reunification, both sides should actively promote cross-strait economic cooperation and various exchanges in accordance with the principles of mutual respect, complementarity and mutual benefit, and conduct direct postal, trade, and shipping exchanges and two-way exchanges to create conditions for the peaceful reunification of the country." According to the PRC, the solution to the Taiwan issue rests on the Taiwan authorities and, more importantly, on the people of Taiwan.

== Reactions in Taiwan ==
During the 2008 Taiwanese presidential election, Ma Ying-jeou proposed a policy of "no unification, no independence, and no use of force", refusing to commit to promoting cross-strait unification. After leaving office, in 2018, Ma Ying-jeou proposed "not rejecting unification, not supporting Taiwan independence, and not using force."

A 2013 TVBS poll conducted by the polling center indicated that if there were only one option for cross-strait relations, 71% of the public would want Taiwan to become independent, and 18% of the respondents would prefer to unify with mainland China. The pro-unification New Party advocates peaceful reunification across the Taiwan Strait and announced its "One Country, Two Systems Taiwan Plan" on 17 August 2019.
