= One country, two systems (Taiwan plan) =

Chinese Communist Party policy on Taiwan

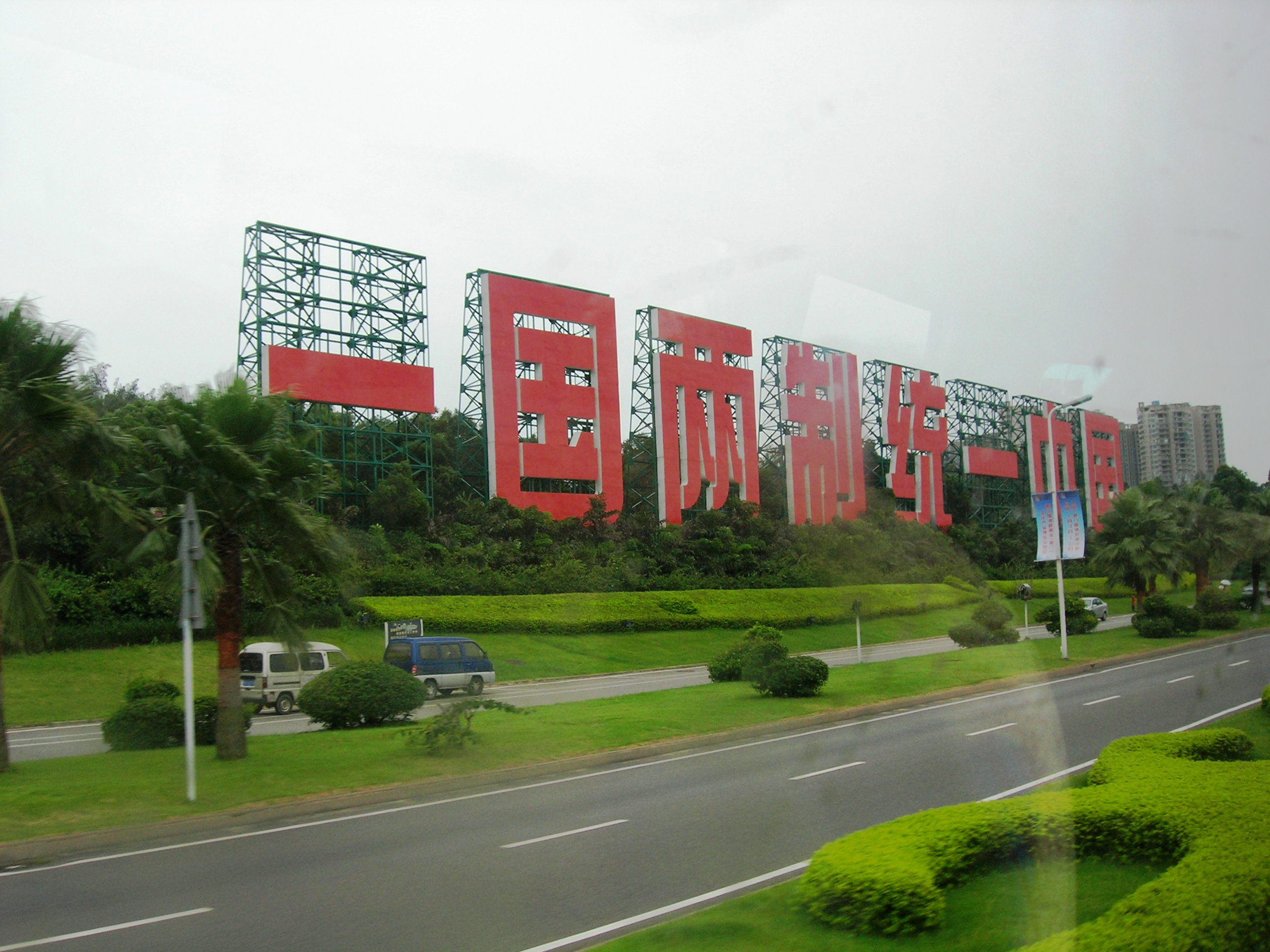
Sgn in Xiamen reading "一国两制统一中国" (Yīguó liǎngzhì tǒngyī Zhōngguó, transl. One country, two systems unites China). The sign faces Republic of China-controlled Kinmen.

The "one country, two systems" Taiwan plan is a proposal of the Chinese Communist Party and the government of the People's Republic of China to achieve Chinese unification under the "one country, two systems" principle. It proposes that Taiwan becomes a Special Administrative Region of the People's Republic of China.

In the 1980s, Chinese paramount leader Deng Xiaoping proposed the "one country, two systems" in order to resolve the Taiwan issue. Although Chinese leaders after Deng did not put forward a specific "one country, two systems" proposal for Taiwan, the Taiwan Affairs Office published a white paper in 1993 entitled The Taiwan Issue and China's Reunification, which described the four basic points of the "peaceful reunification, one country, two systems" policy. The second and third points clearly stated that after Taiwan became a Special Administrative Region, it would implement a capitalist system and have "high degree of autonomy". It would have independent administrative, legislative, judicial, and military powers as well as certain diplomatic powers, and manage its own party, government, military, economy, and finance. The central government would not send troops or personnel to Taiwan. Officials of the Taiwan SAR and people from Taiwan could serve as leaders of central government agencies and manage national affairs.

On 2 January 2019, Xi Jinping, general secretary of the Chinese Communist Party, outlined his "Five Points" during the 40th Anniversary Commemoration of the Message to Compatriots in Taiwan. Regarding the Taiwan issue, he stated that the "1992 Consensus that both sides of the Taiwan Strait belong to one China and should work together to seek national reunification", and extended Deng's Six Conceptions proposed in 1983, proposing to "explore the ‘two systems’ Taiwan solution”, and further, unusually, publicly criticized that “different systems are not an obstacle to reunification, much less an excuse for division”. In August 2022, the State Council issued the white paper The Taiwan Question and China's Reunification in the New Era, which reiterated this.

The Democratic Progressive Party, the Kuomintang and the Taiwan People's Party, have each expressed their opposition to "one country, two systems" proposal. Particular concerns were raised that despite the guarantees of autonomy afforded to a hypothetical Taiwan SAR, Taiwan's existing democratic system, including presidential and legislative elections by full universal suffrage, would be replaced by a principle of "patriots administering Taiwan" where the electoral system would be modified to favor pro-Beijing interest groups and only candidates who are loyal to the Chinese central government would be allowed to run for political office.

== History ==
From 1928 to 1942, the Chinese Communist Party (CCP) maintained that Taiwan was a separate nation. After the Chinese Civil War ended in 1949, the CCP took control of mainland China and established the People's Republic of China. Before the third plenary session of the 11th CCP Central Committee in 1978, the CCP advocated the unification of Taiwan by force. It has been claimed that the system was originally designed for Taiwan in order for it to be unified with the PRC. The PRC's Ministry of Foreign Affairs further claims that Mao Zedong originated the idea of one country, two systems for Taiwan in May 1960. In the 1950s, the CCP Central Committee leaders proposed peaceful unification. Mao Zedong and Premier Zhou Enlai put forward the concept of peaceful unification, but the armed attack on the Republic of China was not stopped until the Ministry of National Defense of the People's Republic of China ordered a halt to the shelling of Kinmen in 1979. In 1963, Zhou proposed the One Principle and Four Points, offered Chiang Kai-shek and the local administration in Taiwan wide-ranking autonomy in local affairs if they accepted Chinese unification. In 1979, Deng Xiaoping, Vice Chairman of the CCP, put forward the concept of "one country, two systems" in the hope of achieving peaceful unification. Since then, peaceful unification and "one country, two systems" have been the basic policy of the People’s Republic of China for resolving the Taiwan issue.

The People’s Republic of China has promulgated four constitutions. The preamble to the 1978 constitution first mentioned that “Taiwan is a sacred part of China’s territory”. The 1982 constitution amended it to "Taiwan is a sacred part of the People’s Republic of China". Since then, it has been regarded as one of the main political beliefs of mainland China. After the third plenary session of the 11th CCP Central Committee in 1978, the CCP put forward the policy of peaceful unification and "one country, two systems", hoping to achieve the unification of China by following this policy. After the handover of Hong Kong and Macau to China, the PRC applied the "one country, two systems" in those two territories, hoping to unify Taiwan using the same approach. It also proposed that after Chinese unification, Taiwan's autonomous government would enjoy greater autonomy than Hong Kong and Macau, and might even possess its own military. The government of the People's Republic of China believes that the two sides of the Taiwan Strait reached the "1992 Consensus" and uses it as the basis for negotiations.

During Jiang Zemin's rule, on 1 September 1993, the Taiwan Affairs Office and the State Council Information Office issued a white paper entitled The Taiwan Question and China's Reunification, which was called the first white paper on the Taiwan issue. "Peaceful reunification and one country, two systems" has four basic points. The second point is that Taiwan's capitalist system is preserved, the current social and economic system remains unchanged, the way of life remains unchanged, and the economic and cultural relations with foreign countries remain unchanged, such as private property, houses, land, enterprise ownership, legal inheritance rights, and investments by overseas Chinese and foreigners are all protected by law. The third point is a high degree of autonomy. After unification, Taiwan would become a Special Administrative Region, distinct from other provinces and regions of China and enjoying a high degree of autonomy. It has administrative management power, legislative power, independent judicial power and final adjudication power in Taiwan; it manages its own party, government, military, economic and financial affairs; it can sign commercial and cultural agreements with foreign countries and enjoy certain foreign affairs powers; it has its own army, and the mainland does not send troops or administrative personnel to Taiwan. Representatives from the SAR government and various sectors of Taiwan can also assume leadership positions in national government agencies and participate in the management of national affairs.

=== Xi Jinping era ===
On the morning of 2 January 2019, a commemorative meeting marking the 40th anniversary of the publication of the Message to Compatriots in Taiwan was held at the Great Hall of the People in Beijing. Xi Jinping, the general secretary of the CCP Central Committee, delivered a speech entitled "Striving Together to Realize the Great Rejuvenation of the Chinese Nation and Promote the Peaceful Reunification of the Motherland" (Xi's Five Points). He set the tone for the 1992 Consensus as "both sides of the Taiwan Strait belong to one China and should work together to seek national reunification", to achieve the goal of "peaceful reunification and one country, two systems", and to deepen cross-strait exchanges and achieve spiritual harmony among compatriots. However, he did not promise to renounce the use of force against Taiwan and reserved the option to take all necessary measures for the unification of Taiwan. He said the peaceful reunification through the "one country, two systems" was "the best approach to realizing national reunification". He said that political system differences "is not an obstacle to reunification" since "one country, two systems" was proposed "precisely to accommodate Taiwan’s actual conditions". He said "after peaceful reunification, Taiwan’s social system and its way of life will be fully respected" and the rights and interests of Taiwan people "will be fully protected" as long as "China’s sovereignty, security, and development interests are ensured". Xi said people on both sides of the Taiwan Strait are all of the same family, and proposed that unification should occur "through consultation and discussion as equals". He proposed that, based on the one China principle, both sides should elect representatives to "engage in extensive and in-depth democratic consultations on cross-strait relations and the future of the nation". Xi proposed development of a one country, two systems formula unique to Taiwan, which he called the "Two Systems" Taiwan Plan ("两制"台湾方案; "Liǎngzhì" Táiwān Fāngàn), for eventual unification. The German Marshall Fund observed in 2024 that Xi's 2019 instruction for PRC researchers to develop a unique "Two Systems" Taiwan Plan was a tacit admission that the principle as applied to Hong Kong and Macau was ill-suited to Taiwan's situation. As of 2024, a detailed framework of the "Two Systems" Taiwan Plan has not been announced.

On 10 August 2022, the Taiwan Affairs Office and the State Council Information Office published the The Taiwan Question and China's Reunification in the New Era, which largely reiterated Xi's points in his 2019 speech, calling for unification under the "one country, two systems" formula. It stressed the imperative of exploring the plan deeper with Taiwan people, which it said would help them "develop a better understanding" of "one country, two systems" and the plan. A May 2025 white paper published by the State Council Information Office outlining their official positions on national sovereignty, China's National Security in the New Era, proclaimed that "Taiwan is a province of China" while also calling for implementation of the PRC's Comprehensive Plan for Resolving the Taiwan Problem in the New Era, which calls for the PRC to adhere to the one country, two systems principle during cross-strait talks with Taiwanese political parties to resolve the "unresolved nature of China's civil war". In October 2025, a series of commentaries under the byline Zhong Tai Wen were published in the Xinhua News Agency, going into detail about what governance could look like after unification. The second article said that "We not only seek reunification in formality, what’s more important is the mental bonding of compatriots on the two sides of the strait". It added that "[We will] implement ‘patriots governing Taiwan’, and a high degree of autonomy,” it said, adding that private property, religious beliefs and legal rights in Taiwan would all be protected". It also said that after unification, a "cross-strait common market" would be established, stating "Taiwanese goods entering the mainland will all enjoy zero tariffs, allowing Taiwanese companies to leverage mainland China’s abundant capital, vast market, comprehensive industrial system, and opportunities brought about by the Belt and Road Initiative to grow and develop". It added that cross-strait industrial chains would be deeply integrated after unification and Taiwan’s large industries, including integrated circuits, precision machinery and biotechnology, would complement mainland China’s strengths and boost competitiveness.

== Reactions in Taiwan ==
In 1982, Taiwanese President Chiang Ching-kuo told a reporter from Newsweek that the CCP was untrustworthy and that any expectation that the CCP would allow Taiwan to retain its separate socio-economic system after unification with the mainland was unrealistic. He said that it was too naive for the CCP to allow the people of the mainland to have freedom while allowing the people of Taiwan to have freedom; it was simply a fantasy that the people of the mainland could not suggest reforms to the CCP at any time while allowing the people of Taiwan to make reform suggestions at any time in the future. In 1984, Chiang Ching-kuo told US President Ronald Reagan’s special envoy Samuel W. Lewis: “The CCP has proposed the idea of one country, two systems. It is impossible for two systems to coexist in one country. The CCP is just using this to lure us, and we will not be fooled... Our Republic of China government’s policy will not change... Our policy towards the CCP is not to yield or compromise, because yielding and compromising will lead to our destruction.” He also proposed “one country, good system” to oppose the PRC's proposal.

During his presidency, Lee Teng-hui proposed a special state-to-state relationship for the “one country, two systems” policy. The Mainland Affairs Council continued to use the “one country, good system” policy and advocated that mainland China should achieve democracy, freedom and equitable distribution of wealth. After the Democratic Progressive Party came to power in 2000, the progress of talks between the two sides of the Taiwan Strait was suspended. At the same time, Chen Shui-bian also proposed the “one country on each side” theory during his presidency. This includes major political parties within Taiwan that favor unification with China, as well as many public opinions that strongly oppose the "one country, two systems" proposal, and each has put forward its own viewpoints in response.

Taiwanese President Tsai Ing-wen stated that the Republic of China did not reach the "1992 Consensus" with the mainland, and Taiwan will never accept "one country, two systems". She also claimed that the 1992 Consensus has been defined by China as "one China, one country, two systems", and criticized Xi Jinping for this. Tsai Ing-wen also said she believes that the Chinese government's pressure on international companies and the People's Liberation Army's military aircraft and warships circling Taiwan will not bring spiritual harmony to the people of Taiwan. The Taiwan Affairs Office issued a press release criticizing Tsai Ing-wen after her speech. It stated that "Tsai Ing-wen, the leader of the DPP authorities, made outrageous remarks, blatantly venting her 'two-state theory' separatist stance, going against the wishes of compatriots on both sides of the Taiwan Strait to improve and develop cross-strait relations, further inciting cross-strait confrontation, and undermining the peaceful development of cross-strait relations." This is the first time since Tsai Ing-wen took office in May 2016 that the Taiwan Affairs Office of the CCP Central Committee has made a characterization of the position of the Tsai Ing-wen administration in Taiwan.

Following the landslide defeat of the KMT in the 2020 Taiwanese presidential election, KMT chairman Johnny Chiang rejected the one country, two systems as a feasible model for Taiwan. In 2021, the KMT platform under newly elected chairman Eric Chu also continued to include the 1992 Consensus while rejecting one country, two systems.

== Comparisons ==
=== Degree of autonomy ===
| Body | Taiwan (Status quo) | Hong Kong | Macau | China (national level) |
| Constitutional Document | Constitution of the Republic of China (as modified by the Additional Articles) | Hong Kong Basic Law (national law of China, subordinate to the Chinese constitution) | Macao Basic Law (national law of China, subordinate to the Chinese constitution) | Constitution of China |
| Final Authority of Constitutional Interpretation & Review | Constitutional Court (part of Judicial Yuan) | NPC Standing Committee | NPC Standing Committee | NPC Standing Committee |
| Supreme leader of State | President of the Republic of China | General Secretary of the Chinese Communist Party | General Secretary of the Chinese Communist Party | General Secretary of the Chinese Communist Party |
| Representative of State / Territory | President of the Republic of China | Chief Executive of Hong Kong | Chief Executive of Macau | President of the People's Republic of China |
| Head of Government / Territory | Premier of the Republic of China | Chief Executive of Hong Kong | Chief Executive of Macau | Premier of the People's Republic of China |
| Executive | Executive Yuan | Executive Council of Hong Kong | Executive Council of Macau | State Council |
| Legislative | Legislative Yuan | Legislative Council | Legislative Assembly | National People's Congress (NPC); NPC Standing Committee |
| Judiciary | Supreme Court of the Republic of China (civil and criminal cases); Supreme Administrative Court of the Republic of China (administrative litigation); Disciplinary Court of the Republic of China (misconduct by state officials) | Hong Kong Court of Final Appeal | Court of Final Appeal of Macau | Supreme People's Court |
| Legal Supervisory or Prosecution | Supreme Prosecutors Office | Department of Justice | Procurator General | Supreme People's Procuratorate |
| Police | National Police Agency (part of Ministry of the Interior) | Hong Kong Police Force (part of Hong Kong Disciplined Services) | Public Security Police Force of Macau; Directorate of Judiciary Police (zh) (parts of Macau Security Force) | People's Police (of Public Security, State Security, Justice, Court and Procuratorate systems); People's Armed Police |
| Military | Republic of China Armed Forces | PLA Hong Kong Garrison | PLA Macau Garrison | People's Liberation Army (PLA); People's Armed Police; Militia |
| Currency | New Taiwan dollar | Hong Kong dollar | Macanese pataca | Renminbi (Chinese yuan) |
| Official Language(s) | None (de jure); de facto Standard Chinese (Guoyu) (traditional) | Chinese (traditional), (simplified), (Cantonese), (Mandarin), English | Chinese (traditional), (simplified), (Cantonese), (Mandarin), Portuguese | Standard Chinese (Putonghua) (simplified) |
| Foreign relations | full rights | limited under "Hong Kong, China" | limited under "Macau, China" | full rights |
| Principal Agency in Foreign Affairs | ROC Ministry of Foreign Affairs | Office of the Commissioner of the Ministry of Foreign Affairs of China in Hong Kong | Office of the Commissioner of the Ministry of Foreign Affairs of China in Macau | PRC Ministry of Foreign Affairs |
| Citizenship | Taiwanese citizenship | Chinese citizenship | Chinese citizenship | Chinese citizenship |
| Proof of Residency | Household registration | Right of abode | Right of abode | Hukou |
| Passport | Taiwanese passport | Hong Kong SAR passport | Macau SAR passport | Chinese passport |
| Passport Issuing Authorities | Ministry of the Interior; Ministry of Foreign Affairs; Representative offices and Diplomatic missions | Immigration Department | Identification Department (zh) | National Immigration Administration; Ministry of Foreign Affairs; Diplomatic missions |
| Customs | Customs Administration (part of ROC Ministry of Finance) | Customs and Excise Department | Macao Customs Service (zh) | General Administration of Customs |

=== Electoral changes ===
| Body | Taiwan | | Hong Kong | | | Macau | |
| Body | In 1983 | After 1992–2005 electoral changes | as a British Colony | as a SAR (1997–2021/2023) | as a SAR (after 2021/2023 electoral changes) | as a Portuguese Colony | as a SAR |
| Constitutional Document | Constitution of the Republic of China | Constitution of the Republic of China (as modified by the Additional Articles) | Hong Kong Letters Patent and Hong Kong Royal Instructions (statutory instruments of the UK, issued under the Royal preorgative) | Hong Kong Basic Law (national law of China, subordinate to the Chinese constitution) | | Organic Statute of Macau (organic law of Portugal, subordinate to the Portuguese constitution) | Macao Basic Law (national law of China, subordinate to the Chinese constitution) |
| Constitutional amendment authority | By the National Assembly, dominated by KMT members elected in Mainland China in 1947–48 | By referendum of the Taiwan area electorate | By the Monarch of the United Kingdom on the advice of HM Government | By the National People's Congress based on proposals from the Legislative Council of Hong Kong | | By the Assembly of the Republic of Portugal based on proposals from the Legislative Assembly of Macau | By the National People's Congress based on proposals from the Legislative Assembly of Macau |
| Chief Executive of State / Territory | President of the Republic of China | | Governor of Hong Kong | Chief Executive of Hong Kong | | Governor of Macau | Chief Executive of Macau |
| Chief executive selection authority | Indirect elections by the National Assembly (Republic of China), dominated by KMT members elected in Mainland China in 1947–48 | Direct elections by the Taiwan area electorate | By the Monarch of the United Kingdom on the advice of HM Government | Indirect elections by the Election Committee, dominated by pro-Beijing business interests | | By the President of Portugal based on consultations with the Legislative Assembly of Macau and representatives of Macanese social interests | Indirect elections by the Election Committee, dominated by pro-Beijing business interests |
| Legislative | Tricameralism: Control Yuan (upper house), Legislative Yuan (lower house), National Assembly (constituent assembly/electoral college) | Legislative Yuan | Legislative Council | | | Legislative Assembly | |
| Legislative elections | Control Yuan: de jure, fully indirectly elected by the Provincial Councils. The composition was de facto dominated by KMT members elected in Mainland China in 1947–48, with a small share of supplementary members elected by the Taiwan area electorate. | Fully elected in direct elections by the Taiwan area electorate | Before 1985: Fully appointed by the Governor. | Four-sevenths elected directly by the Hong Kong electorate, and three-sevenths elected indirectly by business interests | Two-ninths elected directly by the Hong Kong electorate, one-third elected indirectly by business interests, and four-ninths elected indirectly by the Election Committee dominated by pro-Beijing business interests | One-third elected directly by the Macau electorate, one-third elected indirectly by business interests, and one-third appointed by the Governor. | Two-fifths elected directly by the Macau electorate, two-fifths elected indirectly by business interests, and one-fifth appointed by the Chief Executive. |
| Legislative elections | Legislative Yuan: de jure, fully directly elected by the ROC electorate. The composition was de facto dominated by KMT members elected in Mainland China in 1947–48, with a small share of supplementary members elected by the Taiwan area electorate. | Fully elected in direct elections by the Taiwan area electorate | 1985 and 1988: One-fourth elected indirectly by local councils, one-third elected indirectly by business interests, and one-half appointed by the Governor. | Four-sevenths elected directly by the Hong Kong electorate, and three-sevenths elected indirectly by business interests | Two-ninths elected directly by the Hong Kong electorate, one-third elected indirectly by business interests, and four-ninths elected indirectly by the Election Committee dominated by pro-Beijing business interests | One-third elected directly by the Macau electorate, one-third elected indirectly by business interests, and one-third appointed by the Governor. | Two-fifths elected directly by the Macau electorate, two-fifths elected indirectly by business interests, and one-fifth appointed by the Chief Executive. |
| Legislative elections | National Assembly: de jure, fully directly elected by the ROC electorate. The composition was de facto dominated by KMT members elected in Mainland China in 1947–48, with a small share of supplementary members elected by the Taiwan area electorate. | Fully elected in direct elections by the Taiwan area electorate | 1991: One-third elected directly by the Hong Kong electorate, one-third elected indirectly by business interests, and one-third appointed by the Governor. | Four-sevenths elected directly by the Hong Kong electorate, and three-sevenths elected indirectly by business interests | Two-ninths elected directly by the Hong Kong electorate, one-third elected indirectly by business interests, and four-ninths elected indirectly by the Election Committee dominated by pro-Beijing business interests | One-third elected directly by the Macau electorate, one-third elected indirectly by business interests, and one-third appointed by the Governor. | Two-fifths elected directly by the Macau electorate, two-fifths elected indirectly by business interests, and one-fifth appointed by the Chief Executive. |
| Legislative elections | National Assembly: de jure, fully directly elected by the ROC electorate. The composition was de facto dominated by KMT members elected in Mainland China in 1947–48, with a small share of supplementary members elected by the Taiwan area electorate. | Fully elected in direct elections by the Taiwan area electorate | 1995: Fully elected in direct elections by the Hong Kong electorate. | Four-sevenths elected directly by the Hong Kong electorate, and three-sevenths elected indirectly by business interests | Two-ninths elected directly by the Hong Kong electorate, one-third elected indirectly by business interests, and four-ninths elected indirectly by the Election Committee dominated by pro-Beijing business interests | One-third elected directly by the Macau electorate, one-third elected indirectly by business interests, and one-third appointed by the Governor. | Two-fifths elected directly by the Macau electorate, two-fifths elected indirectly by business interests, and one-fifth appointed by the Chief Executive. |
| Local Elections | Provincial level: Direct elections for the Taiwan Provincial Council. However, instead of a directly elected Governor, the Taiwan Provincial Government was headed by a Chairman appointed by the central government. | The ROC's provinces have been streamlined; their functions are now exercised by the corresponding national authorities, i.e. the Legislative and Executive Yuans. | The Urban Council and Regional Council were half-appointed and half-elected, with the exception of the last councils elected in 1995, which were fully-elected bodies. | The Urban Council and Regional Council have been abolished; their functions are now exercised by the Food and Environmental Hygiene Department and the Leisure and Cultural Services Department, which are departments of the SAR-wide Executive Council. | | Macau was divided into two municipalities, Macau and Ilhas, which were administered according to the Portuguese local government system of a Câmara municipal and an Assembleia Municipal, both fully elected directly by the electorate. | The municipalities of Macau have been abolished; their functions are now exercised by the Municipal Affairs Bureau, which is a department of the SAR-wide Executive Council. |
| Local Elections | County level: Direct elections for County Magistrates as well as all members of the County Councils. | | The District boards were half-appointed and half-elected, with the exception of the last boards elected in 1995, which were fully-elected bodies. | The District councils were initially four-fifths elected directly by the electorate and one-fifth appointed by the Chief Executive; beginning in 2015, they once again became fully-elected bodies. | The District councils are one-fifth elected directly by the electorate, two-fifths indirectly elected by government-appointed district committees, and two-fifths appointed by the Chief Executive. | Macau was divided into two municipalities, Macau and Ilhas, which were administered according to the Portuguese local government system of a Câmara municipal and an Assembleia Municipal, both fully elected directly by the electorate. | The municipalities of Macau have been abolished; their functions are now exercised by the Municipal Affairs Bureau, which is a department of the SAR-wide Executive Council. |
| Party System | Dominant-party system under the Kuomintang, with the opposition Tangwai movement marginalized | Competitive multi-party system between the Pan-Blue Coalition which favors closer relations with China, and the Pan-Green Coalition which favors Taiwanese nationalism | Competitive multi-party system, first between Pro-PRC leftists and Pro-ROC rightists, later between the Pro-Beijing camp and the Pro-democracy camp | Competitive multi-party system between the Pro-Beijing camp and United front in Hong Kong, closely linked with the PRC central government and business interests, and the Pro-democracy camp supported by civil society organizations. | Dominant-party system under the Pro-Beijing camp and United front in Hong Kong, with the Pro-democracy camp marginalized | Dominant-party system under the Pro-Beijing camp, closely linked with the PRC central government and business interests, with the Pro-democracy camp marginalized | |

== Public opinion ==
According to polls conducted by Taiwan's Mainland Affairs Council in 2025, over 80 percent of Taiwan reject "one country, two systems". According to a My Formosa poll in 2026, when asked whether they would accept "one country, two systems" and Taiwan becoming "a province or special administrative region of the People's Republic of China, like Hong Kong and Macau" if "there will be no war between the two sides", 22.4 percent of Taiwan said they would be accepting while 68.2 percent said they would not be accepting (including 53.4 percent who said it would be very unacceptable).
