= Never promise to renounce the use of force =

Chinese Communist Party slogan

- Simplified Chinese: 不承诺放弃使用武力
Transcriptions
Standard Mandarin
- Hanyu Pinyin: Bù chéngnuò fàngqì shǐyòng wǔlì

"Never promise to renounce the use of force" is a political slogan of the Chinese Communist Party (CCP) concerning its policy of unifying Taiwan with the People's Republic of China (PRC). It means that the PRC reserves the right to use military force in achieving unification.

Since the 1980s, the government of the PRC and the ruling CCP have adopted "peaceful reunification" and "one country, two systems" as their policy stance regarding the political status of Taiwan. At the same time, they have insisted on never renouncing the use of force to unify Taiwan.

== History ==
In the 1980s, Chinese leader Deng Xiaoping proposed the "one country, two systems" approach to solving the Taiwan issue. Since then, "peaceful reunification and one country, two systems" has been the basic policy of the Government of the People's Republic of China. At the same time, Deng pointed out that the Government of the People's Republic of China could not promise not to use force to solve the Taiwan issue, nor could it easily use force. In September 1993, the Government of the People's Republic of China issued its first White Paper on the Taiwan Question. The third paragraph of "Basic Policy of the Chinese Government on Solving the Taiwan Issue mentioned that "peaceful reunification is the established policy of the Chinese government. However, every sovereign state has the right to take all means it deems necessary, including military means, to safeguard its sovereignty and territorial integrity. The Chinese government is under no obligation to make any commitment to any foreign country or person seeking to split China on the way it handles its internal affairs."

On January 30, 1995, Jiang Zemin, then General Secretary of the CCP Central Committee, delivered a speech, namely Jiang's Eight Points. The fourth point was: "We will strive to achieve peaceful reunification. Chinese people should not fight against Chinese people. We do not promise to renounce the use of force. This is not directed against our compatriots in Taiwan, but against foreign forces interfering in China's reunification and seeking 'Taiwan independence'". In March 2000, Premier Zhu Rongji made the same statement: "We have never promised to renounce the use of force, but it is not directed against the people of Taiwan" but "against foreign interference and separatist forces on the island of Taiwan seeking "Taiwan independence"." In 2001, Jiang Zemin delivered a speech at the celebration of the 80th anniversary of the founding of the Chinese Communist Party, stating that "we have the greatest sincerity in striving to achieve peaceful reunification, but we cannot promise to renounce the use of force."

=== Anti-Secession Law ===
The Anti-Secession Law is a law of the People's Republic of China, passed by the 3rd Session of the 10th National People's Congress. It was ratified on March 14, 2005, and went into effect immediately. Although the law, at ten articles, is relatively short, Article 8 formalized the long-standing policy of the PRC to use military means against Taiwan independence in the event peaceful means become impossible.

=== Xi Jinping ===
During his tenure as General Secretary of the CCP Central Committee, Xi Jinping repeatedly reiterated that he would never renounce the use of force. The third of Xi's Five Points, published in 2019, states, "We do not renounce the use of force and reserve the option of taking all necessary measures. This is aimed at external interference and a very small number of 'Taiwan independence' separatists and their separatist activities, and is not aimed at our compatriots in Taiwan." On October 16, 2022, Xi Jinping made the same statement during his report at the opening session of the 20th CCP National Congress. Officials of the People's Republic of China have also used this statement.

==== 2024 guidelines ====
In 2024, the PRC issued the Guidelines on Imposing Criminal Punishments on Diehard "Taiwan independence" Separatists for Conducting or Inciting Secession, based partially on the Anti-Secession Law, stating that supporters of Taiwanese independence, regardless of their location, could be tried in absentia and sentenced to death by Chinese courts.

== Reactions ==
=== People's Republic of China ===
Some researchers regard it as the sovereign right of the People's Republic of China a deterrent policy in the Taiwan policy. They believe that the reason why the government of the Republic of China and "the 'Taiwan independence' forces dare not openly and formally declare independence" is due to the influence of this deterrent.

=== Taiwan ===
The Mainland Affairs Council held a press conference on October 27 and released its regular poll from October 19 to 23. In this poll, regarding Xi Jinping's Taiwan-related propositions in his October 16 report, 85.6% of respondents strongly opposed his statement that he would not renounce the use of force, and 91.6% of respondents disagreed with the CCP's use of force to threaten Taiwan.
