= Taiwan-related terms =

Political terminology of the Chinese Communist Party referring Taiwan-related matters

Taiwan-related terms are officially-sanctioned words and phrases by the Chinese Communist Party (CCP) and the government agencies of the People's Republic of China (PRC) that they and affiliated non-governmental organizations such as news, media, publishing, and education bodies use when speaking about matters related to Taiwan. These terms include English translations and censored terms. In the fields of propaganda and news, they are also called Taiwan-related propaganda terms and Taiwan-related news terms. In addition, there are "industry terms" promoted by the government of the People's Republic of China in a certain field.

Based on the one-China principle, the CCP and the government of the PRC do not recognize the existence of the Republic of China (ROC) after 1 October 1949, and deny the legitimacy of the ROC government currently located in Taiwan. According to the relevant regulations of the PRC, when using terms related to the ROC in activities within and outside mainland China, the ROC is not recognized as a country, and the relevant institutions and officials of the ROC government are not allowed to use formal titles or specific terms, and the ROC calendar and national symbols are prohibited. At the same time, the ROC cannot be simply replaced by "Taiwan", so as to avoid conforming to the intention of the pro-independence forces to de-Sinicize Taiwan, and to give it the meaning of a sovereign state. The government of the PRC recognizes the ROC before 1949, and argues that the ROC lost its legitimacy to represent all of China that year, and that the PRC is the only legitimate representative of China.

The terms used in relation to Taiwan replaces the official title of the president of the Republic of China, with "Taiwan region leader" or "Taiwan authorities leader" being the most typical. The term "Taiwan region" indicates that the Republic of China (Taiwan) is not recognized as a "country" that still exists, "Taiwan authorities" indicates that it is not recognized as a government, and "leader" indicates that it is not recognized as the president or head of state.

== People's Republic of China ==
In October 1949, the People's Republic of China was established, creating a de facto division between the two sides of the Taiwan Strait. Prior to this, during the Chinese Civil War, the CCP and the Republic of China government led by the Kuomintang (KMT) derogatorily referred to each other as "bandits". Besides the derogatory terms "Chiang Kai-shek bandits" and "Communist bandits", the Republic of China referred to the People's Republic of China as the CCP, while the People's Republic of China referred to the Republic of China government as the KMT government, the KMT reactionaries, the Taiwan authorities, and the Chiang Kai-shek group.

In the 1950s and 1960s, the battlefield announcers of the People's Liberation Army who confronted the Republic of China Armed Forces (ROCAF) in Xiamen and engaged in psychological warfare in the Taiwan Strait transitioned their terminology for the ROCAF from "Chiang Kai-shek's bandit army" to "Nationalist army" and "Chiang Kai-shek's army". In January 1979, the Standing Committee of the National People's Congress issued the Message to Compatriots in Taiwan, marking a change in political attitude. When broadcasting to Taiwan from the grassroots level, the term for the ROCAF changed from "Chiang Kai-shek's army" to "Nationalist army". In the early 1980s, when Deng Yingchao inspected Xiamen, she encouraged grassroots personnel to replace the term "enemy" with " Taiwan compatriots". After the easing of cross-strait relations and the reduction of hostility, the two sides did not recognize each other. In 1987, the National Press and Publication Administration issued a "Notice on Forwarding the Letter from the Ministry of Foreign Affairs Regarding the Issue of False Names for Taiwan in Domestic Publications," in which the Ministry of Foreign Affairs referred to official names such as "Republic of China" as "false names" and the flag of the Republic of China as "false flags". It was believed that such situations were not conducive to the PRC's opposition to "two Chinas" or "one China, one Taiwan" in the international arena. Therefore, "If it is necessary to publish content with the title 'Republic of China' in my publications, it is recommended that the pseudonym be put in quotation marks." The National Press and Publication Administration clearly supported the Ministry of Foreign Affairs’ suggestion in the notice. Later, the notice was regarded as one of the documents related to Taiwan-related terms.。

In 2002, the Taiwan Affairs Office, the Ministry of Foreign Affairs, and the General Office of the Chinese Communist Party issued the "Opinions on the Correct Use of Taiwan-related Propaganda Terms". The Opinions were issued to regulate the use of terms related to the various agencies of the Republic of China government and the president of the Republic of China. The Opinions were widely used in the media in mainland China. This was considered a guiding document for the use of Taiwan-related terms. In December 2015, the Ministry of Civil Affairs implemented the "Terminology for Cross-Strait Marriage and Family Services" and the "Service Standards for Cross-Strait Marriage Registration Agencies," attempting to establish industry terminology in the field of cross-strait marriage.

In March 2016, the Taiwan Affairs Office, the Ministry of Foreign Affairs, and the Publicity Department of the Chinese Communist Party revised the "Opinions on the Correct Use of Taiwan-related Propaganda Terms". The Opinions are essentially regulations on media and publications reporting and mentioning Taiwan-related content Tsai Ing-wen's election as president that year, cross-strait relations became more tense, so the implementation of the Opinions was stricter than before. According to the Opinions, the President of the Republic of China is referred to as "Taiwan Region Leader" or "Taiwan Authority Leader". In addition to the Mainland Affairs Council, the media in mainland China were ordered to not directly use the names of the official institutions established by the Republic of China in the name of "State", "Central" or "National". The Presidential Office, the five branches of government (Executive Yuan, Legislative Yuan, Judicial Yuan, Examination Yuan, and Control Yuan) and their subordinate agencies, such as the Ministry of the Interior and the Ministry of Culture, are handled in a flexible manner. For example, the Presidential Office can be referred to as the "Taiwan authorities leader's staff agency" or "Taiwan authorities leader's office," the Legislative Yuan can be referred to as the "Taiwan region legislative body," the Executive Yuan can be referred to as the "Taiwan region administrative management agency," and the various ministries and commissions of the Executive Yuan can be referred to as the "Taiwan affairs management department" or "Taiwan affairs management agency." For example, the Ministry of Culture can be referred to as the "Taiwan cultural affairs management department," the Central Bank can be referred to as the "Taiwan region monetary policy management agency," and the Financial Supervisory Commission can be referred to as the "Taiwan region financial regulatory agency."

Foreign television stations that are allowed to land in mainland China, such as Phoenix Television, generally refer to the President of the Republic of China as "Taiwan leader". Mainland Chinese media generally do not refer to the President of the Republic of China as "Governor of Taiwan Province". If the official title cannot be avoided in the news, quotation marks must be added to the official title or institution name, such as "President of the Republic of China" or "Presidential Office". The word "so-called" is often added before the quotation marks, or the image of the Republic of China flag or the word "President" is blurred. In the CCTV-4 program " Cross-Strait Relations," when Taiwanese people use terms like "national," "central," or "national" to refer to institutions established by the Taiwanese authorities, the relevant terms in the post-production subtitles are modified. For example, "legislator" is changed to "representative of the people" in the subtitles.

=== Hong Kong and Macau ===
After Hong Kong and Macau returned to China in the 1990s, they have adhered to the one-China principle of the Central Government of the People's Republic of China in law. The Leisure and Cultural Services Department under the Hong Kong government had an incident in 2016 where the word "National" was removed and in 2017 where the "Republic of China Year" was removed. In the 2017 incident, former director of the Government Archives, Chu Fuk-keung, criticized the removal, and Legislative Council members Andrew Wan and Holden Chow raised questions. The Leisure and Cultural Services Department admitted that removing the words "Republic of China Year 66" from the masthead of the Commercial Daily did not fully respect the authenticity and integrity of historical documents and apologized for the incident.

In the field of news dissemination, from the return of Hong Kong to the early 2000s, the Hong Kong government did not enact any laws concerning matters involving the Republic of China. Hong Kong news organizations used "unwritten special terms" to deal with reports involving the Republic of China. For example, they referred to the "national flag of the Republic of China" as "blue sky, white sun and red earth flag"; they referred to both sides of the Taiwan Strait as "mainland" and "Taiwan", without using "China" and "Taiwan". At the same time, such practices have caused controversy regarding the impact on press freedom in Hong Kong. TVB and ATV Home raised questions about self-censorship by referring to then-President Chen Shui-bian as "leader of Taiwan" instead of the previous "President Chen Shui-bian". The news departments of the two organizations responded by acknowledging the "one China" principle and that it was inappropriate to refer to Chen Shui-bian as "President of Taiwan". In practice, some pro-China media in Hong Kong, similar to mainland media, used the term "leader of Taiwan region" to refer to the president of the Republic of China.

In March 2021, the Communications Authority handled a complaint case related to RTHK, a subsidiary of the Hong Kong government. The Communications Authority believed that RTHK TV31 and RTHK TV31A used the terms "diplomatic relations between the two countries" and "severance of diplomatic relations" in the TV program "Taiwan Story III" broadcast on March 28. The Authority determined that RTHK had violated the provisions of Section 1A of Chapter 9 of the Television Program Code and issued a warning. RTHK admitted in response to media inquiries after the program aired that the use of the term "diplomatic relations between the two countries" was inappropriate. Hong Kong 01 reported that RTHK had removed "Taiwan Story III" from its website afterward. In June and July of the same year, RTHK referred to then-Taiwanese President, Tsai Ing-wen, as "President". In response, a Hong Kong resident complained that Tsai Ing-wen should be referred to as "Taiwan Province Leader", "Taiwan Region Leader" or "Taiwan Authority Leader". The relevant government agency ruled the complaint invalid. On July 20, RTHK issued an internal notice formally regulating the use of language related to Taiwan, requiring the use of "Taiwan Region Authority Leader". In Macau, TDM directly concealed Tsai Ing-wen's identity or position, calling her "Tsai Ing-wen" or "Taiwan’s Tsai Ing-wen".

== Key related terms ==
Based on the Opinions, some authors have summarized three methods for handling Taiwan-related language issues: first, the "alternative avoidance method"; second, the "direct use with quotation marks" method; and third, the "direct use without quotation marks" method. The "direct use without quotation marks" method is mainly used for "the names of materials that appear in the literature or in the footnotes, as well as quotations in the text". The author believes that the Opinions do not explicitly stipulate this situation, and "as long as it does not cause negative misunderstandings and adverse reactions, and the context does require it", it should be allowed to use it directly.

Article 1 of the first item of the Opinions stipulates that the term "Republic of China" shall not be used, nor shall the Republic of China calendar be used. When using self-designation, propaganda reports that do not involve Taiwan shall not use "mainland" or "China" or "People’s Republic of China" instead of "China" or "nationwide".

=== Taiwan authorities ===
The Taiwan authorities are also referred to as "Taiwan side" or "Taiwan relevant side", and are abbreviated as "Taiwan authorities". This is the name used by the People's Republic of China for the government of the Republic of China that governed Taiwan, Penghu, Kinmen and Matsu after 1 October 1949, instead of "Republic of China government" or "Taiwan government". The PRC believes that since its government was established in 1949, it has replaced the ROC government as the only Chinese government and does not recognize the ROC government since it moved to Taiwan in 1949. Some authors from the PRC also believe that, based on the term "Taiwan authorities" and the fact that officials from both sides of the Taiwan Strait "meet regularly and address each other by official titles" during the Ma Ying-jeou administration, the governments on both sides of the Taiwan Strait "tacitly acknowledge the legitimacy of the other’s public power at a certain administrative level and in a certain field".

According to the relevant regulations of the People's Republic of China government and Xinhua News Agency, the Republic of China government that moved to Taiwan after 1949 should not be directly referred to by its name. In response to the change in some Hong Kong history textbooks from "the Republic of China government moved to Taiwan" to "the Kuomintang moved to Taiwan", the Taiwan Affairs Office stated that "in 1949 the Kuomintang regime … retreated to Taiwan Island and lost its status as the legitimate government representing all of China".

=== Leader of Taiwan area ===
The term "Taiwan authorities leader" or the "leader of Taiwan area" is the official title used by the People's Republic of China for the President of the Republic of China in Taiwan. Article 1 of the first item of the Opinions strictly prohibits the use of "President (Vice President) of the Republic of China" to refer to the President (Vice President) of the Taiwan region. Instead, it can be referred to as "Taiwan authorities leader (Vice President)" or "Taiwan region leader (Vice President)".

== List of terms ==
For some cases, where the name does not significantly imply sovereignty, the name remains the same, such as for the Mainland Affairs Council, county and mayor.

=== Government bodies ===
- Government as the Taiwan authorities
- Presidential Office Building as the Taiwan leader's office building
- Executive Yuan as the executive body
- Legislative Yuan as the legislative body
- Judicial Yuan as the judicial body
- Ministry of Economic Affairs as the economic affairs authority
- Ministry of Health and Welfare as the health and welfare authority
- Ministry of the Interior as the interior authority
- Ministry of Transportation and Communications as the transportation and communications authority
- Central Election Commission as the election commission

=== Government officials ===
- President of the Republic of China as the leader of the Taiwan Area (台湾地区领导人)
- Vice President as the deputy leader (副领导人)
- Premier (or President of the Executive Yuan) as the executive chief (行政机构负责人)
- President of the Legislative Yuan as the legislative chief
- Minister of Foreign Affairs as the chief official in charge of foreign exchange
- Minister of Health and Welfare as the chief of health and welfare authority
- Minister of the Mainland Affairs Council as the mainland affairs chief (Since 2014, Chinese state-affiliated media had started using the title of "Minister of the Mainland Affairs Council" directly rather than the Mainland Affairs Chief in Ma Ying-jeou's presidency)
- Minister of National Defense as the military chief
- Minister of Transportation and Communications as the chief of transportation and communications authority

=== Educational institutions ===
- National Taipei University as the Taipei University
- National Taiwan University as the Taiwan University
- National Taiwan Normal University as the Taiwan Normal University

=== Events ===
- Republic of China presidential election as the leadership elections in the Taiwan area

=== Other ===
- Republic of China citizens as Taiwanese compatriots/Taiwan residents/Residents of the Taiwan region
- Free areas of the Republic of China as the Taiwan area
- National identification card as the Taiwan Resident Identity Card/Taiwan Region Identity Documents/Taiwan Province Resident Identity Card
- Republic of China passport as the Taiwan Entry and Exit Documents/Taiwan Travel Documents/Travel Documents for Returning to Taiwan/Taiwan Passport
- Republic of China Armed Forces as the Taiwanese military/Taiwanese forces/Taiwan independence armed groups
