= Hu's Four Points =

Chinese policy in 2005

Hu's Four Points refers to the four "no" points on Taiwan affairs issued by Hu Jintao, General Secretary of the Chinese Communist Party, on March 4, 2005, following Jiang's Eight Points issued by Jiang Zemin.

== Content ==
The four points include:

- First, we must never waver in our adherence to the one-China principle;
- Second, we will never give up our efforts to achieve peaceful reunification;
- Third, we will never change our policy of placing our hopes on the people of Taiwan;
- Fourth, we will never compromise in opposing Taiwan independence activities.

== Analysis ==
Some people believe that the content of the Four Nevers does not go beyond the past Taiwan policy of the People's Republic of China, and does not change the mainland China 's consistent tough stance on Taiwan. However, it is also seen as Hu Jintao finally being able to "legitimately" put forward a programmatic speech representing the new government's Taiwan policy as the leader of the party and the country, and to ease Taiwan's backlash against the Anti-Secession Law.

On December 31, 2008, CCP General Secretary Hu Jintao issued the Hu's Six Points, which specifically elaborated his Taiwan policy concepts. It replaced the Hu's Four Points proposed during the Democratic Progressive Party's administration and became the highest program of the Chinese Communist Party's Taiwan policy after Ma Ying- jeou came to power and cross-strait relations entered a stage of peaceful development.
