= Deng's Six Conceptions =

Six principles for resolving the Taiwan issue proposed by Deng Xiaoping

Deng's Six Conceptions (Chinese: 邓六条; pinyin: Dèng Liùtiáo) are six principles for resolving the Taiwan issue, proposed by Deng Xiaoping, then chairman of the Central Advisory Commission, during a meeting with Professor Yang Liyu of Seton Hall University in New Jersey, United States, on 26 June 1983. The main points of this conversation are included in the third volume of Selected Works of Deng Xiaoping, entitled "Concepts on the Peaceful Reunification of Mainland China and Taiwan". Its principles are broadly similar to the "one country, two systems" concept.

Between 1979 and 1982, Yang Liyu visited mainland China 11 times. In March 1983, at the annual meeting of the Association for Asian Studies in San Francisco, Yang Liyu listed "The Prospects of China's Unification" as a discussion topic. At the meeting, Qiu Hongda, regarded as President Chiang Ching-kuo's representative, put forward conditions for peace talks that were considered to represent the Republic of China. Deng Xiaoping stated that there was a deep misunderstanding and expressed a willingness to clarify it in person. During the talks on 26 June, Deng Xiaoping was accompanied by several senior officials: Yang Shangkun, a member of the Politburo of the Chinese Communist Party and Vice Chairman and Secretary-General of the Central Military Commission with responsibility for Taiwan affairs; Deng Liqun, Member of the CCP Central Committee Secretariat and Head of the Central Propaganda Department; Wang Feng, Deputy Head of the Central Leading Group for Taiwan Affairs; and Ma Hong, President of the Chinese Academy of Social Sciences.

In 1987, Chiang Ching-kuo's "One Country, Good System" was described as a response to "One Country, Two Systems" in 1983.

== Content ==
The following are the main points of Deng Xiaoping's conversation with Yang Liyu, originally published in the People's Daily on 26 June 1983:

The core of the issue is the reunification of the motherland. Peaceful reunification has become the common language of the KMT and the CPC. But it is not that I will eat you, nor that you will eat me. We hope that the KMT and the CPC will jointly achieve national reunification and that everyone will contribute to the Chinese nation.

We do not agree with the idea of "complete autonomy" for Taiwan. Autonomy cannot be without limits, and if it has limits, it cannot be "complete". "Complete autonomy" means "two Chinas", not one China. The systems may be different, but the only country that can represent China in the international community is the People's Republic of China. We recognize that the local government of Taiwan can have its own set of domestic policies. As a special administrative region, although Taiwan is a regional government, it is different from the local governments of other provinces, cities and even autonomous regions. It can have certain powers that other provinces, cities and autonomous regions do not have and are unique to itself, provided that it does not harm the interests of a unified country.

After the reunification of the motherland, the Taiwan Special Administrative Region can have its own independence and can implement a different system from the mainland. The judiciary is independent, and the final adjudication does not need to go to Beijing. Taiwan can also have its own army, but it cannot pose a threat to the mainland. The mainland will not send people to Taiwan, not only the military but also administrative personnel. Taiwan's party, government, military and other systems will be managed by Taiwan itself. The central government will also reserve quotas for Taiwan.

Peaceful reunification does not mean that the mainland will swallow up Taiwan, and of course it cannot mean that Taiwan will swallow up the mainland. The so-called "Three Principles of the People to unify China" is unrealistic.

To achieve unification, there must be an appropriate method, so we suggest holding equal talks between the two parties and implementing the third cooperation, rather than central and local negotiations. After the two sides reach an agreement, they can officially announce it. But foreign countries must not be allowed to interfere, as that would only mean that China is not yet independent, which would lead to endless troubles.

We hope that the Taiwan side will carefully study the contents of the nine-point policy guidelines proposed by Ye Jianying in September 1981 and the opening speech delivered by Deng Yingchao at the first session of the Sixth CPPCC in June 1983 to eliminate misunderstandings.

You did a very good thing by hosting the "Prospects for China's Reunification" symposium in San Francisco, the United States, in March this year.

We want to complete the unification cause that our predecessors have not completed. If the KMT and the CPC can accomplish this together, the history of Chiang Kai-shek and his son will be better written. Of course, it takes some time to achieve peaceful reunification. If you say there is no rush, that is a lie. We, as older people, always hope to achieve it as soon as possible. We need to have more contacts and enhance understanding. We can send people to Taiwan at any time, and we can just observe without talking. We also welcome them to send people to ensure safety and confidentiality. We keep our words and do not play tricks.

We have achieved stability and unity. The policy of peacefully reunifying the motherland was formulated after the Third Plenary Session of the Eleventh Central Committee of our Party. The relevant policies have been gradually improved and we will stick to them.

Sino-US relations have improved slightly recently, but the US authorities have never given up on the "two Chinas" or "one and a half Chinas". The US boasts about its system so much, but it says one thing during the presidential campaign, one thing when it just took office, one thing during the midterm elections, and another thing when the next election is approaching. The US also says that our policies are unstable, but compared with the US, our policies are much more stable.

== Change of the country's name ==
Since the publication of Deng Xiaoping's Six Points in the People's Daily on 26 June 1983, public figures on both sides of the Taiwan Strait, including former Kuomintang chairwoman Hung Hsiu-chu, as well as members of the Taiwanese public, have said that during the Deng Xiaoping era, the PRC negotiated the national flag, national name, and national anthem with the other side. On 29 October 2001, General Secretary Jiang Zemin met with a delegation from the China Unification Alliance in Zhongnanhai, Beijing.

Deng Xiaoping's view that the name of the People's Republic of China could be changed for the sake of unification was not included in Deng's Six Points, published in the People's Daily on 26 June 1983. However, the view that "under the 'one China' principle, everything can be discussed" was generally accepted and maintained by top leaders. In November 2002, Jiang Zemin, general secretary of the CCP Central Committee, reiterated in his report at the 16th CCP National Congress that "under the 'one China' principle, everything can be discussed", which was summarized as "three things that can be discussed". After that, these positions became part of the established policy framework.

In December 2012, a forum was held in Taiwan to mark the 20th anniversary of the "1992 Consensus". During the meeting, mainland scholars stated that once the two sides reached a consensus on "one China, two representatives", they could negotiate the country's name. In response to the suggestion of negotiating the country's name, Fan Liqing, spokesperson for the Taiwan Affairs Office of the State Council, reiterated at a regular press conference that "as long as we adhere to one China, the two sides can discuss anything." In the 2010s, the economic strength of the People's Republic of China increased and was no longer significantly inferior to that of the Republic of China (Taiwan) in the 1980s. On 21 August 2016, on Phoenix Television's "Global Grand Strategy", People's Liberation Army Navy expert Li Jie responded to a question by Qiu Zhenhai about the claim that "the two sides can discuss the name of the unified country", raised by scholar Ding Xueliang, and stated that, with changing circumstances, both the hard and soft power capacities of mainland China are developing. Some of the statements made at that time may require revision under current circumstances. Wu Sihuai expressed agreement.

In early February 2022, former Kuomintang chairwoman Hung Hsiu-chu traveled to Beijing to attend the opening ceremony of the Beijing Winter Olympics and met with Wang Yang, the chairman of the National Committee of the Chinese People's Political Consultative Conference. She was later interviewed by Deutsche Welle, where she stated: "During Deng Xiaoping's time, as long as the two sides sat down to talk, they could discuss the national flag, the country's name, and the national anthem. Even my family would talk about everything. But that time has passed, and we have lost the space where we had good bargaining chips and could talk."
