= Regional Council =

Regional Council may refer to:

- Regional Council (Hong Kong), disbanded in 1999
  - Regional Council (constituency)

Regional council may refer to:

- Regional council (Cameroon)
- Regional council (France), the elected assembly of a region of France
- Regional council (Israel)
- Regional council (Italy), the parliament of a region of Italy
- Regional councils of New Zealand
- Regional councils in Scotland, units of local government abolished in 1996
- Regional Council (Tunisia)
- Governing bodies of regional municipalities in Nova Scotia:
  - Cape Breton Regional Council
  - Halifax Regional Council
- A type of local government area in Australia
