= 2022 Tunisian regional elections =

Regional elections of Tunisia

The inaugural regional elections in Tunisia were to be held in December 2018. The Fakhfakh Cabinet planned to hold the elections to the Regional Councils in 2022.
