= Three things that can be discussed =

The "three things that can be discussed" (Chinese: 三个可以谈; pinyin: Sāngè kěyǐ tán) was a proposal proposal put forward by Jiang Zemin, then General Secretary of the Chinese Communist Party, in his report to the 16th CCP National Congress in November 2002, outlining how to conduct political negotiations with Taiwan in order to achieve Chinese unification.

== Background ==
In his report to the 14th National Congress of the Chinese Communist Party in 1992, Jiang Zemin proposed that "under the premise of one China, all issues can be discussed, including the issue of the method of formal cross-strait negotiations, and we should discuss with the Taiwan side to find a solution that is appropriate for both sides." In January 1995, Jiang put forward eight propositions on Taiwan. In 1997, the report of the 15th CCP National Congress reiterated these propositions.

== Content ==
Jiang Zemin advocated that under the premise of one China, any issue could be discussed. The three things that can be discussed refers to:

1. The issue of formally ending the state of hostility between the two sides of the Taiwan Strait can be discussed
2. The issue of Taiwan's economic and cultural activity space in the international arena that is commensurate with its status can be discussed
3. The issue of the political status of the Taiwan authorities can also be discussed.

== Reactions ==
On November 27, 2002, after the release of the report of the 16th CCP National Congress, Zhang Mingqing, spokesperson for the Taiwan Affairs Office, said at a press conference that the "three things that can be discussed" demonstrate the consistency and continuity of the mainland's policy toward Taiwan and reflect the mainland's positive attitude and great sincerity on the issue of cross-strait political negotiations. The "three things that can be discussed" make the topics of cross-strait political negotiations more specific and more operational. For example, the first "things that can be discussed" end the state of hostility between the two sides of the Taiwan Strait. The "three things that can be discussed" further expand the space for cross-strait political negotiations, point out the way to break the cross-strait political deadlock, and show the compatriots on both sides of the Taiwan Strait a bright prospect of jointly striving for peaceful reunification. Professor Chen Kongli of the Institute of Taiwan Studies at Xiamen University believes that "three things that can be discussed" are the key to breaking the cross-strait (political) deadlock.
