= People on both sides of the Taiwan Strait are all of the same family =

Chinese Communist Party slogan

"People on both sides of the Taiwan Strait are all of the same family" (simplified Chinese: 两岸一家亲; traditional Chinese: 兩岸一家親; pinyin: Liǎng'àn yījiā qīn) is a political slogan used by the Chinese Communist Party (CCP) in regard to cross-strait relations. The CCP uses the slogan to emphasize perceived blood ties between the people of mainland China and Taiwan to promote Chinese unification. It was first coined by CCP general secretary Xi Jinping in 2013.

== History ==
The term was first coined by Xi Jinping, the general secretary of the Chinese Communist Party and the president of China, in 2013 at the Boao Forum for Asia, where he met with Taiwan representative Vincent Siew and proposed to concept hoping to promote cross-strait economic cooperation. That same year, Xi met with Wu Poh-hsiung, honorary chairman of the Kuomintang, at the Great Hall of the People in Beijing, reiterating the "people on both sides of the Taiwan Strait are all of the same family" concept and expressing hope for the joint realization of the rejuvenation of the Chinese nation. In October 2013, at the APEC summit in Bali, Indonesia, Xi again met with Vincent Siew, honorary chairman of the Cross-Strait Common Market Foundation, and changed "people on both sides of the Taiwan Strait are all of the same family" to "both sides of the Taiwan Strait are closely connected," which subsequently became a major propaganda concept in his work related to Taiwan.

On 18 February 2014, Xi Jinping met with Lien Chan, former chairman of the Kuomintang, who was visiting Beijing. He delivered his first speech to the people of Taiwan entitled "Realizing the Chinese Dream of the Great Rejuvenation of the Chinese Nation". Based on the development of cross-strait relations, Xi Jinping put forward a series of ideas and propositions that he believed could promote the peaceful development of cross-strait relations. He explained the principle of "people on both sides of the Taiwan Strait are all of the same family" and called on the people on both sides of the strait to jointly promote the peaceful development of cross-strait relations and realize the "Chinese Dream of the Great Rejuvenation of the Chinese Nation”. He also formally put forward the concept of "both sides of the strait are one family". In 2015, Xi Jinping met with Ma Ying-jeou, President of the Republic of China, in Singapore. Xi put forward four propositions (one China, both sides of the Taiwan Strait belong to one China, people on both sides of the Taiwan Strait are all of the same family, and oppose Taiwan independence), which were not included in the official statement after consultation between the two sides. In his speech before the meeting, Xi proposed that the two sides of the Taiwan Strait are "brothers who are connected by blood even if their bones are broken" and "a family whose blood is thicker than water".

On 2 January 2019, Xi delivered a speech at the 40th anniversary commemoration of the Message to Compatriots in Taiwan, once again conveying the concept of "compatriots on both sides of the Taiwan Strait are one family, and the affairs of both sides of the Taiwan Strait are the family affairs of compatriots on both sides of the Taiwan Strait", "the vast majority of Taiwan compatriots have a glorious patriotic tradition and are our flesh and blood relatives", "compatriots on both sides of the Taiwan Strait are connected by blood. Relatives hope for each other's well-being, and Chinese people should help Chinese people", "there is no knot that cannot be untied between relatives".

In 2021, the 19th Central Committee of the CCP approved of a historical resolution, which put the people on both sides of the Taiwan Strait are all of the same family at as part of CCP's Taiwan policy.

== See also ==
- Ideology of the Chinese Communist Party
