= Hu's Six Points =

Chinese government policy

Hu's Six Points (Chinese: 胡六点; pinyin: Hú Liùdiǎn) are a cross-strait relations policy proposed by Chinese Communist Party General Secretary Hu Jintao. Because it generally includes six points, it is called "Hu's Six Points".

== Background ==
On December 31, 2008, at a symposium in Beijing to commemorate the 30th anniversary of the publication of the "Message to Compatriots in Taiwan", Hu Jintao, General Secretary of the Chinese Communist Party and President of China, delivered a public speech entitled "Join Hands in Hand to Promote the Peaceful Development of Cross-Strait Relations and Work Together to Realize the Great Rejuvenation of the Chinese Nation", in which he proposed a six-point policy toward Taiwan.

On January 1, 2009, the People's Daily published a speech on page 2 titled "Join hands to promote the peaceful development of cross-strait relations and work together to realize the great rejuvenation of the Chinese nation — Speech at the symposium commemorating the 30th anniversary of the publication of the 'Message to Compatriots in Taiwan'".

== Content ==
Six points mentioned in the full text of the People's Daily on January 1, 2009:

1. Adhere to the one China principle and enhance political mutual trust;
2. Promote economic cooperation and promote common development;
3. Promote Chinese culture and strengthen spiritual ties;
4. Strengthen personnel exchanges and expand communication among all sectors;
5. safeguard national sovereignty and negotiate external affairs;
6. End hostilities and reach a peace agreement.
