= Regional council (Tunisia) =

Regional councils (Arabic: مجلس جهوي) in Tunisia are local groups and local councils that manages the affairs of each of the governorates of Tunisia. These councils were established in 1989, and their members are the highest government officials in the region, their deputies, and others who are appointed. Since 2017, members of the regional councils are directly elected.

== Elections ==
- 2022 Tunisian regional elections
