= Xi's Five Points =

Xi Jinping's political concept in 2019

Xi's Five Points (Chinese: 习五条; pinyin: Xí Wǔtiáo) is a concept proposed by general secretary of the Chinese Communist Party Xi Jinping regarding cross-strait relations. Proposed by Xi on 2 January 2019 in a speech commemorating the 40th anniversary of the Message to Compatriots in Taiwan, it calls for Chinese unification under the one country, two systems formula.

== History ==
On 2 January 2019, in a speech commemorating the 40th anniversary of the Message to Compatriots in Taiwan, Xi Jinping called for "peaceful reunification with Taiwan" in accordance with the one China principle and the 1992 Consensus. In Xi's view, the Taiwan issue emerged from China's weakness dating back to the Opium Wars and after World War II, the "two sides of the Taiwan straits fell into a special state of protracted political confrontation due to the civil war in China and the interferences of foreign forces." Xi called on Taiwan to reject formal independence from China, saying: "We make no promise to renounce the use of force and reserve the option of taking all necessary means." Those options, he said, could be used against "external interference." Xi also said that they "are willing to create broad space for peaceful reunification, but will leave no room for any form of separatist activities."

== Content ==
=== Preface ===
Over the past 70 years, we have grasped the changes in the times in the development of cross-strait relations, put forward policy propositions for peacefully resolving the Taiwan issue and the scientific concept of "one country, two systems", established the basic policy of "peaceful reunification and one country, two systems", and further formed the basic strategy of adhering to "one country, two systems" and promoting the reunification of the motherland.

Over the past 70 years, we have upheld the spirit of seeking common ground while reserving differences and promoted the "1992 Consensus" on the basis of the one-China principle, which states that "both sides of the Taiwan Strait belong to one China and work together to seek national reunification." We have initiated cross-strait consultations and negotiations, promoted cross-strait party-to-party exchanges, opened up a path for the peaceful development of cross-strait relations, achieved a historic meeting between the leaders of the two sides of the Taiwan Strait, and brought cross-strait political interaction to a new level.

The motherland must be unified and will inevitably be unified.

— Xi Jinping

=== Content ===
Xi's five point are as follows:

- First, work together to promote national rejuvenation and achieve the goal of peaceful reunification.
  - The vast majority of Taiwan compatriots are members of the Chinese nation and should be upright Chinese.
  - Taiwan's future lies in national reunification.
  - Let us realize the Chinese dream together.
  - The Taiwan issue arose because of the nation's weakness and chaos, and will surely end with the nation's rejuvenation.
- Second, explore the "one country, two systems" Taiwan plan and enrich the practice of peaceful reunification.
  - "Peaceful reunification and one country, two systems" is the best way to achieve national reunification.
  - Different systems are not an obstacle to unification, nor are they an excuse for division.
  - We solemnly propose that, on the common political basis of upholding the "1992 Consensus" and opposing "Taiwan independence," political parties and sectors on both sides of the Taiwan Strait nominate representative figures to conduct extensive and in-depth democratic consultations on cross-strait relations and the future of the nation, and reach institutional arrangements to promote the peaceful development of cross-strait relations.
- Third, adhere to the one-China principle and maintain the prospect of peaceful reunification.
  - Chinese people do not fight Chinese people.
  - We do not promise to renounce the use of force, but reserve the option to take all necessary measures. Our targets are external interference and a very small number of "Taiwan independence" separatists and their separatist activities, and are not targeted at our compatriots in Taiwan.
- Fourth, deepen cross-strait integration and development and lay a solid foundation for peaceful reunification.
  - Create a cross-strait common market.
  - Improve the smooth flow of economic and trade cooperation, infrastructure connectivity, energy and resource connectivity, and common industry standards.
  - We can take the lead in connecting Kinmen and Matsu with the coastal areas of Fujian in terms of water, electricity, gas and bridges.
- Fifth, achieve spiritual harmony among compatriots and enhance recognition of peaceful reunification.
  - There is no knot between family members that cannot be untied.
  - We warmly welcome young people from Taiwan to come to the mainland of China to pursue, build and realize their dreams.

== Reactions ==
In response to the speech, Taiwanese President Tsai Ing-wen said Taiwan would not accept a one country, two systems arrangement with the mainland, while stressing the need for all cross-strait negotiations to be on a government-to-government basis. She emphasized that she has never accepted the 1992 Consensus. Tsai made a shift from not publicly accepting the 1992 Consensus to directly rejecting it, stating that there's no need to talk about the 1992 Consensus anymore, because this term has already been defined by Beijing as "one country, two systems."
