= One China principle =

Foreign policy of China

- Simplified Chinese: 一个中国原则
- Traditional Chinese: 一個中國原則
Transcriptions
Standard Mandarin
- Hanyu Pinyin: Yīgè Zhōngguó yuánzé
- Wade–Giles: I-ko Chungkuo yüantse
- IPA: [ǐkɤ ʈʂʊ́ŋkwǒ yǎntsɤ̌]

The One China principle is the official position of the People's Republic of China (PRC) on the political status of Taiwan and cross-strait relations. The standard statement of the Government of the People's Republic of China on the One China Principle is as follows:

There is only one China in the world. Taiwan is an inalienable part of China's territory. The government of the People's Republic of China is the sole legal government representing the whole of China.

The Chinese Communist Party (CCP) and the government of the People's Republic of China pursue Chinese unification based on this principle and have established it as a national policy through the CCP constitution, state constitution and the 2005 Anti-Secession Law. Guided by the principle, the government of the PRC opposes the Republic of China (Taiwan) from developing diplomatic relations with other countries in the world, or any relations of a state-to-state nature, and opposes Taiwan from participating in the United Nations system and other intergovernmental international organizations. It requires that Taiwan can only participate in non-governmental international organizations under names that do not carry national characteristics, such as "Chinese Taipei" or "Taiwan, China".

This proposition is different from the "One China Principle" of the Republic of China (Taiwan), and has therefore long been not accepted by the government of the Republic of China. Before the 1970s, the ROC government used its "One China Principle" to implement a policy of "no coexistence between Han and traitors" and a closed policy against the government of the People's Republic of China, believing that it had the right to represent China and suppress the international space of the People's Republic of China. However, with the United Nations General Assembly Resolution 2758 in 1971 and Nixon's visit to China in 1972, the ROC's international diplomatic recognition decreased. With the change of the international situation after the end of the Cold War, the ROC government has stopped actively competing with mainland China for the right to represent China with the "One China Principle" since the 1990s, and instead emphasized the equality between the two sides of the Taiwan Strait; in contrast, the government of the People's Republic of China has suppressed the international space of the Republic of China with its own "One China Principle".

== History ==
On 1 October 1949, the People's Republic of China was established. On 2 October 1949, the Soviet Union recognized the PRC and became the first country to establish diplomatic relations with it. The Republic of China subsequently severed diplomatic relations with the Soviet Union. In 1950, the United Kingdom, a member of the Western Bloc, took the lead in recognizing the PRC and severed diplomatic relations with the ROC. After that, both sides did not accept dual recognition in the diplomatic field. The ROC government severed diplomatic relations with countries that recognized the PRC as representing China. On the contrary, the PRC government would never establish diplomatic relations with countries that recognized the ROC as representing China.

In 1971, the United Nations General Assembly passed Resolution 2758, in which the PRC replaced the ROC as China's representative in the United Nations. In the international community, more countries established diplomatic relations with the PRC and broke off diplomatic relations with the ROC. In the communiqués on the establishment of diplomatic relations, all countries agreed to the one-China policy proposed by China, that is, "there is only one China in the world, and the government of the People's Republic of China is the only legal government of China." The attitudes towards the status of Taiwan were different in both text and practice.

Since 1982, the preamble of the Constitution of the People's Republic of China stated that "Taiwan is part of the sacred territory of the People's Republic of China. It is the sacred duty of all Chinese people, including our compatriots in Taiwan, to accomplish the great cause of unifying the motherland." In 2005, the Anti-Secession Law was enacted to codify the one-China principle. In 2022, during the 20th National Congress of the Chinese Communist Party, the Constitution of the Chinese Communist Party was amended to include opposition to Taiwan independence.

The "One China Principle" of the People's Republic of China has been expressed in different versions, namely the "old three sentences" and the "new three sentences".

=== Old Three Sentences ===
The old three sentences adhere to the "representative theory of this government", which includes the sentence "The government of the People's Republic of China is the sole legitimate government representing all of China." This version is often used in diplomatic occasions, such as when establishing diplomatic relations with other countries and participating in international organizations. The order of the following three clauses varies slightly in different situations.

Chinese: 世界上只有一个中国，中华人民共和国政府是代表全中国的唯一合法政府，台湾是中国领土不可分割的一部分。

[There is only one China in the world. The government of the People's Republic of China is the sole legitimate government representing all of China. Taiwan is an inalienable part of China's territory.]

Chinese: 世界上只有一个中国，台湾是中国领土不可分割的一部分，中华人民共和国政府是代表全中国的唯一合法政府。

[There is only one China in the world. Taiwan is an inalienable part of China's territory. The government of the People's Republic of China is the sole legal government representing the whole of China.]

The One-China Principle and the Taiwan Issue states: "Foreign countries recognize that the Government of the People's Republic of China is the sole legitimate government representing all of China and that diplomatic relations with the Taiwan authorities shall be severed or not established. These are the principles upon which New China establishes diplomatic relations." It also states that this version of the proposition "constitutes the basic meaning of the One China Principle, the core of which is to safeguard China's sovereignty and territorial integrity."

==== Usage ====
Since the 2000s, whenever the People's Republic of China established diplomatic relations with other countries, the other governments would "recognize" this version of the "One China Principle" in the communiqués establishing diplomatic relations. On August 4, 2000, Permanent Representative of China to the United Nations also used this version of the "One China Principle" in a letter to the UN Secretary-General.

On August 4, 2022, Foreign Ministry Spokesperson Hua Chunying also used this version of the "One China Principle" during a regular press conference, and stressed that "the One China Principle has only one version and one meaning," and "no private insertion of any premise or suffix is allowed, nor is any misinterpretation or distortion." On May 10, 2024, Yang Tao, Director General of the Department of North America and Oceania of the Ministry of Foreign Affairs, also used this version of the "One China Principle" during a briefing, criticizing the United States for "claiming to adhere to the One China policy, but adding the "Taiwan Relations Act" and "Six Assurances to Taiwan" as prefixes and suffixes."

=== New Three Sentences ===
The new three sentences replaced "this government representative said" with "they all belong to China". After the General Secretary of the Chinese Communist Party Jiang Zemin delivered a speech entitled "Continue to strive for the completion of the great cause of national reunification," the "One China Principle" had a new expression. In January 1998, the government of the People's Republic of China proposed the "One China Principle" to Taiwan as follows:

Chinese: 世界上只有一个中国，台湾是中国的一部分，中国的主权和领土完整不容分割。

[There is only one China in the world. Taiwan is a part of China. China's sovereignty and territorial integrity are indivisible.]

The "One China Principle" adopted in the 2000s is expressed as follows:

Chinese: 世界上只有一个中国，大陆和台湾同属一个中国，中国的主权和领土完整不容分割。

[There is only one China in the world. Mainland China and Taiwan belong to one China. China's sovereignty and territorial integrity are indivisible.]

This version gradually changed the sentence "The government of the People's Republic of China is the only legitimate government representing all of China" to "China's sovereignty and territorial integrity cannot be divided" and changed the sentence "Taiwan is a part of China" to "Mainland China and Taiwan belong to one China." Lawyer Chen Changwen believes that the new version changes the relationship from subordinate to equal. This version is mostly used in dealing with cross-strait relations.

The Taiwan Affairs Office believes that this version of the statement is "a new elaboration of Comrade Jiang Zemin's personal statement on upholding the one-China principle. It not only upholds the consistency of the one-China principle, but also demonstrates the sincerity of striving for peaceful reunification and respect for Taiwan compatriots. It is very inclusive." The One-China Principle and the Taiwan Issue states that the purpose of this version is "to seek and expand the political foundation for cross-strait relations" and that its application is "before reunification, in handling cross-strait affairs, and especially in cross-strait negotiations".

On the anniversary of Jiang Zemin's speech "Continue to Strive to Promote the Completion of the Great Cause of National Reunification", Vice Premier Qian Qichen used this version of the "One China Principle" in his speeches. In August 2000, Vice Premier Qian Qichen also used this version of the "One China Principle" when meeting with a delegation from the United Daily News Group of Taiwan. In November 2002, Jiang Zemin also used this version of the "One China Principle" in his report to the 16th National Congress of the Chinese Communist Party. This version of the "One China Principle" was also used in the Anti-Secession Law passed on March 14, 2005.

=== 1992 Consensus ===
The 1992 Consensus is a political term referring to the alleged outcome of a meeting in 1992 between the semi-official representatives of the Chinese Communist Party (CCP)-led People's Republic of China (PRC) in mainland China and the Kuomintang (KMT)-led Republic of China (ROC) on Taiwan. The consensus is often credited with establishing a diplomatic foundation for semi-official cross-strait exchanges beginning in the early 1990s and accepting it is a precondition set by the PRC for engaging in cross-strait dialogue.

== The principle ==
=== Taiwan ===
The white paper released by the government of the People's Republic of China states that the Chinese government "resumed the exercise of sovereignty over Taiwan" on October 25, 1945, and China has therefore legally and factually recovered Taiwan; after its establishment in 1949, the People's Republic of China replaced the Republic of China's rule over China, completing the regime change in the sense of international law. Therefore, the government of the People's Republic of China, as the sole legitimate government of China, has the right to exercise sovereignty over Taiwan.

The preamble to the 1982 Constitution of the People's Republic of China stipulates that "Taiwan is part of the sacred territory of the People's Republic of China. It is the sacred duty of all Chinese people, including our compatriots in Taiwan, to accomplish the great cause of unifying the motherland." The 2005 Anti-Secession Law stipulates that:

Chinese: 世界上只有一个中国，大陆和台湾同属一个中国，中国的主权和领土完整不容分割。维护国家主权和领土完整是包括台湾同胞在内的全中国人民的共同义务。 台湾是中国的一部分。国家绝不允许“台独”分裂势力以任何名义、任何方式把台湾从中国分裂出去。

[There is only one China in the world. The mainland and Taiwan belong to the same China. China's sovereignty and territorial integrity cannot be divided. Maintaining national sovereignty and territorial integrity is the common obligation of all Chinese people, including our compatriots in Taiwan. Taiwan is a part of China. The state will never allow the "Taiwan independence" secessionist forces to split Taiwan from China in any name or by any means.]

— Article 2 of the Anti-Secession Law

Chinese:

坚持一个中国原则，是实现祖国和平统一的基础。

以和平方式实现祖国统一，最符合台湾海峡两岸同胞的根本利益。国家以最大的诚意，尽最大的努力，实现和平统一。

国家和平统一后，台湾可以实行不同于大陆的制度，高度自治。

[Upholding the one-China principle is the basis for achieving the peaceful reunification of the motherland.

Realizing the reunification of the motherland through peaceful means is in the best interests of compatriots on both sides of the Taiwan Straits. The country will make the greatest sincerity and efforts to achieve peaceful reunification.

After the peaceful reunification of the country, Taiwan can implement a system different from that of the mainland and enjoy a high degree of autonomy.]

— Article 5 of the Anti-Secession Law

=== Position on the Republic of China ===
The White Paper of the Government of the People's Republic of China states that the Chinese people, led by the Chinese Communist Party, overthrew the "Republic of China" government in Nanjing and established the People's Republic of China on 1 October 1949. The government of the People's Republic of China became the only legitimate government in China. The paper states that "Since the Kuomintang ruling group retreated to Taiwan, although its regime continues to use the names of 'Republic of China' and 'Government of the Republic of China', it has long lost the right to exercise national sovereignty on behalf of China and has always been only a local authority on Chinese territory."

Since the 1980s, the government of the People's Republic of China, news media, and publishing organizations have a series of regulations, including prohibitions, when using terms related to government agencies, personnel identities, laws and regulations of the Republic of China; These are called Taiwan-related terms. Specifically:

1. Administrative agencies at all levels below the city and county level (including cities under the jurisdiction of the Executive Yuan) in Taiwan and their relevant personnel can be addressed directly, such as Taipei Mayor Ko Wen-je and New Taipei City Mayor Eric Chu.
2. Administrative agencies at or above the city and county level in Taiwan (excluding and including cities under the jurisdiction of the Central Government) must be put in quotation marks, and national-level agencies must be handled flexibly. For example, "Governor of Taiwan Province" Lin Hsi-yao, leader of the Taiwan region Tsai Ing-wen, and Taiwan's administrative departments, etc., are generally referred to as the Taiwan region or the Taiwan authorities.
3. Taiwanese political parties can be referred to directly, such as Kuomintang Chairman Hung Hsiu-chu.
4. For Taiwan's official non-governmental organizations, quotation marks are required, such as "Taipei Economic and Cultural Representative Office in the United States" and "China Travel Service"
5. Groups and organizations in Taiwan with the words "National" or "Republic of China" should be avoided, and those with the words "China" or "China" should be put in quotation marks as appropriate.
6. The laws regarding Taiwan are called "regulations", etc. National terms such as passport, extradition, illegal immigration, and white paper also need to be adapted.
7. Buildings or tourist attractions with national connotations in Taiwan also need to be avoided, such as the Presidential Office being renamed the "Taiwan Regional Leader's Office" (or simply the "Leader's Office") or "××× Office" (such as "Ma Ying-jeou's Office"), and the Taipei Sun Yat-sen Memorial Hall being renamed the "Sun Yat-sen Memorial Hall"

In the legal systems of international law and domestic law, the People's Republic of China does not recognize the legal status of the Republic of China. The political view that the Republic of China exists and can represent China is classified as two Chinas, which is Taiwan independence and is illegal in law. The view that the Taiwan authorities are the legitimate regime and a sovereign and independent country is called One China, One Taiwan, which is Taiwan independence.

In non-governmental affairs, limited non-governmental exchanges between the two sides of the Taiwan Strait are allowed through consultation between the Straits Exchange Foundation and the Association for Relations Across the Taiwan Straits, but they cannot be conducted in the official form of the Republic of China.

=== Taiwan residents ===
The 1991 Regulations on the Administration of Chinese Citizens’ Travel to and from the Taiwan Region defines Taiwan residents as "Chinese citizens residing in the Taiwan region". In the legal system of the People's Republic of China, it is recognized that the vast majority of citizens of the Republic of China are Chinese citizens (citizens of the People's Republic of China) and have nationality of the People's Republic of China.

=== Relations between international organizations and Taiwan ===
The White Paper of the Government of the People's Republic of China states that, as the sole legitimate government of China, the Government of the People's Republic of China has the right and obligation to exercise national sovereignty and represent the whole of China in international organizations. Taiwan's attempt to participate in certain international organizations that only sovereign states can participate in is an act of creating "two Chinas".

The Government of the People's Republic of China believes that all agencies and other intergovernmental international organizations of the United Nations system are intergovernmental international organizations attended by representatives of sovereign states, and Taiwan has no right to participate. The Chinese government believes that after the adoption of UN General Assembly Resolution 2758, the issue of China's representation in the United Nations was completely resolved. The Government of the People's Republic of China opposes Taiwan's admission into the United Nations and believes that there is no question of Taiwan joining again.

The Government of the People's Republic of China also believes that Taiwan's membership in the Asian Development Bank under the name of "Chinese Taipei" and in regional economic organizations such as the Asia-Pacific Economic Cooperation (APEC) under the name of "Chinese Taipei" is based on the agreements or understandings reached between the Government of the People's Republic of China and relevant parties, which clearly stipulate that the People's Republic of China participates as a sovereign state and Taiwan participates only as a region of China. This is purely a special arrangement and cannot constitute a "model" for other intergovernmental international organizations and international activities to emulate.

The Government of the People's Republic of China also believes that for non-governmental international organizations, relevant organizations on the Taiwan side can only participate under the name of "Taipei, China" or "Taiwan, China" when the corresponding organizations of the People's Republic of China reach an agreement or understanding with the relevant parties and when national organizations in China participate under the name of "China".

=== Discussion on cross-strait relations ===
- The Message to Compatriots in Taiwan was discussed and adopted at the Fifth Session of the Standing Committee of the 5th National People's Congress on December 26, 1978, and published on New Year's Day 1979. The message says:

Today, achieving China's reunification is the will of the people and the general trend. The world generally recognizes that there is only one China and that the government of the People's Republic of China is the only legitimate government of China. The recent signing of the Sino-Japanese Treaty of Peace and Friendship and the normalization of Sino-US relations show that the trend is coming and no one can stop it. At present, the motherland is stable and united, and the situation is better than ever before. People of all ethnic groups on the mainland are working together to achieve the great goal of the four modernizations. We earnestly hope that Taiwan will return to the motherland as soon as possible and jointly develop the great cause of nation-building. Our national leaders have expressed their determination to take into account the actual situation and complete the great cause of national reunification. When solving the issue of reunification, they will respect the current situation in Taiwan and the opinions of people from all walks of life in Taiwan, adopt reasonable policies and measures, and not let the people of Taiwan suffer losses. People from all walks of life in Taiwan have also expressed their homesickness and expressed their wish to "recognize and return", put forward various suggestions, and warmly hope to return to the embrace of the motherland as soon as possible. Today, all conditions are conducive to reunification. It can be said that everything is ready. No one should go against the will of the nation, list Taiwan as a country, and go against the trend of history.”

- On March 26, 1983, Chinese leader Deng Xiaoping met with Yang Liyu. The main points of the talks were summarized as Deng's Six Points.
- In 2002, Chinese Premier Zhu Rongji stated that "Mainland China and Taiwan belong to one China".
- In 2002, Jiang Zemin, General Secretary of the Chinese Communist Party, stated in his report to the 16th National Congress of the Chinese Communist Party that under the 'one China' principle, everything can be discussed, and summarized as three things that can be discussed.
- In 2008, Hu Jintao, General Secretary of the CCP Central Committee, said: We will never waver in upholding the one-China principle.
- On December 31, 2008, a symposium commemorating the 30th anniversary of the publication of the "Message to Compatriots in Taiwan" was held in the Great Hall of the People in Beijing. Hu Jintao delivered a speech: "The practice of the development of cross-strait relations over the past 30 years has taught us that in order to promote the development of cross-strait relations and achieve the peaceful reunification of the motherland, the most important thing is to follow the principle of "peaceful reunification and one country, two systems" and the eight propositions for developing cross-strait relations and promoting the peaceful reunification of the motherland at this stage. We must never waver in upholding the one-China principle, never give up the efforts to strive for peaceful reunification, never change the policy of placing our hopes on the people of Taiwan, never compromise in opposing "Taiwan independence" separatist activities, firmly grasp the theme of peaceful development of cross-strait relations, sincerely seek the well-being of compatriots on both sides of the strait, seek peace in the Taiwan Strait, safeguard national sovereignty and territorial integrity, and safeguard the fundamental interests of the Chinese nation."
- In December 2012, Taiwan held a forum to celebrate the 20th anniversary of the "1992 Consensus". During the meeting, mainland scholars said that once the two sides reach a consensus on "one China, one Chinese representation", they can negotiate the country's name. In response to the suggestion of negotiating the country's name, Fan Liqing, spokesperson for the Taiwan Affairs Office, reiterated at a regular press conference that "as long as we adhere to one China, the two sides can discuss anything."
- In 2013, Premier Li Keqiang stated: "Both sides of the Taiwan Strait belong to one China, and those living on both sides are brothers and sisters. The word and concept of "fellow countrymen" are deeply rooted in Chinese culture. I believe this is also the root of the Chinese nation's 5,000 years of unending prosperity. As the saying goes, even if bones are broken, the tendons remain connected. There is no knot that cannot be untied between fellow countrymen and brothers."
- On January 27, 2014, Ma Xiaoguang, spokesperson for the Taiwan Affairs Office, stated: "The two sides of the Taiwan Strait belong to one China, which is a fact that cannot be changed by any force or person." He also said: "The leaders of the Democratic Progressive Party, out of their own selfish interests, recently went to the international community to promote the idea of 'Taiwan independence', and insisted on holding the mindset of confrontation with the mainland, going against the historical trend of the peaceful development of cross-strait relations. This is not only a futile move, but on the contrary, it once again clearly exposes its 'Taiwan independence' nature to the world, and will inevitably end in complete failure."
- In 2015, when the leaders of both sides of the Taiwan Strait met, Zhang Zhijun relayed Xi Jinping's four points, emphasizing the "one China principle", upholding the "1992 Consensus", and opposing Taiwan independence.
- On October 18, 2017, the 19th National Congress of the Chinese Communist Party opened at the Great Hall of the People in Beijing. On behalf of the 18th Central Committee, Xi Jinping, General Secretary of the Chinese Communist Party, delivered a report to the Congress entitled "Securing a Decisive Victory in Building a Moderately Prosperous Society in All Respects and Striving for the Great Success of Socialism with Chinese Characteristics for a New Era". In his report, Xi Jinping emphasized that the "1992 Consensus" that embodies the one- China principle clearly defines the fundamental nature of cross-strait relations and is the key to ensuring the peaceful development of cross-strait relations. By recognizing the historical fact of the "1992 Consensus" and acknowledging that both sides of the Taiwan Strait belong to one China, the two sides will be able to engage in dialogue and negotiate to resolve issues of concern to compatriots on both sides of the Taiwan Strait, and there will be no obstacles for any political party or group in Taiwan to interact with the mainland.
- On May 20, 2024, Foreign Ministry Spokesperson Wang Wenbin stated at a regular press conference, "There is only one China in the world. Taiwan is an inalienable part of China’s territory. The government of the People’s Republic of China is the only legitimate government representing all of China. No matter how the political situation on the island of Taiwan changes, it cannot change the historical and legal fact that both sides of the Taiwan Strait belong to one China, nor can it change the basic pattern of the international community’s adherence to the one-China principle. It still less can it change the historical trend that China will and will inevitably be unified."
