= Ye's Nine Points =

Chinese policy in 1981

The Nine-Point Policy on the Peaceful Reunification of Taiwan (Chinese: 有关和平统一台湾的九条方针政策; pinyin: Yǒuguān Hépíng Tǒngyī Táiwān de Jiǔtiáo Fāngzhēn Zhèngcè), commonly known as the Ye's Nine Points (Chinese: 叶九条; pinyin: Yè Jiǔtiáo), was proposed by Ye Jianying, Chairman of the Standing Committee of the National People's Congress, to a Xinhua News Agency reporter on 1 October 1981 as the basis for negotiations with the Republic of China government in Taiwan. It is one of mainland China's policy documents on Taiwan.

== Background ==
Ye's Nine Points was a peace offensive proposed by China to prevent the United States from selling FX fighter jets to Taiwan.

== Content ==
The contents of the nine articles are as follows:

1. The Kuomintang and the Chinese Communist Party can negotiate on an equal footing;
2. The two sides reached an agreement on postal, trade, air, family visits, tourism, and academic, cultural, and sports exchanges;
3. After reunification, Taiwan can retain its military and, as a special administrative region, enjoy special autonomy;
4. Taiwan's social, economic system, lifestyle, and economic and cultural relations with other foreign countries remain unchanged; private property, housing, land, business ownership, legal inheritance rights, and foreign investment shall not be infringed;
5. Taiwan's political leaders can serve as leaders of national political institutions and participate in national management;
6. When Taiwan's local finances are in difficulty, the central government may provide subsidies at its discretion;
7. Taiwanese people who wish to return to the mainland to settle down will be guaranteed proper arrangements, free coming and going, and no discrimination;
8. We welcome Taiwanese business people to invest in the mainland and guarantee their legitimate rights and interests and profits;
9. We welcome people and groups from all walks of life in Taiwan to provide unified suggestions and discuss national affairs.

== Analysis ==
It is generally believed that Ye's Nine Points already included the basic meaning of the "one country, two systems" policy. In February 1984, when Deng Xiaoping met with American international relations expert Zbigniew Brzezinski, he discussed the concept of "one country, two systems" based on Ye's Nine Points. In the same year, at the second session of the 6th National People's Congress, Premier Zhao Ziyang formally proposed the concept of "one country, two systems".
