= One Principle and Four Points =

The One Principle and Four Points (Chinese: 一纲四目; pinyin: Yī gāng sì mù) is a policy of the Chinese Communist Party (CCP) toward Taiwan summarized by Premier Zhou Enlai in 1963 based on proposals by Chinese leader Mao Zedong. It offered Chiang Kai-shek and the local administration in Taiwan wide-ranking autonomy in local affairs if they accepted Chinese unification.

== History ==
In August 1958, the Second Taiwan Strait Crisis broke out, with the shelling of the islands of Kinmen (Quemoy) and the Matsu Islands by the People's Republic of China (PRC). On 6 October, Mao Zedong, the Chairman of the Chinese Communist Party, announced that "starting from 6 October, the shelling will be suspended for seven days. but on the condition that there are no American escorts." On 13 October, the People’s Daily published the order of Peng Dehuai, the Minister of National Defense, ordering the Fujian troops to suspend the shelling of Kinmen for two weeks. On the same day, Mao Zedong met with Cao Juren, a writer for the Nanyang Siang Pau in Singapore who was living in Hong Kong. Zhou Enlai, Zhang Shizhao and others accompanied him.

During the conversation, Mao said: "As long as Chiang Kai-shek and his son can resist the United States, we can cooperate with them. We agree with Chiang Kai-shek's policy of protecting Kinmen and Matsu. If Chiang withdraws from Kinmen and Matsu, the situation will be hopeless, the people's hearts will waver, and it is very likely to collapse. As long as we do not get involved with the United States, Taiwan, Penghu, Kinmen and Matsu can all be under Chiang's control for as many years as he wants, but we must allow air traffic and not allow them to carry out espionage activities on the mainland. Taiwan, Penghu, Kinmen and Matsu must all return. Our policy is to isolate the United States. He has no choice but to leave. If he does not leave, he will be passive. We must tell Taiwan that we do not talk about the Taiwan issue at all in Warsaw. We only talk about getting the Americans to leave. Chiang should not be afraid that we will deal with him together with the Americans. Their relationship with the United States will break down, and they will be connected with the mainland. The branches will be connected, but the roots are still yours. They can survive and do what you want." Zhang Shizhao said: "In this way, American aid will be cut off." Mao said: "We will supply him with everything. His army can be preserved. I will not pressure him to reduce his troops or streamline administration. Let him implement the Three Principles of the People. He can oppose communism there, but we will not send planes or spies to cause trouble. He will not send white spies, and I will not send red spies." Cao Juren asked: "Some people in Taiwan asked about the lifestyle?" Mao Zedong said: "It is their own lifestyle."

Mao's talk was an important supplement to the basic policy of peacefully resolving the Taiwan issue. It was later summarized by Zhou Enlai as One Principle and Four Points and conveyed to Taiwan through Zhang Zhizhong's letter to Chen Cheng on 4 January 1963. The One Principle is: "As long as Taiwan returns to the motherland, all other issues will be properly handled in accordance with the opinions of President (Chiang Kai-shek) and you". The Four Points include: "After Taiwan returns to the motherland, except for diplomacy which must be unified under the central government, all military and political power and personnel arrangements will be handled by President and you; any shortfall in military, political and construction expenses will be allocated by the central government; social reforms in Taiwan can be delayed and will be carried out only when conditions are ripe and after consultation and decision-making in accordance with the opinions of President and you; both sides agree not to send people to do anything that undermines the unity of the other side".

== Content ==
The One Principle is that "Taiwan must be unified with China." The Four Points are:

- After Taiwan was unified with the motherland, apart from the requirement to be unified with the central government in foreign affairs, all military and political power, personnel arrangements, etc., in Taiwan were entrusted to Chiang Kai-shek.
- All funds shortfall in Taiwan's military, political, and economic development expenses are covered by the central government.
- Social reforms in Taiwan can be implemented gradually, only when conditions are ripe and Chiang Kai-shek's opinions are respected, and after consultation and decision-making.
- Neither side would send spies to the other or take any actions that would undermine the other's unity. Mao Zedong repeatedly stated that as long as the Taiwan authorities held onto Taiwan and prevented it from splitting from China, the mainland would not change its current policy toward Taiwan.
