= Message to Compatriots in Taiwan =

1950 Chinese Communist Party document

The Message to Compatriots in Taiwan (Chinese: 告台湾同胞书; pinyin: Gào Táiwān Tóngbāo Shū) is an open letter issued to Taiwan by the Chinese Communist Party, eight minor political parties, the National People's Congress and other affiliated people's organizations after the founding of the People's Republic of China. It is regarded as the earliest policy document of the Chinese Communist Party and the government of the People's Republic of China on cross-strait relations. It has been issued six times in history. Among them, the most famous one was issued by the Standing Committee of the National People's Congress on 1 January 1979, the day when China and the United States established diplomatic relations. Its influence continues to this day. Its content mainly discussed ending the military confrontation between the two sides of the strait, and proposed the "Three Links" across the strait to expand cross-strait exchanges.

== History ==
The Message to Compatriots in Taiwan was first published on 28 February 1950, by the Taiwan Democratic Self-Government League, proposing to complete the task of liberating Taiwan. The second publication was on 6 October 1958, the day after the end of the 23 August 1958 Artillery War during the Second Taiwan Strait Crisis. It was written by Mao Zedong, Chairman of the Chinese Communist Party, and later published by Minister of National Defense Peng Dehuai. Its full title is Letter from the Ministry of National Defense of the People's Republic of China to Compatriots in Taiwan. Its content requires Taiwan to jointly deal with imperialism led by the United States, and refers to the August 23 Artillery Battle as a punishment in nature and notifies in advance to stop shelling Kinmen for seven days. The third letter was published on 25 October 1958, namely, Another Letter from the Ministry of National Defense of the People's Republic of China to Compatriots in Taiwan, which asked Taiwan to unite and that there was no way out for an alliance with the United States, and that they should unite to face the outside world. The fourth was published on 1 November 1958, namely, The Third Message to Taiwan Compatriots from the Ministry of National Defense of the People's Republic of China, but it was never published.

The fifth publication was on 1 January 1979. The Message to Compatriots in Taiwan was published by the Standing Committee of the National People's Congress and was passed by a NPC Standing Committee session chaired by Ye Jianying. At the same time, China's Minister of Defense Xu Xiangqian issued a statement on stopping the shelling of the Kinmen Islands since 1958. The content of the statement was to propose to Taiwan that the unification of China was the general trend and the will of the people, and that the split situation should be ended as soon as possible and China should be unified. In this regard, it also proposed the policy of ending the military confrontation between the two sides of the strait, opening up the "three links across the strait", and expanding cross-strait exchanges. This publication caused a major reaction at home and abroad and was regarded as the first change in the mainland China's Taiwan policy.

Although leaders of the Chinese Communist Party and the People's Republic of China would express their positions on Taiwan afterwards, they never used the name Message to Compatriots in Taiwan again. It was not until 2 January 2019, that CCP General Secretary Xi Jinping issued a Message to Compatriots in Taiwan, establishing Xi's Five Points to replace the previous Jiang's Eight Points and Hu's Six Points and other major policies toward Taiwan.

== Commemoration ==
=== 10th anniversary ===
On 30 December 1988, a symposium was held to commemorate the 10th anniversary of the publication of the Message to Compatriots in Taiwan. Wu Xueqian, Vice Premier of the State Council and deputy director of the Central Leading Group for Taiwan Affairs, delivered a speech entitled "China Must Be Unified, the Country Should Not Be Split".

=== 20th anniversary ===
On 28 January 1999, a symposium was held to mark the 20th anniversary of the publication of the Message to Compatriots in Taiwan. Qian Qichen, Vice Premier and deputy director of the Central Leading Group for Taiwan Affairs, delivered a speech entitled "Striving Hard to Promote the Great Cause of Peaceful Reunification of the Motherland". The symposium also commemorated the 4th anniversary of the publication of Jiang's Eight Points.

=== 30th anniversary ===
On the morning of 31 December 2008, a symposium commemorating the 30th anniversary of the publication of the Message to Compatriots in Taiwan was held in the Great Hall of the People in Beijing. CCP General Secretary Hu Jintao delivered a speech entitled "Join Hands to Promote the Peaceful Development of Cross-Strait Relations and Work Together to Realize the Great Rejuvenation of the Chinese Nation." The cross-strait policy he proposed is known as "Hu's Six Points."

=== 40th anniversary ===
On the morning of 2 January 2019, a commemoration meeting for the 40th anniversary of the publication of the Message to Compatriots in Taiwan was held at the Great Hall of the People in Beijing. CCP General Secretary Xi Jinping delivered a speech entitled "Working Together to Achieve the Great Rejuvenation of the Nation and Promote the Peaceful Reunification of the Motherland", setting the tone of the 1992 Consensus as "both sides of the Taiwan Strait belong to one China and work together to seek national reunification", achieving the goal of "peaceful reunification and one country, two systems", and deepening cross-strait exchanges to achieve spiritual harmony between compatriots. However, he did not promise to renounce the use of force against Taiwan, and reserved the option of taking all necessary measures to unify Taiwan.

In early 2019, China Central Television launched a special historical documentary, "Taiwan Strait Chronicles". It is worth noting that former KMT Chairman Eric Chu, who had previously announced his participation in the 2020 presidential election, also appeared in the documentary and talked about the 1992 Consensus. Eric Chu appeared in the fourth episode and said that the 1992 Consensus was an important foundation and an important milestone, "because it was from the '1992 Consensus' that the two sides of the Taiwan Strait could communicate and move towards peace." Taiwanese politicians invited other former KMT chairmen Lien Chan, Wu Po-hsiung, Hung Hsiu-chu, etc.

President Tsai Ing-wen of the Republic of China stated that the Republic of China did not reach the 1992 Consensus with the mainland in 1993, and will never accept "one country, two systems". She also criticized Xi Jinping for interpreting the 1992 Consensus as "one China, one country, two systems". Tsai Ing-wen also believed that the Beijing authorities' pressure on international companies and military aircraft and warships to fly around Taiwan would not bring spiritual harmony to Taiwan. The Taiwan Affairs Office of the State Council of the People's Republic of China issued a press release criticizing Tsai Ing-wen after her speech. Spokesperson Ma Xiaoguang said, "The leader of the Democratic Progressive Party authorities, Tsai Ing-wen, made irresponsible remarks and blatantly vented her separatist position of the 'two-state theory', which violated the wishes of compatriots on both sides of the Taiwan Strait to improve and develop cross-strait relations, further incited cross-strait confrontation, and undermined the peaceful development of cross-strait relations." This is the first time that the Taiwan Affairs Office of the CPC Central Committee and the Taiwan Affairs Office of the State Council have characterized the Taiwan independence stance of the Tsai Ing-wen authorities in Taiwan since Tsai Ing-wen took office in May 2016.
