= White Paper on the Taiwan Question =

Statements by the Chinese government

The White Paper on the Taiwan Question is a collective name for three white papers published by the Taiwan Affairs Office of the Central Committee of the Chinese Communist Party and the State Council Information Office dealing with the political status of Taiwan and Chinese unification. They were published in September 1993, February 2000, and August 2022, respectively.

== The Taiwan Issue and China's Reunification (1993) ==
The "Taiwan Issue and China's Unification" was completed in August 1993 and published on 1 September 1993. The full text is approximately 11,100 words. When this white paper was published, the mainland China and Taiwan had just opened up to non-governmental exchanges, and the two governments were in the stage of trying to make contact. In April before the white paper was published, representatives of the two sides had just held the first Wang–Koo summit in Singapore. In June, the Taiwanese President Lee Teng-hui proposed Taiwan's participation in the United Nations/ The representative of the Republic of China government at APEC stated that "the Republic of China and the People's Republic of China are two sovereign states that are not subordinate to each other".

== The One-China Principle and the Taiwan Issue (2000) ==
The "One China Principle and the Taiwan Issue" was published on 1 February 2000. The content of the full paper is similar to that of the first white paper.

In July of the year before the White Paper was published, President Lee Teng-hui proposed the "two-state theory", meaning the White Paper was considered to be targeting Lee. The documents directly names Lee 16 times, defining him as "the general representative of Taiwan's separatist forces, a destroyer of the stability of the Taiwan Strait, a stumbling block to the development of Sino-US relations, and a troublemaker for peace and stability in the Asia-Pacific region". In addition to refuting the "two-state theory", the fifth part of the White Paper also rejected the proposals such as a Taiwan independence referendum, "two Germany's model" and "a struggle for democracy".

== The Taiwan Question and China's Reunification in the New Era (2022) ==
The "Taiwan Question and China's Reunification in the New Era" is a white paper published by the Taiwan Affairs Office and State Council Information Office of the People's Republic of China (PRC). It is the first white paper concerning Taiwan published since 2000 and was released a few days after Nancy Pelosi's 2022 visit to Taiwan. In it, the PRC urged for Taiwan to unify with it under the "one country, two systems" principle.

Taiwan's Mainland Affairs Council said the document was "wishful thinking and disregarding facts".

== See also ==
- Chinese unification
