= Jiang's Eight Points =

Jiang's Eight Points (Chinese: 江八点; pinyin: Jiāng Bādiǎn) is a speech by Jiang Zemin, then general secretary of the Chinese Communist Party, entitled "Continue to Strive for the Completion of the Great Cause of National Reunification" on January 30, 1995. The speech mentioned eight propositions on developing cross-strait relations and promoting the Chinese unification process. It was issued at the time of the 100th anniversary of the Treaty of Shimonoseki.

In response to Jiang's eight points, Lee Teng-hui, then President of the Republic of China and Chairman of the Kuomintang, made a formal response on April 8, which was called Lee's six points In 2002, Jiang Zemin reiterated in his report to the 16th CCP National Congress that "under the premise of one China, all issues can be discussed", that is, three issues can be discussed.

== Content ==
The main content of Jiang Zemin's speech was:

1. Adhering to the one-China principle is the foundation and premise for achieving peaceful reunification. China's sovereignty and territory must not be divided. Any speech and action to create "Taiwan independence" should be firmly opposed; advocating "split and separate governance" and "two Chinas at different stages" violates the one-China principle and should be firmly opposed.
2. We have no objection to Taiwan developing non-governmental economic and cultural relations with foreign countries, but we oppose Taiwan's so-called "expanding international living space" with the goal of creating "two Chinas" or "one China, one Taiwan".
3. Conduct cross-strait peaceful reunification negotiations. In the process of peaceful reunification negotiations, representative persons from various political parties and groups on both sides of the strait can be included. As a first step, the two sides can first negotiate on "formally ending the hostile state between the two sides under the one-China principle."
4. We strive to achieve peaceful reunification, and Chinese people do not fight against Chinese people. Our refusal to promise to renounce the use of force is by no means directed at our compatriots in Taiwan, but at foreign forces interfering in China's reunification and seeking "Taiwan independence".
5. Vigorously develop cross-strait economic exchanges and cooperation. Continue to implement the policy of encouraging Taiwanese investment in the long term. Continue to strengthen the mutual exchanges and contacts between compatriots on both sides of the strait, enhance understanding and mutual trust. Take practical steps to accelerate the realization of direct "three links".
6. The 5,000-year-old splendid culture created by the Chinese people of all ethnic groups is the spiritual bond that binds all Chinese people together and is also an important foundation for achieving peaceful reunification. The compatriots on both sides of the Taiwan Straits should inherit and carry forward the fine traditions of Chinese culture.
7. We fully respect the lifestyle and the desire of our Taiwan compatriots to be masters of their own house, and protect all the legitimate rights and interests of our Taiwan compatriots. We welcome people from all political parties and all walks of life in Taiwan to exchange views with us on cross-strait relations and peaceful reunification, and we also welcome them to visit us.
8. We welcome the leaders of the Taiwan authorities to visit us in an appropriate capacity; we are also willing to accept Taiwan's invitation to visit Taiwan. We handle Chinese affairs ourselves, without the need for any international occasions.
