= Liu Zhenya incident =

2025 controversy in Taiwan

In 2025, Taiwanese YouTuber Pa Chiung and others reported that Liu Zhenya, a mainland Chinese spouse and internet celebrity in Taiwan, promoted Chinese unification by military means on her YouTube, Douyin and other social media channels. Taiwan's National Immigration Agency determined that Liu violated the Cross-Strait Act, and revoked her dependent residence permit in Taiwan and ordered her to leave Taiwan. This marked the first time Taiwan had expelled a mainland Chinese spouse. She was also restricted from reapplying for five years, becoming the first mainland Chinese spouse to be punished. At the same time, the National Immigration Agency launched an investigation into similar incidents and also punished two other cases of violations in March. Her deportation caused a controversy in Taiwan, with the Democratic Progressive Party (DPP) and its supporters arguing Liu's speech constituted a threat to national security and sovereignty, while the Kuomintang and the Taiwan People's Party (TPP) and their supporters arguing the action undermined freedom of speech in Taiwan.

== Background ==
Liu Zhenya (Chinese: 刘振亚; pinyin: Liú Zhènyà) is a mainland Chinese spouse and internet celebrity whose online name is Yaya (Chinese: 亚亚; pinyin: Yàyà). She was born in Chenzhou City, Hunan. She married a Taiwanese man and has three children, and had been living in Taiwan for 10 years at the time of her deportation. She obtained the right to reside in Taiwan through her relatives, but had not yet become a citizen of Taiwan. She served as "Longtai Cultural Exchange Advisor" and "Cross-Strait Youth Exchange Ambassador" in Heilongjiang Province. She also operated video and audio channels on platforms such as YouTube and Douyin under the name "Yaya in Taiwan". In March 2025, she had 500,000 followers on Douyin. The content mostly promoted Chinese unification, "both sides of the Taiwan Strait are one family", and unification with Taiwan by military means. In one example video, she said that "Maybe when we wake up tomorrow morning, the island will already be covered with five-star red flags, and it makes me happy even just thinking about it", referencing the flag of China. She often appeared in the video with her Taiwanese daughter "Xiao Danggui", which attracted the attention of Taiwanese society.

== Events ==
In March 2025, due to the report by internet celebrity Pa Chiung that Liu Zhenya's public statements were potentially harmful to national security, the National Immigration Agency (NIA) notified Liu Zhenya to come to the agency to state her opinion on 4 March. On 11 March, in accordance with Article 14, Paragraph 1, Item 4 of the Regulations Governing Permits for People from the Mainland Area to Reside in Taiwan for Long-Term Residence or Settlement with Relatives, her permit for dependent residence in Taiwan was revoked, and she was not permitted to apply for dependent residence again for five years. NIA said that she "caused significant public concern and posed potential threats to national security and social stability" with her comments. On 15 March, Liu uploaded a video claiming that her stay in Taiwan had been changed from 6 months to leaving within 10 days. However, the NIA clarified that it had never agreed to allow a stay of 6 months in Taiwan.

On 21 March, Liu Zhenya applied for a stay of execution, which was rejected by the Taipei High Administrative Court that evening. After the rejection, Liu filed an appeal on 24 March and gave an interview to TVBS, denying any intention to leave Taiwan. On the evening of 27 March, the Supreme Administrative Court rejected the appeal. Her husband Huang Chun-hung and three children also applied to the court for a stay of execution, which was also rejected by the Taipei High Administrative Court on the evening of 25 March.

On the morning of 25 March, Liu held a press conference, requesting the outside world to face up to NIA's "abuse of power", and hoping to revoke the administrative punishment and avoid the separation of family members. She also said that she advocated peaceful reunification, not advocating reunification by force. At the same time, she accepted an exclusive interview with Dongsen News, saying that her children were all born in Taiwan. She denied having a sham marriage. Afterwards, in order to avoid leaving a record of illegality and affecting her right to return to Taiwan to visit relatives, Liu left Taiwan by plane from Songshan Airport that night following the advice of her lawyer Yeh Ching-Yuan and "out of respect for Taiwanese law", while denying any wrongdoing. Her plane later landed at the Fuzhou Changle International Airport.

== Subsequent developments ==
On 26 March, the National Immigration Agency issued another similar case involving mainland spouses Xiaowei and Enqi. The NIA notified them to state their opinions according to procedure because of their such as "Taiwan is full of this five-star red flag" and "People's Liberation Army exercises show strong military strength and firm defense of national sovereignty". After consulting with the Mainland Affairs Council and other relevant agencies, the agency revoked their "family-dependent" and "long-term" residence permits respectively, and ordered them to leave Taiwan before 31 March. On the afternoon of March 28, Xiaowei and Enqi, accompanied by their Taiwanese husbands, went to the Presidential Office Building and unfurled a banner that read "Give Me Back My Mother's Rights" and submitted a petition specifically to the President. A week later, the two left the country one after the other, and the Taiwan Affairs Office reiterated its dissatisfaction with this handling of the matter, which it felt violated the marriage and parentage rights of mainland spouses.

In April 2025, the National Immigration Agency sent a letter to mainland spouses who have settled or registered in Taiwan, requiring them to submit a "notarized certificate of loss of original place of residence" within three months, otherwise their household registration in Taiwan will be revoked. On April 4, Liu Zhenya was interviewed in Shenzhen by Global People, a publication under the People's Daily, detailing how she was "hunted down" by the DPP government. Liu Zhenya said, "This door started with me," but she said that Taiwan is "China's territory" and "Taiwan independence is a dead end."

On May 13, Liu Zhenya released a new video on Douyin for the first time since being deported to mainland China, claiming that Taiwan is a province of China and criticizing the DPP government for "not having the right to deport any Chinese person on Chinese soil." On November 13, the Quanzhou Public Security Bureau of Fujian issued a reward notice, determining that the report of Liu Zhenya's bullying and persecution of mainland spouses in Taiwan constituted the crime of inciting secession. On the same day, Liu Zhenya posted a video on Douyin saying "It's time for revenge." In January 2026, another mainland spouse from Guangdong called Guanguan, who made pro unification videos with content such as "the red flag will be planted all over Taiwan sooner or later", had her residency revoked.

== Official stances of both sides of the Taiwan Strait ==
=== People's Republic of China ===
In response to the Liu Zhenya incident, the Taiwan Affairs Office criticized the Democratic Progressive Party for being "hypocritical and double-standard" and hurting the feelings of compatriots at a regular press conference on March 12. It also described the internet celebrity Pa Chiung as "a petty scoundrel, a thief, an accomplice to evil, and will be severely punished". On March 26, Chen Binhua, spokesperson for the Taiwan Affairs Office, said at a press conference that the DPP authorities, who boast of "freedom, rule of law and human rights," abused judicial means to bully cross-strait marriage groups, causing family separation, which is contrary to human ethics and is immoral. At the same time, a "Taiwan independence henchman" reporting column was launched on the official website, which said that those reported would be held accountable according to law. The list includes Taiwanese Interior Minister Liu Shyh-fang, DPP legislators Puma Shen, Rosalia Wu, and Huang Jie, Taipei District Prosecutors Office prosecutors Lin Ta, Lin Chun-yen, and Lin Chun-ting, Kuma Academy's financial backer Robert Tsao, pro-DPP dentist Shih Shu-hua, internet celebrities Wen Tzu-yu (Ba Chiung) and Chen Po-yuan (Minnan Wolf PYC). Regarding the incident, Ministry of Foreign Affairs spokesperson Guo Jiakun stated "I have not paid attention to the relevant reports. Taiwan is an inseparable part of China's territory." On 8 January 2026, the Taiwan Affairs Office sanctioned Minister of the Interior Liu Shyh-fang as a "diehard "Taiwan independence" separatist" for "blatantly promoting separatist ‘Taiwan independence’ rhetoric", as well as "persecuting mainland spouses in Taiwan and actively creating obstacles to cross-strait personnel exchanges".

=== Republic of China ===
==== Government ====
On March 13, President Lai Ching-te stated that harming one's own country and people is not freedom of speech, but a criminal act regulated by the International Covenant on Civil and Political Rights. On March 17, Lin Da, a prosecutor at the Taipei District Prosecutors Office, stated that Taiwan's protection of freedom of speech is based on not undermining the existence of the Republic of China, saying that as long as the content of speech does not undermine the existence of the Republic of China, then speech can be protected. He also advocated that a special court for national security should be established as soon as possible, and a mechanism for military experts to participate in the review should be added. Premier Cho Jung-tai stated that there is no room for compromise on this matter. He said that there are limits to freedom of speech, and the existence of the country is the limit.

Mainland Affairs Council Minister Chiu Chui-cheng said that that any statement advocating military unification, war or the destruction of the Republic of China is not protected as free speech. On March 25, the Mainland Affairs Council issued a press release expressing its support for the competent authorities to handle the matter according to law, and called for respect for the sentiments of the Taiwanese people, not to stimulate social confrontation based on private interests, and hoped that no specific groups would be labeled. Regarding the list of "Taiwan independence henchmen," the MAC stated that the Chinese Communist Party (CCP)'s attempt to create the illusion of "long-arm jurisdiction" over Taiwan has no effect on the Taiwanese people and only obstructs and undermines cross-strait exchanges.

Regarding the handling of the Liu Zhenya incident, scholars such as Chen Pei-jer, an academician of the Academia Sinica, issued a statement on 26 March, saying that the space for freedom of speech in Taiwan has been compressed. Presidential Office spokesperson Guo Yahui responded that advocating for an aggressive war against Taiwan and hatred, has violated the criminal acts clearly defined in the International Covenant on Civil and Political Rights, which is a challenge to Taiwan's free and democratic system and also violates the red line of democracy and freedom of speech. Minister without Portfolio Lin Mingxin of the Executive Yuan stated that freedom of speech still needs certain restrictions, and emphasized that regulating speech with "penalties" is the last resort.

==== Political parties ====
Former Kuomintang vice presidential candidate Jaw Shaw-kong said in an interview on March 24 that it was a deliberate attempt to create a chilling effect. On March 25, Kuomintang Legislative Yuan caucus secretary-general Wang Hung-wei said that "What exactly are the government’s enforcement standards? Are mainland Chinese spouses being deported simply because the government dislikes what they say?", and accused the DPP of abandoning their commitment to freedom of speech. Taiwan People's Party legislator Chang Chi-kai said he did not want the National Immigration Agency or the Mainland Affairs Council to become the Taiwan Garrison Command. TPP politician Lee Chen-hsiu wrote that mainland spouses are like Jews during World War II. In response to Lee's statement, DPP China Department Director Wu Chun-chih refuted it as alarmist. Regarding the "Taiwan independence henchmen reporting column", the DPP China Department criticized that the CCP is the real troublemaker, crying "stop thief" when it is actually the thief.
