= Diehard "Taiwan independence" separatists =

Term used by the Chinese Communist Party

"Diehard 'Taiwan independence' separatists" (Chinese: "台独"顽固分子; pinyin: "Táidú" wángù fènzǐ) is a term used by the Chinese Communist Party (CCP) and the government of the People's Republic of China to refer to prominent supporters of Taiwan independence.

The Taiwan Affairs Office first published a list of organizations described as affiliated in 2022. The Chinese government has stated that individuals named on the list are subject to government sanctions and may be tried in absentia. Reported sanctions include lifelong criminal liability under the Anti-Secession Law, the Criminal Law and the National Security Law, and in some cases penalties up to and including the death penalty. Enterprises that donated to affiliated organizations were placed on a cooperation blacklist and their leaders were barred from entering China.

On 26 May 2024, the Supreme People's Court, the Supreme People's Procuratorate, the Ministry of Public Security, Ministry of State Security and the Ministry of Justice jointly issued the Guidelines on Imposing Criminal Punishments on Diehard "Taiwan independence" Separatists for Conducting or Inciting Secession, which set out the crimes, penalties, prosecution, and judicial procedures applicable to the Taiwan independence movement and to those identified as "die-hard 'Taiwan independence' elements".

== History ==
On 15 November 2020, Hong Kong Liaison Office's Ta Kung Pao quoted "authoritative sources" as saying that China is drafting a "list of die-hard pro-independence elements" and intends to "severely punish pro-Taiwan independence elements" and their supporters. This includes, but is not limited to, holding them accountable for life under the Anti-Secession Law, the Criminal Law and the National Security Law" for the "crime of secession".

On 18 November 2020, at a regular press conference of the Taiwan Affairs Office, in response to a reporter's inquiry about whether China was studying and formulating a list of "die-hard "Taiwan independence" elements", spokesperson Zhu Fenglian said that the actions of a "very small number of die-hard "Taiwan independence" elements" would not be tolerated. She said that the purpose of cracking down on these people and their financial backers is to "safeguard peace and stability in the Taiwan Strait and the interests of people on both sides of the Strait". Zhu also said that "the unification of the two sides of the Strait is an unstoppable trend. All die-hard "Taiwan independence" elements who are stubborn and refuse to see the truth will be condemned by the people and punished by history." On 25 November, Zhu Fenglian confirmed that a list of "die-hard "Taiwan independence" elements" was being studied and formulated, and said precise measures would be taken to crack down on "die-hard "Taiwan independence" elements" and their financial backers and other major supporters.

== List of diehard "Taiwan independence" separatists ==
Date	Individual/entity	Position when sanctioned	Restrictions			List type	Ref.
Date	Individual/entity	Position when sanctioned	Travel restrictions (Note: Sanctioned individuals and their immediate family members are prohibited from entering mainland China, Hong Kong, and Macau)	Prohibition on communication (Note: Mainland Chinese residents and institutions are prohibited from trading with sanctions individuals or from dealing with punished entities.)	Freezing of property (Note: Freezing property in mainland China)	List type	Ref.
5 November 2021	Su Tseng-chang	Premier of the Republic of China	Yes	Yes		(Note: The persons listed on the left are those who have been included in the list of "Taiwan independence diehards" by the Taiwan Affairs Office.)	(Note: In addition to the above, other measures include: restricting institutions affiliated with them from cooperating with relevant organizations and individuals in the mainland, never allowing companies affiliated with them and their financiers to make profits in the mainland, and taking other necessary disciplinary measures. Criminal liability will be pursued for life.)
5 November 2021	You Si-kun	President of the Legislative Yuan	Yes	Yes		(Note: The persons listed on the left are those who have been included in the list of "Taiwan independence diehards" by the Taiwan Affairs Office.)	(Note: In addition to the above, other measures include: restricting institutions affiliated with them from cooperating with relevant organizations and individuals in the mainland, never allowing companies affiliated with them and their financiers to make profits in the mainland, and taking other necessary disciplinary measures. Criminal liability will be pursued for life.)
5 November 2021	Joseph Wu	Minister of Foreign Affairs	Yes	Yes		(Note: The persons listed on the left are those who have been included in the list of "Taiwan independence diehards" by the Taiwan Affairs Office.)	(Note: In addition to the above, other measures include: restricting institutions affiliated with them from cooperating with relevant organizations and individuals in the mainland, never allowing companies affiliated with them and their financiers to make profits in the mainland, and taking other necessary disciplinary measures. Criminal liability will be pursued for life.)
3 August 2022	Taiwan Foundation for Democracy		Yes	Yes		(Note: The institutions listed on the left are included in the list of institutions affiliated with "Taiwan independence diehards" by the Taiwan Affairs Office.)	
3 August 2022	International Cooperation and Development Fund		Yes	Yes		(Note: The institutions listed on the left are included in the list of institutions affiliated with "Taiwan independence diehards" by the Taiwan Affairs Office.)	
3 August 2022	Xuande Energy		Yes	Yes		(Note: The institutions listed on the left are included in the enterprises that donated to institutions affiliated with "Taiwan independence diehards" list by the Taiwan Affairs Office.)	
3 August 2022	Lingwang Technology		Yes	Yes		(Note: The institutions listed on the left are included in the enterprises that donated to institutions affiliated with "Taiwan independence diehards" list by the Taiwan Affairs Office.)	
3 August 2022	Dawn Medical		Yes	Yes		(Note: The institutions listed on the left are included in the enterprises that donated to institutions affiliated with "Taiwan independence diehards" list by the Taiwan Affairs Office.)	
3 August 2022	SkyEye Satellite Technology		Yes	Yes		(Note: The institutions listed on the left are included in the enterprises that donated to institutions affiliated with "Taiwan independence diehards" list by the Taiwan Affairs Office.)	
16 August 2022	Hsiao Bi-khim	Taiwanese Representative in the U.S.	Yes	Yes			
16 August 2022	Wellington Koo	Secretary-General of the National Security Council	Yes	Yes			
16 August 2022	Tsai Chi-chang	Vice President of the Legislative Yuan	Yes	Yes			
16 August 2022	Ker Chien-ming	Majority Leader of the Legislative Yuan	Yes	Yes			
16 August 2022	Lin Fei-fan	Deputy Secretary-General of the Democratic Progressive Party	Yes	Yes			
16 August 2022	Chen Jiau-hua	Chairperson of the New Power Party	Yes	Yes			
16 August 2022	Wang Ting-yu	Member of the Legislative Yuan	Yes	Yes			
16 August 2022	Huang Yu-lin	Executive Director of the Taiwan Foundation for Democracy	Yes	Yes			
16 August 2022	Xiang Tianyi	Secretary General of the International Cooperation and Development Foundation	Yes	Yes			
7 April 2023	Prospect Foundation		Yes	Yes			
7 April 2023	Council of Asian Liberals and Democrats		Yes	Yes			
15 May 2024	Edward Huang	Current affairs commentator	Yes	Yes			
15 May 2024	Liu Bao-jie	Television host	Yes	Yes			
15 May 2024	Yu Beichen	Taoyuan City Councillor	Yes	Yes			
15 May 2024	Wang Yi-chuan	Executive Director of the Policy Committee of the Democratic Progressive Party	Yes	Yes			
15 May 2024	Lee Cheng-hao	Current affairs commentator	Yes	Yes			
14 October 2024	Robert Tsao	Founder of the United Microelectronics Corporation	Yes	Yes			
14 October 2024	Puma Shen	Member of the Legislative Yuan	Yes	Yes			
14 October 2024	Kuma Academy		Yes	Yes			
5 June 2025	Sicuens International			Yes			
7 January 2026	Liu Shyh-fang	Minister of the Interior	Yes	Yes			
7 January 2026	Cheng Ying-yao	Minister of Education	Yes	Yes			

== Other lists ==
=== Henchmen and accomplices of "Taiwan independence" ===
At 8:00 a.m. on 26 March 2025, the Taiwan Affairs Office launched the "Reporting Column on the Vicious Acts of 'Taiwan Independence' Henchmen and Accomplices in Persecuting Taiwan Compatriots" for reporting "the henchmen and accomplices of 'Taiwan independence' persecution of Taiwan compatriots". This column claims to be used to report "political dissidents and political parties, groups, and individuals on the island who support the peaceful development and integration of cross-strait relations" who are suppressed and persecuted by the Democratic Progressive Party (DPP) government, as well as "pro-independence organizations, pro-independence elements, public officials, and wing-based internet celebrities." On the same day, Chen Binhua, spokesperson for the Taiwan Affairs Office, said that the column had received 323 reports by 5:00 p.m. that day. He said that the reported individuals included Taiwanese Interior Minister Liu Shyh-fang, DPP legislators Puma Shen, Rosalia Wu, and Huang Jie, Taipei District Prosecutors Office prosecutors Lin Ta, Lin Chun-yen, and Lin Chun-ting, Kuma Academy's financial backer Robert Tsao, pro-DPP dentist Shih Shu-hua, internet celebrities Wen Tzu-yu (Ba Chiung) and Chen Po-yuan (Minnan Wolf PYC).

On 7 January 2026, Chen Binhua announced that Chen Shu-yi, a prosecutor at the Taiwan High Prosecutors Office, was listed as an accomplice of "Taiwan independence" and called her a "green judicial henchman". He said that she "persecuted Taiwanese people who support and participate in cross-strait exchanges and cooperation, and intimidated the Taiwanese people. Her actions were heinous and her crimes were serious".

List of henchmen and accomplices of "Taiwan independence"
Date	Name	Position when included
26 March 2025	Liu Shyh-fang	Minister of the Interior
26 March 2025	Puma Shen	Member of the Legislative Yuan
26 March 2025	Rosalia Wu	Member of the Legislative Yuan
26 March 2025	Huang Jie	Member of the Legislative Yuan
26 March 2025	Lin Ta	Prosecutor of the Taipei District Prosecutors Office
26 March 2025	Lin Chun-yen	Prosecutor of the Taipei District Prosecutors Office
26 March 2025	Lin Chun-ting	Prosecutor of the Taipei District Prosecutors Office
26 March 2025	Robert Tsao	Kuma Academy investor and founder of UMC
26 March 2025	Shih Shu-hua	Dentisit
26 March 2025	Wen Tzu-yu	YouTuber
26 March 2025	Chen Po-yuan	YouTuber, artist
7 January 2026	Chen Shu-yi	Prosecutor of the Taipei District Prosecutors Office

=== Taiwanese "talking heads" ===
On 15 May 2024, the Taiwan Affairs Office spokesperson Chen Binhua announced that the mainland would punish five Taiwanese commentators, Huang Shicong, Li Zhenghao, Wang Yichuan, Yu Beichen, and Liu Baojie, and their families. Chen Binhua said that out that "these so-called "commentators" in Taiwan disregarded the fact that the mainland was developing and progressing, and deliberately fabricated false and negative information about the mainland, including "the mainland people can't afford tea eggs" and "the mainland high-speed rail has no backrests," and spread them widely through television, the Internet, newspapers and other media". He continued by saying "their erroneous remarks deceived some people on the island, incited hostility and confrontation between the two sides of the Taiwan Strait, and hurt the feelings of compatriots on both sides of the Taiwan Strait".

=== "Taiwan independence" online army ===
On 17 March 2025, the official WeChat account of the Ministry of State Security named four alleged key members of Taiwan's Communication Electronic Force Command, established in June 2017. Their ID numbers and dates of birth were published, stating that they "executed cyber warfare orders issued by the DPP authorities", and carried out espionage, sabotage and anti-propaganda activities. The MSS said that since 2023, they have also spread false information on network social media platforms under the name of "Anonymous 64" organization. On 5 June 2025, the Tianhe Branch of the Guangzhou Municipal Public Security Bureau issued a wanted notice, publicly seeking the arrest of 20 members of the Communication Electronic Force Command, and disclosing their names, photos and Taiwan ID numbers.

On 10 October 2025, the Ministry of State Security WeChat account officially published information on three members of what it said was "Taiwan independence internet army", stating that "the DPP authorities secretly cultivated online 'water army' members to promote their 'Taiwan independence' separatist scheme, and they infiltrated various online social platforms at home and abroad to fabricate false information, spread 'Taiwan independence' separatist fallacies, and deliberately provoke cross-strait confrontation and undermine peace and stability in the Taiwan Strait." It said the three individuals disclosed were part of the Taiwan Wangshi Art & Design under the command of the Military Intelligence Bureau.

== Policies ==
According to information revealed at the regular press conference of the Taiwan Affairs Office on 5 November 2021, the authorities plan to implement a series of "punishments" on the individuals listed and will pursue their criminal liability for life. The punishments include: prohibiting them and their families from entering mainland China, Hong Kong and Macau, restricting their affiliated institutions from cooperating with relevant organizations and individuals in mainland China, and prohibiting their affiliated enterprises and financiers from seeking profits in mainland China, as well as other measures.

On 21 June 2024, the Taiwan Affairs Office and other departments held a joint special press conference to announce the Supreme People's Court, the Supreme People's Procuratorate, the Ministry of Public Security, the Ministry of State Security, and the Ministry of Justice jointly issued the Guidelines on Imposing Criminal Punishments on Diehard "Taiwan independence" Separatists for Conducting or Inciting Secession. The Guidelines stipulate that the crimes of separatism and inciting separatism shall be "applied to a very small number of "Taiwan independence" stubborn elements" who "organize, plan and implement separatist acts such as 'legal Taiwan independence', 'seeking independence by relying on foreign countries', and 'seeking independence by force'"; and those who "collude with foreign or overseas institutions, organizations and individuals to carry out crimes of separatism and inciting separatism" shall be punished more severely. The Guidelines also stipulate that if "Taiwan independence" stubborn elements voluntarily abandon their "Taiwan independence" separatist stance and no longer carry out "Taiwan independence" separatist activities, the case may be withdrawn and no prosecution may be initiated. It also says that a trial in absentia may be applied to cases of "Taiwan independence" elements who commit crimes of separatism and inciting separatism, with penalties up to and including capital punishment.

On 7 August 2024, the Taiwan Affairs Office the Ministry of Public Security added a special column on "Punishing 'Taiwan Independence' die-hards in accordance with the law". In addition to listing the die-hards of "Taiwan independence", the column also includes relevant statements by the spokesperson, legal documents, clues and crimes of the die-hards of "Taiwan independence" listed in the report list, and reports of new die-hards of "Taiwan independence" with serious crimes. There are five major sections in total.

=== Punishing companies ===
On 22 November 2021, Xinhua News Agency reported that the Far East Group's investments in Shanghai, Jiangsu, Jiangxi, Hubei and Sichuan were found to have committed "multiple illegal acts", and the company was fined 36.5 million renminbi, ordered to rectify within a time limit, and had idle construction land reclaimed as punishment. The Far East Group's subsidiaries were also required to pay fines and back taxes (the total fines and back taxes amounted to 474 million renminbi. According to the United Daily News, this may be related to Xu Xudong being a major donor for political donations. The Taiwan Affairs Office stated that it would not allow people who support Taiwan independence to make money on the mainland.

=== Criminal investigations ===
On 28 October 2025, the Chongqing Municipal Public Security Bureau initiated an investigation into Puma Shen for secession in accordance with the Criminal Law and the Guidelines on Imposing Criminal Punishments on Diehard "Taiwan independence" Separatists. On 13 November 2025, the Quanzhou Public Security Bureau of Fujian Province issued a reward notice for Ba Chiung and Minnan Lang, identifying them as having committed the crime of inciting secession.

== Reactions ==
When the list of three people was announced in November 2021, Taiwan's Mainland Affairs Council stated that it would not rule out reciprocal countermeasures. After Nancy Pelosi's visit to Taiwan in 2022 significantly increased the number of people on the list, the Mainland Affairs Council again expressed its strong protest and dissatisfaction, believing that this move was nothing more than an attempt to vent internal turmoil and intimidate Taiwan and the international community. On 27 June 2024, the Mainland Affairs Council announced that travel risks to mainland China and Hong Kong and Macau had been upgraded to an orange alert.

Miao Boya, a Taipei City Councilor from the Social Democratic Party, said that the measure taken by the Taiwan Affairs Office to these individuals from entering mainland China and the Hong Kong and Macau "proves that Taiwan is not part of China." She also said that "the People's Republic of China has never had any effective rule over Taiwan for even a second". Democratic Progressive Party legislator Lin Chun-hsien said that China seems to be addicted to sanctions, sanctioning Americans, then Europeans, and now it wants to sanction "Taiwan independence diehards". Eric Chu, chairman of the Kuomintang, said that the laws of mainland China do not extend to those of Taiwan, and that the two sides should communicate and respect each other. Former Kuomintang president Ma Ying-jeou said that mainland China should learn more about the political ecology of Taiwan before taking action, otherwise it may have the opposite effect. Ko Wen-je, chairman of the Taiwan People's Party and mayor of Taipei, said, "What's the point of talking about this? Usually, a few more calls will get higher poll numbers." Chang Chi-lu, a legislator from the TPP, said that the listing would have the opposite effect and would easily leave a bad impression on the Taiwanese people. Before being included on the list, Chen Jiau-hua, the chairwoman of the New Power Party, said that China's move was "not only absurd and unreasonable, but also a provocation of disputes".

Lin Yi-cheng, executive director of the Taiwan Constitutional Foundation, pointed out that China's publication of the list of die-hard pro-independence elements and the imposition of sanctions did not cause division and panic in Taiwanese society. Instead, these people congratulated each other on being "certified" by China as pro-Taiwan individuals and even rushed to line up for sanctions, which completely failed to achieve the expected effect. A spokesperson for the American Institute in Taiwan said that the United States "strongly condemns the use of escalating and destabilizing language by Chinese officials in their recent "legal guidelines" and urges the People's Republic of China to engage in meaningful dialogue with Taiwan". The institute said that "China's threats and legal pressure on Taiwan cannot peacefully resolve cross-strait differences". The AIT spokesperson noted that the United States "continues to urge all parties to exercise restraint and refrain from unilaterally changing the status quo. For decades, this status quo has maintained peace and stability in the Taiwan Strait and the entire region".
