= Guidelines on Imposing Criminal Punishments on Diehard "Taiwan independence" Separatists for Conducting or Inciting Secession =

2024 law in China

Guidelines on Imposing Criminal Punishments on Diehard "Taiwan independence" Separatists

Supreme People's Court Supreme People's Procuratorate Ministry of Public Security Ministry of State Security Ministry of Justice
- Enacted by: Supreme People's Court; Supreme People's Procuratorate; Ministry of Public Security; Ministry of State Security; Ministry of Justice
- Signed: 26 May 2024
- Effective: 21 June 2024

Related legislation
- Anti-Secession Law, Criminal Law of the People's Republic of China, Criminal Procedure Law of the People's Republic of China
- Status: In force

Guidelines on Imposing Criminal Punishments on Diehard "Taiwan independence" Separatists for Conducting or Inciting Secession
- Simplified Chinese: 关于依法惩治“台独”顽固分子分裂国家、煽动分裂国家犯罪的意见
- Traditional Chinese: 關於依法懲罰「台獨」頑固分子分裂國家、煽動分裂國家犯罪的意見
Transcriptions
Standard Mandarin
- Hanyu Pinyin: Guānyú Yīfǎ Chéngzhì "Táidú" Wángù Fènzǐ Fēnliè Guójiā, Shāndòng Fēnliè Guójiā Fànzuì de Yìjiàn

The Guidelines on Imposing Criminal Punishments on Diehard "Taiwan independence" Separatists, also known as the "22-Point Anti-Taiwan Independence Articles" or the "22-Point Punishment Articles", is a judicial opinion jointly issued by the Supreme People's Court, the Supreme People's Procuratorate, the Ministry of Public Security, the Ministry of State Security, and the Ministry of Justice of the People's Republic of China (PRC) on 26 May 2024. It specifies how the Taiwan independence movement is criminalized.

The Guidelines is a legally binding document formulated based on existing laws and regulations such as the Anti-Secession Law, the Criminal Law of the People's Republic of China, and the Criminal Procedure Law of the People's Republic of China. The Guidelines mainly target the matters related to cross-strait relations in what the PRC deems as the diehard "Taiwan independence" separatists and participants and organizers of the Taiwan independence movement.

The Guidelines stipulate the responsibilities that the judicial and law enforcement agencies of China should fulfill in the judicial process involving the Taiwan independence movement and the punishment of diehard "Taiwan independence" separatists. At the same time, it makes provisions on the crimes, penalties, prosecution and judicial procedures related to the Taiwan independence movement and diehard "Taiwan independence" separatists. The provisions mention that the most serious cases of Taiwan independence activism can be sentenced to death, and can also be tried in absentia.

== Criminal determination ==
According to the Guidelines, it clarifies the identification standards for two types of criminal crimes committed by "Taiwan Independence" stubborn elements, namely the crime of splitting the country and the crime of inciting splitting the country.

=== Crime of separatism ===
According to Article 2 of the Guidelines, anyone who organizes, plans, or carries out acts defined by the standards with the aim of splitting Taiwan from China shall be convicted and punished for the crime of splitting the country in accordance with Article 103, Paragraph 1 of the Criminal Law of the People's Republic of China; the standards for such determination are:

(1) Initiating and establishing "Taiwan independence" separatist organizations, planning and formulating "Taiwan independence" separatist action programs, plans and schemes, and directing members of "Taiwan independence" separatist organizations or other personnel to carry out activities to split the country and undermine national unity;

(2) Attempting to change the legal status of Taiwan as part of China by formulating, amending, interpreting, or abolishing relevant regulations of Taiwan or by holding "referendums";

(3) By promoting Taiwan's accession to international organizations that are limited to sovereign states or by engaging in official exchanges and military contacts with foreign countries, Taiwan attempts to create "two Chinas", "one China, one Taiwan" or "Taiwan independence" in the international community;

(4) Using one's position to distort or falsify the fact that Taiwan is part of China in the fields of education, culture, history, news media, etc., or to suppress political parties, groups, and individuals who support the peaceful development of cross-strait relations and national reunification;

(5) Other attempts to separate Taiwan from China.

The acts listed out in Article 2 carry a maximum penalty of death sentence. In addition, the Guidelines provide a detailed definition of the distinction between principal and accessory offenders in cases involving "organized crime", and the criteria for identification are as follows:

3. Those who play an organizing, planning, or commanding role in "Taiwan independence" separatist criminal groups shall be identified as "principal offenders" as stipulated in Article 103, Paragraph 1 of the Criminal Law.

4. Any act stipulated in Article 2 of this opinion that falls under any of the following circumstances shall be deemed a "serious crime" as defined in Article 103, Paragraph 1 of the Criminal Law:

(1) Directly involved in the main separatist activities of the "Taiwan independence" separatist organization;

(2) Those who engage in "Taiwan independence" separatist activities have serious consequences and adverse effects;

(3) Others who have played a significant role in "Taiwan independence" separatist activities.

5. Any of the following circumstances shall be deemed as "active participation" as stipulated in Article 103, Paragraph 1 of the Criminal Law for engaging in the conduct specified in Article 2 of this Opinion:

(1) Participated in the separatist activities of "Taiwan independence" separatist organizations on multiple occasions;

(2) Those who play a key role in "Taiwan independence" separatist organizations;

(3) Actively assisting the ringleaders in carrying out organizational and leadership activities within "Taiwan independence" separatist organizations;

(4) Other active participants.

=== Crime of inciting separatism ===
According to Article 7 of the Guidelines, those who make identifications with the aim of splitting Taiwan from China shall be convicted and punished for the crime of inciting separatism accordance with Article 103, Paragraph 1 of the Criminal Law of the People's Republic of China; the criteria for identification are as follows:

(1) Those who stubbornly promote the "Taiwan independence" separatist proposition and its separatist action program, plan, and scheme; (2) Other acts that incite Taiwan to separate from China.

In addition, Article 8 of the Guidelines provides a detailed definition of the distinction between principal and accessory offenders in cases involving "organized crime," and the criteria for identification are as follows:

If the conduct stipulated in Article 7 of this opinion is serious, causes serious consequences, or has a particularly adverse impact, it shall be deemed as a "serious crime" as stipulated in Article 103, Paragraph 2 of the Criminal Law.

== Application ==
If individuals suspected of separatism or inciting separatism crimes are outside mainland China, the Guidelines state that if the public security or state security organs have transferred the case for prosecution, and the procuratorate finds that the facts of the crime are clear, a public prosecution may be initiated in the people's courts upon the approval of the Supreme People's Procuratorate, with the people's court then reviewing if the case meets the criteria for the individual to be tried in absentia.

== Statute of limitations ==
The statute of limitations for the two types of crimes identified in the Guidelines is set in accordance with the Criminal Law of the People's Republic of China. According to Articles 87, 88, and 89 of the Criminal Law and the provisions on crimes endangering national security, the statute of limitations varies depending on the circumstances of the crime. Taking the "principal offender" or "serious crime" in the criteria identified in the Guidelines as an example, the statute of limitations for inciting separatism is 15 years, and the statute of limitations for separatism is 20 years; however, when the circumstances of the crime are particularly heinous, the consequences are particularly serious, and criminal responsibility must be pursued according to law, even if the 20-year statute of limitations has expired, the prosecution can still be carried out in accordance with the law after being approved by the Supreme People's Procuratorate. In addition, the Guidelines clearly stipulate a special situation in which no statute of limitations is set:

Those who evade investigation or trial after a case has been filed by public security organs or national security organs, or after a case has been accepted by the people's court, are not subject to the statute of limitations.

Regarding the calculation method for the statute of limitations, in cases where "the criminal acts of 'Taiwan independence' diehards who split the country or incite the split are continuous or ongoing," the statute of limitations is calculated from the date the criminal act ends.

== Reactions ==
=== Mainland China ===
At a joint press conference on the release of the Guidelines, Taiwan Affairs Office spokesperson Chen Binhua said that "It is reasonable, justified and legal to punish diehard "Taiwan independence" elements for splitting the country and inciting the crime of splitting the country in accordance with the law." He also said that the relevant measures only target a very small number of people and their criminal acts, and do not involve the vast majority of Taiwanese people. On 7 August, the Taiwan Affairs Office added a column on its official website entitled "Punishing diehard Taiwan independence elements in accordance with the law" and published a reporting email address to collect clues about Taiwan independence crimes. The column listed 10 people in the "List of diehard Taiwan independence elements" on the website, including Su Tseng-chang, You Si-kun, Joseph Wu, Hsiao Bi-khim, Wellington Koo, Tsai Chi-chang, Ker Chien-ming, Lin Fei-fan, Chen Jiau-hua, and Wang Ting-yu.

=== Taiwan ===
Taiwanese President Lai Ching-te stated regarding the Guidelines that "democracy is not a crime, but autocracy is evil." He emphasized that China has no right to sanction the people of Taiwan, nor does it have the right to extraterritorially target the people of Taiwan.

On June 27, 2024, the Mainland Affairs Council stated that the mainland, Hong Kong and Macau have amended national security laws in recent years. It said that recently, there have been cases of Taiwanese people being detained and interrogated when they travel to the mainland. The Mainland Affairs Council said that it believes that the Guidelines will seriously threaten the personal safety of Taiwanese people traveling to the mainland, Hong Kong and Macau. It said that, after assessment, it is deemed necessary to raise the travel warning for the mainland, Hong Kong and Macau to "orange" from 27 June, and advise Taiwanese people to avoid unnecessary travel.

Kuomintang Chairman Eric Chu responded that mainland China has no jurisdiction over the Republic of China or any of the people of Taiwan. He said that "what we see recently is a spiral of hostility between the two sides constantly rising, which is the most unfortunate development. We hope that both sides will exercise restraint. Any spiral of hostility will only cause conflict. The cost of conflict caused by confrontation is far too high compared to dialogue. We still hope that dialogue will replace confrontation." Kuomintang legislator-at-large Ko Chih-en also said that "Taiwan is a sovereign and independent country. If the Taiwan Affairs Office wants to express friendly relations with Taiwan, it should first extend an olive branch. It should not use such words. The people of Taiwan will not welcome it." Lin Yu-chang said he still believes that "if we want to maintain peace between the two sides, the Taiwan Affairs Office of the Central Committee of the Chinese Communist Party should not provoke the people of Taiwan with its words and statements, because this will not make everyone feel that there is a way to promote peace between the two sides."

The Democratic Progressive Party (DPP) China Department issued a press release stating that Taiwan is a sovereign and independent country, that the Republic of China and the People's Republic of China are not subordinate to each other, and the CCP has never ruled Taiwan for a single day. It said "the 22 "opinions on punishing independence" unilaterally announced by the Chinese government have no jurisdiction or legal effect over Taiwan, and "totalitarian China" has no right to "punish" democratic Taiwan."

Ko Wen-je, chairman of the Taiwan People's Party, responded, "We often say that the Communist Party is a pig teammate of Taiwan. The CCP often wonders why, despite giving Taiwan a bunch of preferential policies, Taiwanese people are running further and further away. That's how it is. Why do we do this all the time? Do you think that if you say this, Taiwanese people will be afraid? Or will they move closer to the mainland? No, this action will only make Taiwanese people run further away, and even get closer and closer to the United States. Isn't that right?"

The New Power Party (NPP) Central Committee issued a press release stating that "for the Chinese government, Taiwan's freedom and democracy are itself heinous crimes". The NPP stated that it would "warn the Chinese government that verbal attacks and military intimidation of the Taiwanese people could not change the fact that Taiwan and China are not subordinate to each other, nor could it shake Taiwan's determination to insist on independence and autonomy." It also called on the three parties in the Legislative Yuan to submit a cross-party statement at the plenary session to jointly condemn the Chinese government's encroachment. Party Chairwoman Claire Wang also stated that "only in a democratic Taiwan can there be free individuals. In a totalitarian China, there will only be distorted slaves. The more it bares its teeth and claws and threatens, the less it can stop the Taiwanese people's indifference and beauty."

=== United States ===
The US State Department spokesman Matthew Miller said the United States strongly condemns the "escalating and destabilizing rhetoric and actions of officials of the People's Republic of China. The United States continues to urge restraint and not to unilaterally change the status quo, and calls on the People's Republic of China to engage in meaningful dialogue with Taiwan. Threats and legal battles cannot peacefully resolve cross-strait differences." On June 25, Foreign Ministry spokesperson Mao Ning responded to Miller's condemnation of the Guidelines at a press conference, expressing strong dissatisfaction and firm opposition to the relevant remarks by the US side, saying that "no external force has the right to make irresponsible remarks about this."
