= Cheng Ying-yao =

Taiwanese academic administrator

- 鄭英耀
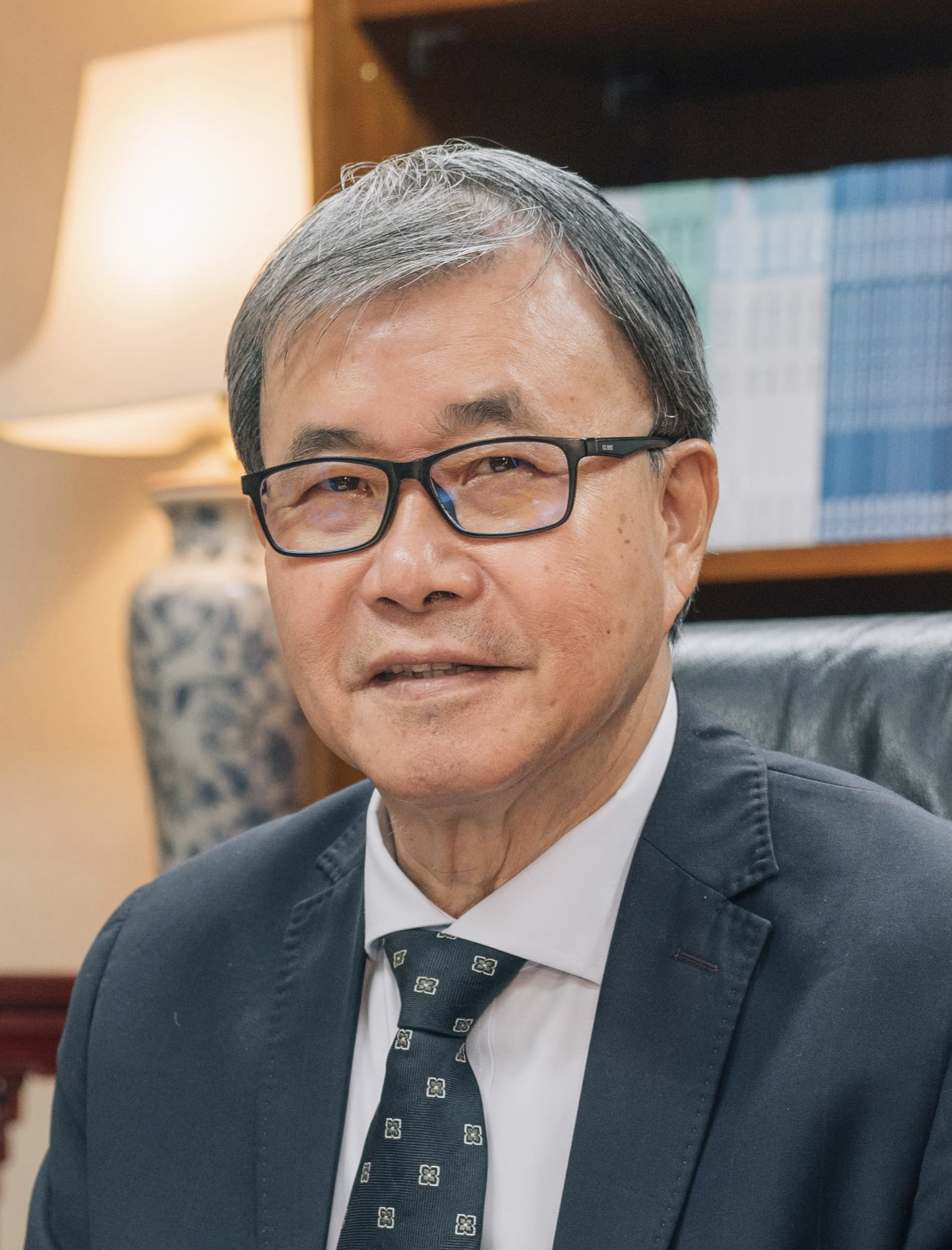
- Official portrait, 2024

31st Minister of Education
- Incumbent
- Assumed office 20 May 2024
- Prime Minister: Cho Jung-tai
- Preceded by: Pan Wen-chung

7th President of National Sun Yat-sen University
- In office 1 August 2016 – 20 May 2024
- Preceded by: Wu Chi-hua (acting)
- Succeeded by: Kuo Chih-wen (acting)

Personal details
- Born: 12 October 1955 (age 70) Penghu County, Taiwan
- Party: Independent
- Education: National Pingtung University (BEd); National Kaohsiung Normal University (MEd); National Chengchi University (PhD)

Cheng Ying-yao (Chinese: 鄭英耀; born 12 October 1955) is a Taiwanese academic administrator who has served as the Minister of Education since 2024.

== Early life and education ==
Cheng was raised in Penghu. After graduating from the Pingtung Normal College, he worked as an elementary school teacher. He then earned a master's degree in education from National Kaohsiung Normal University in 1985 and earned his Ph.D. in education from National Chengchi University in 1992. His doctoral dissertation was titled, "A study on elementary school teachers' creative thinking, critical thinking and related factors" (Chinese: 國小教師創造思考､批判思考及其相關因素之研究).

== Academic career ==
Cheng began his career at National Sun Yat-sen University in 1985, first as a professor and successively serving as the dean of students and social sciences before assuming the university presidency. During his presidential tenure, Cheng in 2019 proposed that NSYSU merge with Kaohsiung Medical University. The following year, Cheng commented on, then penned an open letter about, the university's handling of plagiarism allegations against alumnae Li Mei-jhen. In 2022, NSYSU became the first university in Taiwan to offer mental health leave to its students, and inaugurated the College of Semiconductor and Advanced Technology Research.

== Political career ==
In the mid-2000s, Cheng headed the Kaohsiung City Government's Bureau of Education. He later served two terms as leader of the Democratic Progressive Party-affiliated New Frontier Foundation.

Cheng was named Minister of Education in Cho Jung-tai's incoming cabinet on 12 April 2024. At the time of his appointment to the Executive Yuan, Cheng held no party affiliation.

On 8 January 2026, Cheng was sanctioned by the Taiwan Affairs Office of the People's Republic of China as a "diehard "Taiwan independence" separatist" for "organising the compilation of ‘Taiwan independence’ textbooks, poisoning the minds of young people on the island and obstructing cross-strait educational exchanges and cooperation".
