= Tsao Hsing-cheng–Shen Chun-shan Go match donation controversy =

Taiwanese political controversy

The Shen Chun-shan one-game fundraising incident occurred in October 1995, when Shen Chun-shan, then president of National Tsing Hua University, requested a donation from Tsao Hsing-cheng, also known as Robert Tsao, chairman of United Microelectronics Corporation, for the university. The two men agreed to settle the matter through a game of Go, after which Tsao decided to donate NT$15 million to National Tsing Hua University. Witnessed by journalist Chang Tso-chin and others, the donation agreement was formally signed in May 1996. The event was subsequently reported by United Daily News and became widely regarded as a celebrated anecdote during Shen's later years and after his death.

In 2025, during the 2025 Taiwanese mass electoral recall campaign, Tsao Hsing-cheng became the lead petitioner. Kuomintang legislator Weng Hsiao-ling then alleged in a Facebook post that Tsao had failed to fulfill his promised donation to National Tsing Hua University. The university stated to reporters that it had no record of receiving the donation, bringing the matter back into the news. Tsao, however, maintained that he had already delivered the donation to Shen Chun-shan.

== Background ==
=== Go match and donation ===
In October 1995, in order to raise funds for National Tsing Hua University, Shen Chun-shan, then president of the university, solicited a donation from Robert Tsao , chairman of United Microelectronics Corporation, during a banquet organized by the Friends of Tsing Hua Association. Tsao, believing that he had no reason to donate because he was an alumnus of National Chiao Tung University, proposed a Go challenge to Shen as a justification for making a donation. Tsao suggested that the amount of the donation be determined by the result of the game, with NT$10,000 donated for each point lost. Since Shen was the stronger player, the game began with a three-stone handicap. Tsao resigned midway through the game, and Shen won by resignation. The final margin was fifty points. Shen initially thought that the wager was NT$10,000 per point, but Tsao eventually decided to donate US$10,000 per point. Using an exchange rate of NT$30 to US$1, Tsao announced that he would donate NT$15 million to National Tsing Hua University.

On 5 May 1996, Shen Chun-shan invited Academia Sinica president Lee Yuan-tseh, United Daily News editor-in-chief Chang Tso-chin, and others to attend the university anniversary banquet organized by the Friends of Tsing Hua Association as witnesses. According to Chang's recollections, Tsao Hsing-cheng and Shen Chun-shan, representing UMC and National Tsing Hua University respectively, signed an agreement under the pretext of a cooperative project, thereby completing the donation arrangement. The incident was reported by United Daily News on 6 May. United Daily News published another report on 10 May, stating that after the 6 May article appeared, someone reported Shen Chun-shan to the Hsinchu District Prosecutors Office on suspicion of gambling. After questioning Shen, prosecutors decided not to indict him. The incident was later recounted in a memoir article published by Chang Tso-chin on Sin Chew Daily's website on 20 May 2011, and was also included in his memoir Gu Nian Gai Sheng: Memoirs of Journalist Chang Tso-chin. Volume I of Shen Chun-shan Talks About Stories of Go Masters records Shen's recollection of receiving Tsao's donation during an interview with children in 2003.

During the "Infinite Wishes – Masters Dialogue Cultural Collection" event on 3 June 2011, then university president Chen Li-junstated in his speech that National Tsing Hua University had already received Tsao Hsing-cheng's NT$15 million donation. Hsu Ming-te, a Tsing Hua alumnus and former director of the university's Office of Financial Planning, also mentioned Tsao's NT$15 million donation in an article published in the National Tsing Hua University Alumni Newsletter in 2014.

Following Shen Chun-shan's death in 2018, the memorial collection produced by National Tsing Hua University, as well as contemporary news reports, cited the incident. The story was also included in Chronology of Shen Chun-shan, edited by Commonwealth Publishing Group. In 2019, the National Tsing Hua University Library published a photograph of the two men playing Go in 1995, citing the memorial collection.

=== Use of the donation ===
Professor Yen Huang-che of the Department of Physics at National Tsing Hua University died of stomach cancer in 1995, and his family donated NT$5 million to the department. According to a report published by United Daily News on 6 May 1996, President Shen Chun-shan allocated part of Tsao Hsing-cheng's donation as matching funds to establish the Yen Huang-che Memorial Lecture, modeled after the Christmas Lectures of the Royal Society in the United Kingdom. The lectures were intended to invite distinguished professionals to give popular science lectures to secondary school students and the general public, with four lectures planned annually. On 5 May 1996, the inaugural Yen Huang-che Popular Science Lecture was held, with Academia Sinica president Lee Yuan-tseh delivering the first lecture, entitled "Lasers and Chemistry". Yang Chen-ning and Shiing-Shen Chern were later expected to give lectures as well.

In the 1996 Memorial Collection for Professor Yen Huang-che, Shen Chun-shan mentioned the establishment of the Yen Huang-che Memorial Lecture in terms consistent with the report in United Daily News. He explained that the lecture expenses were initially paid out of discretionary funds already raised by the university president and that a separate endowment would later be established. In response to the United Daily News report of 6 May 1996, National Tsing Hua University stated on 25 February 2025 that only the funds donated by Yen's family had been used to finance the lectures and denied that Tsao Hsing-cheng's donation had ever been used for the Yen Huang-che Memorial Lecture.

== Subsequent controversy ==
On 24 February 2025, Kuomintang legislator Weng Hsiao-ling accused Tsao Hsing-cheng of failing to fulfill his promised NT$15 million donation, alleging that the payment had been outstanding for thirty years. National Tsing Hua University confirmed on the same day that it had not received the money. Tsao responded by stating that he had delivered the donation to Shen Chun-shan in the form of a check and had not concerned himself with how it was used. Weng argued that Tsao's statement implied that Shen had embezzled the donation and demanded that the university condemn Tsao.

According to the university's Digital History Museum website, then president Chen Li-junstated on 3 June 2011, during the "Infinite Wishes – Masters Dialogue Cultural Collection" event, that National Tsing Hua University had received Tsao Hsing-cheng's NT$15 million donation. In response, the university reiterated on 25 February that it had in fact never received the donation.University officials privately told reporters from the Central News Agency that the story had long been regarded within educational circles as a celebrated anecdote and that no detailed records of the donation had ever been found. Chen Li-jun later told China Times that he had thanked Tsao in his speech because Tsao had privately told him that he had made the donation. He admitted that he had not verified the matter and that his remarks should not be regarded as proof. Chen further stated that the university had already determined several years earlier, when inviting Tsao to give a lecture, that no donation had been made, and that this was not a new discovery resulting from the controversy

National Tsing Hua University stated that it had repeatedly, both directly and indirectly, requested donations from Tsao Hsing-cheng but had never received any payment. The university maintained that it had no record of receiving the donation and no record of any check. University officials agreed to speak to reporters only anonymously, and no one was willing to publicly verify the matter. The university further stated that it would make no additional comments.

On 28 February 2025, National Tsing Hua University president Kao Wei-yuan issued an internal letter stating that, in order to protect donors' privacy, the university would not proactively disclose donation-related information unless requested by the donor concerned.

=== Donation method ===
In response to National Tsing Hua University's allegation that Tsao Hsing-cheng had failed to fulfill his promised donation, Tsao initially stated that the donation had been delivered directly to President Shen Chun-shan by check in the year the pledge was made.

According to technology journalist Lin Hung-wen, former United Microelectronics Corporation general manager Wu Hung-jen explained in 2025 that the donation had actually been made by UMC itself. The payment was made under the name of a cooperative project between the two parties and was not donated entirely under Tsao Hsing-cheng's personal name. He stated that National Tsing Hua University had only checked records of donations made in Tsao's personal capacity, which led the university to conclude that no payment had been received.

Reporters from Business Today interviewed staff members who had handled the matter at National Tsing Hua University at the time. According to them, the donation had been made through the UMC Education and Culture Foundation over a five-year period, with NT$15 million each being donated to National Tsing Hua University and National Chiao Tung University.

In a personal statement, Tsao Hsing-cheng stated that the donation had been made in UMC's name and that he had never promised to make it in his own name. Following this donation, UMC hired two former presidents of National Tsing Hua University as independent directors. When the university built the College of Electrical Engineering and Computer Science Building (now the Liu Chung-laung Hall), UMC donated NT$150 million. UMC also donated NT$100 million toward the construction of Chun-Shan Hall. Tsao questioned whether National Tsing Hua University, by cooperating with Weng Hsiao-ling in making accusations against him, had been infiltrated by the Chinese Communist Party.
