= Li Mei-jhen thesis controversy =

2020 Taiwan plagiarism scandal

The Li Mei-jhen thesis controversy refers to an incident during the 2020 Kaohsiung mayoral by-election, in which Li Mei-jhen, the Kuomintang (KMT) candidate for the 2020 Kaohsiung mayoral by-election, was exposed for plagiarism in her master’s thesis, “An Analysis of Taiwan’s Trade with Mainland China,” submitted to National Sun Yat-sen University (NSYSU). The thesis was found to have copied the works of others, after which Li voluntarily announced that she would relinquish the master’s degree.

On August 19, NSYSU decided to revoke her master’s degree, and on October 13, the revocation was formally announced in accordance with the Degree Conferral Act.

In January 2022, the Qiaotou District Prosecutors Office indicted Li for violating the Copyright Act.

In April 2022, Li Mei-jhen reached a settlement with the plaintiff. The incident triggered widespread scrutiny of the legitimacy of academic credentials held by political figures, as well as extensive discussion regarding failures in quality control within higher education. In addition to Li Mei-jhen herself, the controversy also implicated disputes surrounding President Tsai Ing-wen's doctoral degree from the London School of Economics, as well as allegations of plagiarism involving Miaoli County Magistrate Hsu Yao-chang's master’s thesis and Hsinchu City legislator Cheng Cheng-chien's doctoral dissertation.

== Background ==
Kaohsiung mayor Han Kuo-yu was removed from office following a successful recall vote on June 6, 2020. Consequently, the Central Election Commission scheduled a by-election for August 15, 2020.

On June 23, 2020, the Kuomintang decided to nominate Kaohsiung City Councilor Li Mei-jhen as its candidate for the by-election. Li ultimately chose to run while remaining in office, without taking a leave of absence.

== Course of events ==
On July 20, 2020, Wu Pei-jung, former associate researcher of the Transitional Justice Commission, revealed that Li Mei-jhen’s July 2008 master’s thesis, “An Analysis of Taiwan’s Trade with Mainland China,” submitted to the Institute of Mainland China Studies (now the Institute of China and Asia-Pacific Studies) at National Sun Yat-sen University, contained four pages copied verbatim from an article titled “Cross-Strait Political and Economic Interaction,” published in May 2005 by Tong Chen-yuan, current chairman of the Overseas Community Affairs Council, in the Newsletter of the Center for China Studies at National Chengchi University.

NSYSU responded that it would handle the complaint and conduct an investigation.

Huang Tzu-che, deputy director of the KMT’s Culture and Communications Committee, attempted to defend Li, stating: “If one were to plagiarize, one would plagiarize the entire book, not just those four pages.”

Li Mei-jhen apologized, stating that portions of her thesis may not have properly cited reference chapters.

On July 22, Mirror Weekly conducted further comparisons and found that 96% of Li’s entire thesis had been plagiarized from Lei Cheng-ru’s master’s thesis, “An Analysis of the Evolution of Cross-Strait Economic and Trade Interaction and Taiwanese Business Investment,” published in 2000 at National Taipei University.

Li held her first press conference regarding the matter, during which she harshly criticized President Tsai Ing-wen, claiming that Tsai’s doctoral dissertation was the one surrounded by doubts, and asserted that theses should be scrutinized equally. She stated that “if President Tsai responds,” she would respond by the same standard, and added, “Now I finally understand why Hsu Kun-yuan jumped from the 17th floor.” She then left abruptly after one minute. Politicians from both the pan-blue and pan-green camps criticized her remarks as an attempt to evade responsibility.

On the same day, NSYSU reiterated that "if plagiarism is confirmed and approved, an announcement of revocation will be posted on the university website, written notice will be issued to recover the degree certificate, and notifications will be sent to the National Central Library and the university library to remove both physical and digital copies of the thesis."

Students of NSYSU initiated a joint petition among students and alumni demanding a thorough investigation.

NSYSU President Cheng Ying-yao stated that any supervising professors found to have been negligent would be reviewed by the Faculty Evaluation Committee.

Chu Ching-peng, then vice president of National Dong Hwa University, stated that the incident occurred long ago and that he had no recollection of Li’s oral defense, but expressed willingness to cooperate with the investigation.

The New Power Party called on the Kuomintang to withdraw Li Mei-jhen’s nomination and apologize to the citizens of Kaohsiung.

On July 23, Li Mei-jhen held a second press conference, announcing that she would relinquish her master’s degree, and again apologized for the harm caused to her alma mater and others by the thesis controversy. She stated that she would apply to the Kaohsiung City Election Commission to remove the wording “Master’s degree from National Sun Yat-sen University” from the academic credentials section of the election bulletin.

During this period, Li’s campaign team was divided over whether to issue a public apology or downplay the matter. Media recordings captured KMT Secretary-General Lee Chien-lung whispering to Chiang that “Li Mei-jhen is out of control.” Chiang argued that plagiarism exceeding 96% could not convince voters and that the controversy should not be allowed to further damage the campaign, and therefore called Li to urge her to publicly apologize and voluntarily relinquish her degree.

The Kaohsiung City Election Commission responded that due to the large volume of printed election bulletins and their completion the following day, reprinting was not possible.

On July 24, NSYSU convened a preliminary review committee, which initially concluded that Li’s thesis content was “highly similar to others' works,” and stated that a final determination would be made within one month.

On July 25, at the inauguration of her campaign headquarters, Li claimed that it was not Johnny Chiang who had pressured her to “cut losses and survive,” but rather her role as a mother wishing to set an example for her children by admitting mistakes and correcting them. She stated: “You misunderstood. I just thought that as a mother, I don’t want my children to stubbornly argue when they make mistakes. I want them to know how to admit and correct errors, so I must lead by example.”

She also mentioned that when her Democratic Progressive Party opponent Chen Chi-mai first ran for legislator, she was only sixteen years old, and worried that her name recognition could not match his. She then stated that she now felt “famous,” claiming “my wishes have come true; I am now the most well-known person in the country,” and criticized the DPP for allegedly relying on smear tactics, stating that the incident was an attempt to destroy her "fresh image."

On August 3, Li attended the Kaohsiung Youth Democracy Alliance Student Forum titled “Incorporating Student Opinions into Municipal Planning.” When asked by students whether the thesis was written by herself or plagiarized, she stated that she had never hired ghostwriters, admitted to taking shortcuts, and emphasized that classmates had shared materials without verifying sources, asserting that plagiarism was not intentional.

On August 19, NSYSU announced that following reviews by three external experts and two internal review committees, the College of Social Sciences unanimously voted that Li Mei-jhen's thesis involved serious plagiarism, and resolved to revoke her master’s degree in accordance with relevant degree-conferral regulations.

On October 13, NSYSU formally announced the revocation of her master’s degree in accordance with the Degree Conferral Act.

On January 13, 2022, the Qiaotou District Prosecutors Office indicted Li Mei-jhen for violating the Copyright Act.

In April 2022, Li Mei-jhen reached a settlement with Lei Cheng-ru.

== Public commentary ==
Liang Wen-chieh, a DPP Taipei City Councilor, pointed out that Li's thesis advisor Lin De-chang had served as a KMT Central Committee member, while oral defense committee member Chu Ching-peng was a KMT-designated Central Standing Committee member and former deputy magistrate of Hualien County, stating that "basically, they are all from the same group."

Chu responded in an interview with FTV, stating that he was unaware of Li's background and that academia should be non-partisan, adding that the incident had "taught him a lesson."

Former New Power Party legislator Huang Kuo-chang criticized Li, stating: "This is no longer merely an issue of academic ethics or lack of integrity. It is a criminal act violating the Copyright Act."

On July 23, Chang Hsien-chao, director of the Institute of China and Asia-Pacific Studies at NSYSU, stated in an exclusive interview with the Central News Agency that the incident was distressing and regrettable, but that academic work must continue and future thesis reviews would be more rigorous. Matters concerning Li's advisor Lin De-chang would be addressed uniformly by the university.

Essayist and retired professor Liao Yu-hui of the Department of Language and Creative Writing at National Taipei University of Education criticized Li on Facebook, stating that Li had no standing to “relinquish” the degree, and that only revocation by the awarding institution would be legitimate. She further stated that if Li were sincerely remorseful, she should say: “I sincerely accept National Sun Yat-sen University’s decision to revoke my degree, and I apologize for the serious damage caused to the university’s reputation.”

On July 24, political commentator Wen Lang-dong accused Lin De-chang of acting as an academic intermediary for China to recruit Taiwanese students, claiming that Lin's leniency toward Li’s copy-and-paste thesis was intended to consolidate pan-blue networks and pursue a higher-ranking role as a comprador for China. On July 25, Hou Yu-ih, KMT mayor of New Taipei City, stated that Li should humbly accept criticism and apologize.

Former KMT legislator Lo Shu-lei stated that grassroots party members in Kaohsiung were deeply embarrassed by having to campaign for Li.

Pan-blue media figure Jaw Shaw-kong speculated that the plagiarism was likely exposed by members within the KMT, as Chen Chi-mai had already led Li by a large margin in polls, leaving the DPP with little incentive to pursue the matter.

Commentator Lee Cheng-hao noted that a poll conducted by the pro-KMT United Daily News showed only 14% approval of Li'fffs handling of the issue, and suggested that she should withdraw from the election to minimize damage to the party

Taipei Mayor Ko Wen-je described the situation with a single word: "tragic," and joked regarding allegations of ghostwriting: "If you’re going to hire a ghostwriter, at least hire a diligent one."On July 26, former Central Police University professor and KMT legislator Yeh Yu-lan stated on Facebook that if Li's thesis had problems, "her advisor bears more responsibility than anyone else for reminding her."

== Subsequent impact ==
On July 26, 2020, NSYSU President Cheng Ying-yao issued an open letter to faculty, students, and alumni, lamenting that “some people do not cherish their reputations,” stating that the plagiarism case had damaged the university’s reputation. He emphasized that the investigation team would operate independently within the scope of legal authorization, and that regulations would be promptly amended if insufficient. He also stated that meetings would be convened to review the operation of in-service master’s programs, strictly vet oral defense committee lists, review advisor-to-student ratios, and consider replacing research theses with technical reports for in-service and continuing education programs.

On July 27, the Ministry of Education introduced the so-called “Li Mei-jhen Clause,” comprising eight mechanisms aimed at strengthening quality assurance for university theses. These included requiring advisors and departments to assume corresponding responsibility, reducing enrollment quotas as penalties, and planning the development of a domestic thesis comparison system.

Director-General Chu Chun-chang of the Department of Higher Education stated: "If, after the Ministry’s requirements, schools still fail to improve or take action, the Ministry of Education will step in to handle the matter." He further emphasized that "if fabrication, alteration, plagiarism, ghostwriting, or other fraudulent conduct is confirmed, the degree must be revoked and the certificate publicly annulled."

On October 12, the first court hearing was held regarding Lei Cheng-ru’s lawsuit against Li for plagiarism. Lei’s attorney stated that the lawsuit was filed because Li failed to properly address the aftermath of the plagiarism.

On October 13, NSYSU formally notified the Ministry of Education of the revocation of Li's master’s degree. Li criticized NSYSU President Cheng Ying-yao for having a clear political stance.

In response, Wu Pei-jung stated that her values and sense of justice had been severely violated, while Chu Hsueh-heng stated that the revocation did not make the plagiarism disappear.

On January 13, 2022, the Qiaotou District Prosecutors Office indicted Li Mei-jhen for violating the Copyright Act.

In April 2022, Li Mei-jhen reached a settlement with Lei Cheng-ru.
