= Puma Shen =

Taiwanese politician and lawyer (born 1982)

Shen Pao-yang
- 沈伯洋
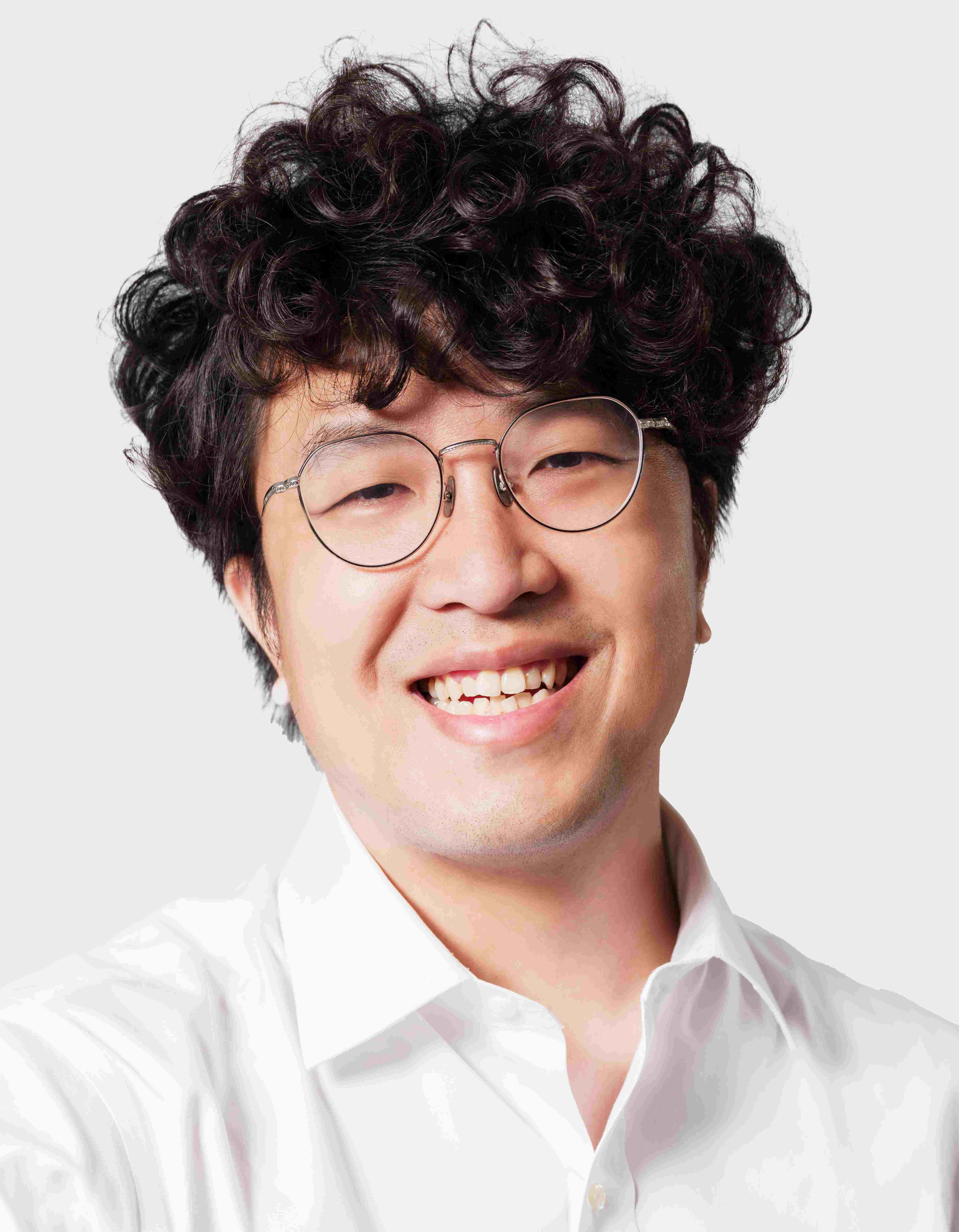
- Official portrait, 2024

Member of the Legislative Yuan
- Incumbent
- Assumed office 1 February 2024
- Constituency: National At-Large

Personal details
- Born: June 7, 1982 (age 44) Taipei, Taiwan
- Party: Democratic Progressive Party
- Education: National Taiwan University (LLB, LLM); University of Pennsylvania (LLM); University of California, Irvine (PhD)
- Scientific career
- Fields: Criminology
- Thesis: Local Ideologies and Punishment for White-Collar Crime: A Comparison Between the U.S. and China (2017)
- Doctoral advisor: Henry Pontell; Elliott Currie
- Other academic advisors: Peter Navarro; Jeffrey Wasserstrom

Chinese name
- Chinese: 沈伯洋
Transcriptions
Standard Mandarin
- Hanyu Pinyin: Shěn Bóyáng
Southern Min
- Hokkien POJ: Sím Pek-iûⁿ

Shen Pao-yang (Chinese: 沈伯洋; pinyin: Shěn Bóyáng; born 7 June 1982), also known as Puma Shen, is a Taiwanese politician and criminologist who has served as a member of the Legislative Yuan since 2024. A member of the Democratic Progressive Party (DPP), he was elected as a member of its party-list. He is the DPP's nominee for the 2026 Taipei mayoral election, challenging incumbent mayor Chiang Wan-an.

After graduating from National Taiwan University in 2004, Shen earned his doctorate in criminology and sociology from the University of California, Irvine in 2017. He then became a professor of criminology at National Taipei University, where he researched white-collar crime and information warfare, and co-founded Kuma Academy, which provides civil defense and emergency preparedness training to Taiwanese civilians.

Shen entered electoral politics in 2023 and was elected to the Legislative Yuan through the DPP's party list in the 2024 Taiwanese legislative election. In October 2024, the Chinese government sanctioned Shen for his alleged support of Taiwanese independence.

== Early life and education ==
Shen was born on 7 June 1982 in Taipei, Taiwan. He came from an extended family in the Wufenpu area of Taipei, although he spent his earliest years living with his biological mother in Taichung. Because of recurring health problems during childhood, he returned to Taipei to live with his father when he was approximately four or five years old, and his parents divorced when he was six. His father, Shen Tu-cheng (沈土城), was a trader who operated in Central and South America, including Ecuador. Tu-cheng became the owner of a car manufacturing company, Sicuens International Co., LTD., which was sanctioned by the Chinese government in 2025.

After attending private schools, Shen graduated from Taipei Municipal Chien Kuo High School. As a student there, he became the president of a local culture research club (鄉土文化研究社). He then enrolled at National Taiwan University in 2000 to study law, graduating with his Bachelor of Laws degree as the valedictorian of his class in 2004. He subsequently began teaching criminal law at an examination preparation school under the pseudonym Puma (撲馬), providing instruction to students preparing for legal and civil service examinations.

In 2007, Shen earned a Master of Laws (LL.M.) degree from the University of Pennsylvania Law School. He earned a second LL.M. from National Taiwan University in 2008. In 2009, he received a government scholarship to pursue overseas studies in criminal law. Before resuming his studies abroad, he completed alternative military service as a foreign-language specialist. He then earned his Ph.D. from the University of California, Irvine in 2017 in criminology and sociology under sociologist Henry Pontell. His doctoral dissertation was titled, Local Ideologies and Punishment for White-Collar Crime: A Comparison Between the U.S. and China.

== Academic career ==
After receiving his doctorate, Shen became an assistant professor of criminology at National Taipei University (NTPU). His research interests included criminal law, the sociology of law, criminal justice, and white-collar crime. At NTPU, Shen taught courses in criminological theory, white-collar crime, criminal law, criminology, and contemporary criminological literature.

Shen received a teaching excellence award from NTPU in 2022. By September 2023, he was an associate professor at the university. On 1 August 2023, he became the director of the university's Graduate School of Criminology.

=== Research on information warfare ===
In 2018, Shen began studying the People's Republic of China's cognitive warfare activities and influence operations directed at Taiwan, subsequently expanding his research into disinformation and political interference. Between 2020 and 2023, he was the principal investigator for a three-year research project on event detection, tracking, and the identification of textual credibility, funded through Taiwan's national science and technology research agencies. Shen also became involved in international research on Chinese political influence through DoublethinkLab, a Taiwanese organization studying information operations and digital authoritarianism.

In October 2023, Shen became principal investigator of a Taiwan–United Kingdom bilateral research project titled "Information Threats to Democratic Societies: A Cross-Regional and Interdisciplinary Comparison Between Taiwan and the United Kingdom", scheduled to run until September 2024. In November 2023, Doublethink Lab announced that Shen had resigned as its unpaid chairperson to pursue elected office.

== Political career ==
=== Member of the Legislative Yuan ===
In November 2023, Shen was nominated by the Democratic Progressive Party (DPP) as a candidate on the party-list of legislators for nationwide and overseas, ranking second. He won the election on January 13, 2024. He has expressed the necessity of legislative responses to various aspects of China's influence on Taiwan, including international law, propaganda warfare, and the need to address threats from Chinese agents and gray zone activities through legislation and national defense reforms.

In May 2024, Shen, with help from DPP colleagues, climbed on top of a crowd of Kuomintang legislators during a brawl in the Legislative Yuan. He was dragged down by them and fell from the podium, requiring hospitalization.

On 14 May 2026, the DPP announced the nomination of Shen as the candidate for the mayor of Taipei for the election at the end of the year.

=== Transnational repression ===
On 15 October 2024, Shen was sanctioned by China's Taiwan Affairs Office, which included him on a list of "diehard 'Taiwan independence' separatists". In October 2025, China's Xinhua News Agency announced that the Chongqing public security bureau was investigating Shen for "secession-related" activities under the Criminal Law of the People's Republic of China. Taiwanese officials stated that the investigation was meant to "create the illusion of long-arm jurisdiction over Taiwan" and "sow divisions and instill fear." China Central Television (CCTV) cited Renmin University law professor Cheng Lei as suggesting that Shen could be arrested worldwide through mechanisms such as Interpol Red Notices, which Taiwan's Mainland Affairs Council described as "transnational repression."

== Personal life ==
Shen is married to Tseng Hsin-hui (Chinese: 曾心慧; pinyin: Zēng Xīnhuì), a lawyer who also teaches civil law at a cram school using the pseudonym Chihiro (千尋). The couple has no biological children but adopted a girl nicknamed "Mochi" (麻糬, Môa-chî).
