= Ma Xiaoguang =

Chinese politician, diplomat (born 1955)

- 马晓光
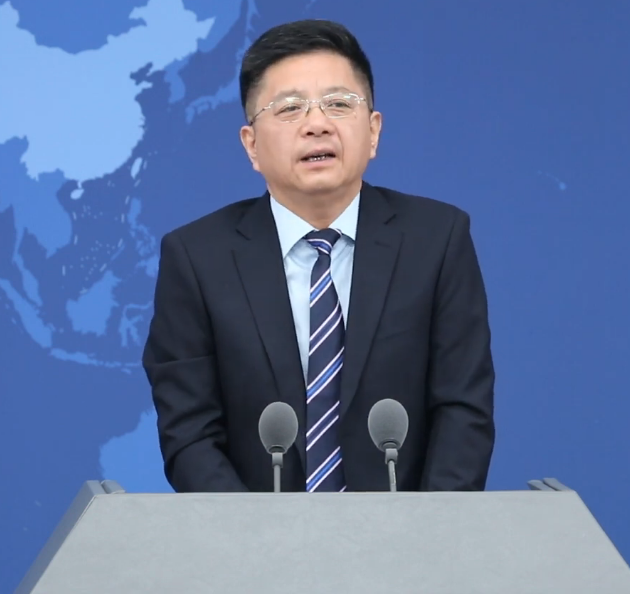
- Ma in April 2022

Director of the Information Bureau of the Taiwan Affairs Office of the State Council
- In office November 2013 – November 2023
- Deputy: Fan Liqing; An Fengshan; Zhu Fenglian
- Preceded by: Yang Yi

Personal details
- Born: 1955 (age 70–71) Kailu County, Inner Mongolia, China
- Party: Chinese Communist Party
- Education: Peking University

Chinese name
- Simplified Chinese: 马晓光
- Traditional Chinese: 馬曉光
Transcriptions
Standard Mandarin
- Hanyu Pinyin: Mă Xiǎoguāng

Ma Xiaoguang (Chinese: 马晓光; born 1955) is a Chinese diplomat who was director of the Information Bureau of the Taiwan Affairs Office of the State Council from January 2014 to November 2023.

== Biography ==
Ma was born in Kailu County, Inner Mongolia, in 1955. His father was an editor of a TV station, and his mother was a teacher of a primary school of Hui people. In 1970, his parents were sent to the May Seventh Cadre Schools to do farm works in Yongji County (now Yongji), Shanxi, where he was educated. In 1980, he was admitted to Peking University with the first place of students of arts in Shanxi province. After graduating in 1987, he joined the faculty of the Renmin University of China, where he taught the history of literary criticism in ancient China.

Ma was transferred to the Association for Relations Across the Taiwan Straits in 1992.

In November 2013, he was promoted to director of the Information Bureau of the Taiwan Affairs Office of the State Council, concurrently holding the spokesperson position.

Government offices
Preceded by Yang Yi (杨毅)	Director of the Information Bureau of the Taiwan Affairs Office of the State Council; 2013–2023	Succeeded by Chen Binhua
