= Lin Fei-fan =

Taiwanese politician and activist (born 1988)

- 林飛帆
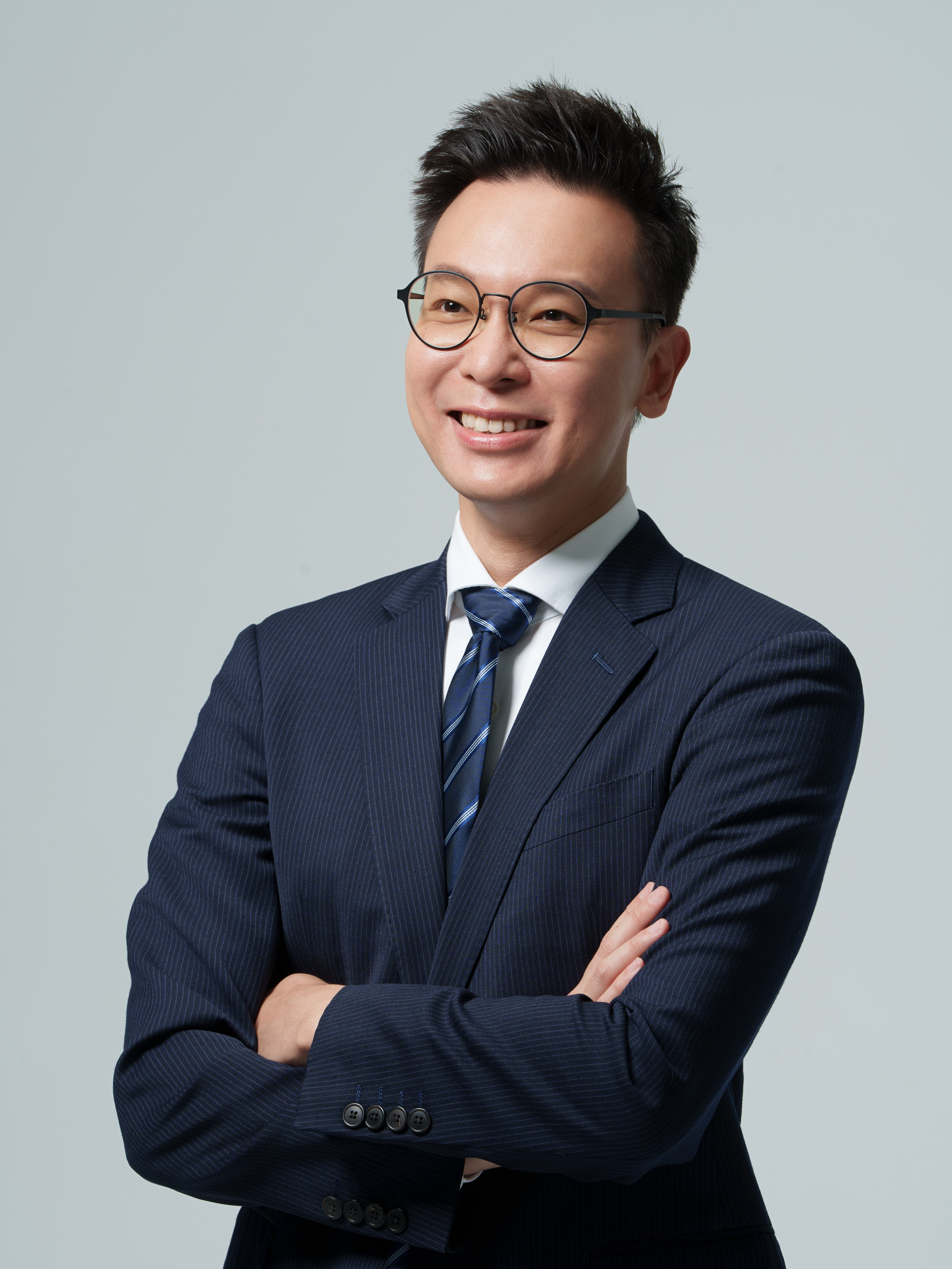
- Official portrait, 2024

Deputy Secretary-General of the National Security Council
- Incumbent
- Assumed office 20 May 2024 Serving with Hsu Szu-chien and Liu Te-chin
- Secretary-General: Joseph Wu
- Preceded by: York Chen

22nd Deputy Secretary-General of the Democratic Progressive Party
- In office 15 July 2019 – 18 January 2023
- Secretary-General: Luo Wen-jia; Lin Hsi-yao; Sydney Lin
- Preceded by: Hsu Chia-ching
- Succeeded by: Yang Yi-shan

Personal details
- Born: 19 May 1988 (age 38) East, Tainan, Taiwan
- Party: Democratic Progressive Party
- Education: National Cheng Kung University (BA); National Taiwan University (MA); London School of Economics (MSc)
- Known for: Leading the Sunflower Student Movement

Lin Fei-fan (Chinese: 林飛帆; pinyin: Lín Fēifán; Tâi-lô: Lîm Hui-huân; born 19 May 1988) is a Taiwanese politician and activist currently serving as deputy secretary-general of Taiwan's National Security Council. Lin was one of the leaders of the Sunflower Student Movement. He joined the Democratic Progressive Party as deputy secretary-general in 2019.

== Early life and education ==
Lin was born on 19 May 1988 in Tainan, Taiwan. He began studying public administration at National Chi Nan University before graduating from National Cheng Kung University with a B.A. in political science in 2011. He then earned an M.A. in political science from National Taiwan University in 2017 and completed graduate studies in England at the London School of Economics, where he earned an M.Sc. in comparative politics in 2018.

== Activism career ==
Court proceedings against 21 protesters began in June 2016. Lin was among the first to be charged with various offenses, along with Chen Wei-ting and Huang Kuo-chang. In a March 2017 Taipei District Court decision, Chen, Huang, and Lin were acquitted of incitement charges.

== Political career ==
Lin joined the Democratic Progressive Party in July 2019 as deputy secretary-general.

On August 17, 2022, in the aftermath of then-U.S. House Speaker Nancy Pelosi's visit to Taiwan, Beijing blacklisted seven Taiwanese officials, including Lin, whom it labelled as "diehard "Taiwan independence" separatists" for their support of Taiwan independence. They were banned from entering mainland China, Hong Kong, and Macau, and prohibited from maintaining financial or personal connections with mainland individuals and organizations.

The DPP endorsed Lin's legislative candidacy in May 2023, for Taipei 3 in the 2024 Taiwanese legislative election. Lin dropped out two weeks later, after media coverage of a 2022 sexual assault allegation against a director hired by the party. Handling of the allegation was said to have been mishandled by Lin's former subordinate Hsu Chia-tien, and Lin said he would assume responsibility as head of the department.

On May 15, 2024, Lin was appointed deputy secretary-general at Taiwan's National Security Council, effective May 20, 2024, under the leadership of Joseph Wu in the Lai Ching-te administration. He is the youngest individual to hold the position.

== Personal life ==
Lin married Lin Ya-Ping in June 2017.

== Publications ==
=== Articles ===
- Seeds of the Sunflower Movement, Jamestown Foundation, February 16, 2024
- Skepticism Toward U.S. Support for Taiwan Harms Regional Security, National Interest, March 15, 2023 (co-authored with Wen Lii)
- It's time the free world commits to the defense of Taiwan, New York Times, August 12, 2022
- Americans should stop using Taiwan to score political points against Trump and China, The Washington Post, December 6, 2016 (co-authored with Chen Wei-ting and June Lin)

Party political offices
Preceded by Hsu Chia-ching	Deputy Secretary-General of the Democratic Progressive Party; 2019–2023	Succeeded by Yang Yi-shan
