= Trial in absentia =

Criminal proceeding involving an absent defendant

Trial in absentia is a criminal proceeding in a court of law in which the person being tried is not present. In absentia is Latin for "in (the) absence". Its interpretation varies by jurisdiction and legal system.

In common law legal systems, the phrase is more than a spatial description. In these systems, it suggests a recognition of a violation of a defendant's right to be present in court proceedings in a criminal trial. Conviction in a trial in which a defendant is not present to answer the charges is held to be a violation of natural justice. Specifically, it violates the second principle of natural justice, audi alteram partem (hear the other party).

In some civil law legal systems, such as that of Italy, absentia is a recognized and accepted defense strategy. Such trials may require the presence of the defendant's lawyer, depending on the country.

== Europe ==
Signatories to the European Convention on Human Rights

Member states of the Council of Europe that are party to the European Convention on Human Rights are bound to adhere to Article 6 of the convention, which protects the right to a fair trial.

Trials in absentia are banned in some member states of the EU and permitted in others, posing significant problems for the fluidity of mutual recognition of these judicial judgments. The executing member state possesses some degree of discretion, and is not obliged to execute a European Arrest Warrant if the country that is making the request has already tried that person in absentia.

Conditions under which trials in absentia must be recognised include: if the person can be said to have been aware of the trial; if a counsellor took their place at the trial; if they do not request an appeal in due time; and if they are to be offered an appeal.

The framework decision on the European Arrest Warrant provides for the legal guarantees relevant to trials in absentia. While the framework decision explicitly refers to Article 6 of the European Convention on Human Rights, its purpose is not to harmonise national laws on trials in absentia but to provide terms for the non-recognition of a European Arrest Warrant and other cooperative tools. The framework decision provides detailed conditions and requirements on which a trial in absentia can be considered compatible with Article 6, the right to a fair trial.

According to Pieter Cleppe of the think-tank Open Europe, in parts of Europe, in absentia trials essentially give defendants the ability to appeal twice—asking for a retrial at which they would be present and then potentially appealing the second verdict.

There are some guarantees in the legal system that make sure that it's fair, that the rights of the defense are not being violated, while still making sure that justice is being done. In absentia judgments are common ... you can criticize that, but it's quite common.

— Pieter Cleppe, Open Europe

The Council of Europe has made commentary on judgments that are made in absentia. The Committee of Ministers, in Resolution (75) 11, of 21 May 1975, stated that an individual must first be effectively served with a summons prior to being tried. In this sense, the ministers are emphasizing that it is not the presence of the accused at the hearing that is of importance, rather the focus should be on whether or not the individual was informed of the trial in time.

In a 1985 judgement in the case Colozza v Italy, the European Court of Human Rights stressed that a person charged with a criminal offence is entitled to take part in the hearings. This entitlement is based on the right to a fair trial and the right to a defence, both of which are required by the convention (articles 6(1) and 6(3)). Furthermore, the court stressed that a person convicted in absentia shall be entitled to a fresh trial once he becomes aware of the proceedings:

When domestic law permits a trial to be held notwithstanding the absence of a person "charged with a criminal offence" who is in Mr. Colozza’s position, that person should, once he becomes aware of the proceedings, be able to obtain, from a court which has heard him, a fresh determination of the merits of the charge.

— European Court of Human Rights, Colozza vs. Italy

=== Belgium ===
The Human Rights Committee (HRC) examined Monguya Mbenge v. Zaire (1990) in which the applicant was sentenced to death in Zaire while exiled in Belgium and was only able to learn of the case against him through the media. Due to these circumstances, the committee found that a number of the applicant's procedural rights had been violated, especially in consideration of the fact that the Zairean authorities had hardly attempted to contact the applicant despite possible knowledge of the applicant's address. This highly impeded the applicant's capacity to prepare any form of defense. Failed evidence to support the case that a court had tried to inform the accused of proceedings against him/her provides the committee with the opinion that the right to be tried in one's presence was violated.

=== Czech Republic ===
Under Article 8(2) of the Charter of Fundamental Rights and Basic Freedoms of the Czech Republic, which has the same legal standing as the Czech Constitution, no one may be prosecuted or deprived of their liberty except on grounds and in a manner specified by law.

In general, the Czech Criminal Procedural Code requires the presence of the defendant in any criminal proceedings. The code recognizes the following exemptions from this rule, when criminal proceedings may be conducted without the presence of the person charged:

- Where a defendant has died (involving the continuation or reopening of proceedings in order to clear a deceased defendant's name).
- Where a defendant is unknown:
  - This may arise before charges against a person are brought, normally in respect of pre-trial proceedings. For example, if police conclude that a crime has been committed and that action needs to be taken to identify the perpetrator, such as the interrogation of a witness or an identity parade, such an action is taken in the presence of a judge because the rights of the (still unidentified) criminal suspect cannot otherwise be adequately protected during the evidence gathering. Normally, a defendant enjoys the right to be present or represented by an attorney during the interrogation or identity parade. But where the defendant is not yet identified, in order to secure full legality and impartiality, a judge is present. This ensures the admissibility of the resulting evidence will not be successfully challenged during the trial. Typically, this situation might involve a dying witness, not expected to be available later for cross-examination at a trial by or on behalf of the defendant.
  - When confiscating property involved in criminal case from an unknown owner, the property confiscated will remain the property of the unknown owner pending a trial and a court decision to transfer the property confiscated to the state. An example could arise where the property to be confiscated might endanger people, property or society, or might be used for commission of a felony. Typically, this concerns prohibited weapons or ammunition, explosives, narcotics, poisons, etc., seized by the police without, at the time of the seizure, knowing the owner's identity.
- Where a defendant is known:
  - Where an accused person is evading proceedings by being either abroad or in hiding, the proceedings may be conducted in absentia. The proceedings are then officially started by the formal delivery of charges to the defendant's attorney. If the defendant does not have an attorney, the court will appoint one. An attorney must in these circumstances be appointed throughout the entire proceedings, and will have all the defendant's rights. All documents intended for the defendant will be delivered to the attorney and the court must take "appropriate measures" to announce the trial publicly. Where the absent defendant subsequently appears during the trial, the proceedings shall continue in the normal way. The defendant may request that any evidence that had been presented in his absence be presented again; where this is not possible, he will be shown records of it and may comment on it. Where the case has ended with an enforceable judgment, the convicted party may request a fresh trial within eight days of the delivery of the judgment to him. The fresh trial may not lead to an outcome that would be less favorable to the defendant than the outcome of the previous in absentia trial.

Apart from the aforementioned cases of in absentia proceedings in the narrow sense, the defendant may also be absent during the trial under following circumstances:

- When the defendant fails to appear for the trial: only if
  - the indictment was duly delivered and
  - the defendant was duly summoned for the trial (i.e. is not in hiding) and
  - the defendant has already been formally questioned during pre-trial proceedings (whether or not they elected to remain silent) and
  - the defendant has been alerted about their right to study the case file and to put forward motions for investigation and
  - the court determines that, despite the defendant's absence from the trial, the case can be reliably decided and the purposes of the trial achieved.
- When the defendant requests that the trial takes place in their absence: if the defendant is being held on remand, a simple failure to appear is not permitted: the defendant must formally request that the proceedings to take place in their absence
- When the defendant is disrupting the proceedings: trial in absentia is possible only on basis of a formal ruling of, and subject to previous warning by, the court, and only for the necessary period of time. Immediately after allowing the defendant back into the courtroom, the presiding judge must convey the essential content of the proceedings taken in the defendant's absence, so as allow them to comment on it.

=== Italy ===
Italy is one of several countries in Europe that allow trials in absentia, and they are a regular occurrence.

In Maleki v Italy (1997), the United Nations Human Rights Committee held that the Italian policy on trials in absentia was a breach of the right to fair trial under Article 14 of the International Covenant on Civil and Political Rights. Italy argued that where a defendant in absentia is represented by court-appointed counsel and where they have an opportunity to be re-tried, the right to a fair trial will not be violated. The committee disagreed, describing Italy's position as:

clearly insufficient to lift the burden placed on the State party if it is to justify trying an accused in absentia. It was incumbent on the court that tried the case to verify that [Maleki] had been informed of the pending case before proceeding to hold the trial in absentia. Failing evidence that the court did so, the [HRC] is of the opinion that [Maleki's] right to be tried in his presence was violated.

In 2009, a former CIA station chief and two other Americans were tried and convicted in absentia by a Milan appeals court for the abduction of Egyptian terror suspect Hassan Mustafa Osama Nasr. In total 26 Americans were tried in absentia for the abduction, and all were found guilty. Nasr himself was tried and convicted in absentia of terror offences by an Italian court in 2013, after Egyptian authorities did not respond to requests for his extradition.

The re-trial of American Amanda Knox for the 2007 murder of British student Meredith Kercher highlighted the issue of Italy's willingness to try defendants in absentia. Knox had returned to the United States after winning an appeal against her original conviction, but in 2013 Italy's highest court, the Court of Cassation, annulled the acquittal of Knox and co-accused Italian Raffaele Sollecito, declaring the acquittal as "full of deficiencies, contradictions and illogical conclusions". A re-trial was held, but as Knox remained in the United States and could not be compelled to return to Italy, the trial was held in absentia, in Florence, Italy. On 30 January 2014 she was once again convicted of the murder of Kercher sentenced to 28 years and six months imprisonment, longer than her original sentence. Knox stated she would not return to Italy to serve her sentence

In the case of Goddi v. Italy, the European Court of Human Rights held that the failure of Italy's judiciary to inform the officially appointed lawyer of the applicant in regards to the correct date of the trial hearing deprived the applicant of an effective defence, and therefore Article 6 (3) (c) had been violated.

Certain case law supports the notion that in some circumstances representation by counsel at the trial will not be enough to make an in absentia conviction conclusive enough for the establishment of probable cause. In Gallina v Fraser, the appellant Vincenzo Gallina was convicted in absentia according to established Italian procedure for two robberies. The verdict in Gallina has been since interpreted to suggest that the presence of legal counsel alone is, in certain cases, insufficient to give an in absentia conviction that establishes probable cause.

== China ==
In 2024, the Chinese government issued legal guidelines stating that advocates of Taiwanese independence could be tried in absentia; if found guilty of causing "grave harm to the state and the [Chinese] people", they could be sentenced to death.

== United States ==
For more than 100 years, courts in the United States have held that the United States Constitution protects a criminal defendant's right to appear in person at their trial, as a matter of due process, under the Fifth, Sixth, and Fourteenth Amendments.

In 1884, the Supreme Court of the United States held that

the legislature has deemed it essential to the protection of one whose life or liberty is involved in a prosecution for felony, that he shall be personally present at the trial, that is, at every stage of the trial when his substantial rights may be affected by the proceedings against him. If he be deprived of his life or liberty without being so present, such deprivation would be without that due process of law required by the Constitution.

— Hopt v. Utah 110 US 574, 28 L Ed 262, 4 S Ct 202 (1884).

A similar holding was announced by the Arizona Court of Appeals in 2004 (based on Arizona Rules of Criminal Procedure):

A voluntary waiver of the right to be present requires true freedom of choice. A trial court may infer that a defendant's absence from trial is voluntary and constitutes a waiver if a defendant had personal knowledge of the time of the proceeding, the right to be present, and had received a warning that the proceeding would take place in their absence if they failed to appear. The courts indulge every reasonable presumption against the waiver of fundamental constitutional rights.

— State v. Whitley, 85 P.3d 116 (2004) (Depublished Opinion).

Although United States Congress codified this right by approving Rule 43 of the Federal Rules of Criminal Procedure in 1946 and amended the Rule in 1973, the right is not absolute.

Rule 43 provides that a defendant shall be present

- at the arraignment,
- at the time of the plea,
- at every stage of the trial including the impaneling of the jury and the return of the verdict and
- at the imposition of sentence.

However, the following exceptions are included in the Rule:

- the defendant waives their right to be present if they voluntarily leave the trial after it has commenced,
- if they persist in disruptive conduct after being warned that such conduct will cause them to be removed from the courtroom,
- a corporation need not be present, but may be represented by counsel,
- in prosecutions for misdemeanors, the court may permit arraignment, plea, trial, and imposition of sentence in the defendant's absence with their written consent, and
- the defendant need not be present at a conference or argument upon a question of law or at a reduction of sentence under Rule 35 of the Federal Rules of Criminal Procedure.

Indeed, several U.S. Supreme Court decisions have recognized that a defendant may forfeit the right to be present at trial through disruptive behavior, or through their voluntary absence after trial has begun.

In 1993, the Supreme Court revisited Rule 43 in the case of Crosby v. United States. The Court unanimously held, in an opinion written by Justice Harry Blackmun, that Rule 43 does not permit the trial in absentia of a defendant who is absent at the beginning of trial.

This case requires us to decide whether Federal Rule of Criminal Procedure 43 permits the trial in absentia of a defendant who absconds prior to trial and is absent at its beginning. We hold that it does not. ...The Rule declares explicitly: "The defendant shall be present...at every stage of the trial...except as otherwise provided by this rule" (emphasis added). The list of situations in which the trial may proceed without the defendant is marked as exclusive not by the "expression of one" circumstance, but rather by the express use of a limiting phrase. In that respect the language and structure of the Rule could not be more clear.

However, in Crosby, the Rehnquist Court reiterated an 80-year-old precedent that

Where the offense is not capital and the accused is not in custody, ...if, after the trial has begun in his presence, he voluntarily absents himself, this does not nullify what has been done or prevent the completion of the trial, but, on the contrary, operates as a waiver of his right to be present and leaves the court free to proceed with the trial in like manner and with like effect as if he were present." Diaz v. United States, 223 U.S. at 455 [1912] (emphasis added).

== Examples ==
Examples of people convicted in absentia are:

- Charles I of England was removed from his trial due to his disruptive behavior, and sentenced to death by beheading without being in the room.
- Cesare Battisti, thriller author and former member of the Italian terrorist group Armed Proletarians for Communism, sentenced to life. (Arrested on March 18, 2007, in Brazil, and then released on 9 June 2011.)
- Ian Bailey, a British man convicted in absentia by a French court of the murder of a French woman in Ireland.
- Homère Filippi and Charles Altiéri, French drug dealers of the Marseille Milieu who were sentenced to life in absentia in 1991 for having murdered the prosecutor Pierre Michel. From his 1982 hiding, the Filippi's whereabouts is unknown until nowadays while Altiéri served his sentence after 1993 arrest until he was paroled in 2014.
- Adem Jashari, leader of the Kosovo Liberation Army, was convicted in July 1997 in absentia by a Yugoslav court after several unsuccessful attempts to capture or kill him.
- Krim Belkacem, Algerian Berber resistance fighter and politician. (Assassinated on October 18, 1970, in West Germany.)
- Heinrich Boere, a Dutch or German convicted by a Dutch court in 1949 of murders on the part of the World War II German occupation authorities in the Netherlands. German courts refused to extradite Boere to the Netherlands due to his possibly having German citizenship.
- Martin Bormann, Nazi official and Hitler's private secretary, convicted of war crimes and crimes against humanity and sentenced to death by hanging at the Nuremberg war crimes trials. (Disappeared on May 2, 1945, his remains were uncovered in late 1972 in West Berlin, and conclusively identified as those of Bormann in 1998.)
- Dési Bouterse, Suriname's former military leader, sentenced to 16 years in prison and fined $2.18 million in the Netherlands for cocaine trafficking.
- Ahmed Chalabi, former Iraqi oil minister, convicted in Jordan for bank fraud.
- Bettino Craxi, Italian former prime minister, sentenced in absentia to 27 years in jail in Italy, who previously fled to Hammamet in Tunisia in 1994, and remained a fugitive there, protected by Ben Ali's regime.
- Léon Degrelle, Belgian Nazi collaborator sentenced to death by firing squad while he lived in Spain.
- Ryszard Kukliński, a Polish colonel, Cold War spy and communist whistleblower, sentenced in absentia to death as a traitor in 1984 by a communist court in the Polish People's Republic. He was finally acquitted in 1997. It was said his activity was in a State of Necessity.
- Ira Einhorn, murderer and anti-war activist, who challenged his conviction in Pennsylvania. (Escaped to Europe, but was extradited from France back to the US on July 20, 2001.)
- John Factor, a British-born American gangster and con man, charged with securities fraud in England and tried and sentenced to 24 years in prison in absentia after fleeing back to the United States.
- Charles de Gaulle, sentenced first to four years in prison and later to death in 1940 for treason against the Vichy regime.
- Oleg Gordievsky, sentenced to death by the Soviet Union for treason after fleeing to the United Kingdom in 1985.
- Boļeslavs Maikovskis, Latvian Nazi collaborator sentenced to death by a Soviet court in 1965 (while living in the United States).
- Mengistu Haile Mariam, former communist dictator sentenced to death in Ethiopia for genocide in May 2008.
- Jamal Jafaar Mohammed aka Abu Mahdi al-Muhandis, sentenced to death by a Kuwaiti court for the 1983 Kuwait bombings. He served in Iraq's parliament (2006–2007) as a member of Prime Minister Nouri al-Maliki's Islamic Dawa Party and was killed in the 2020 Baghdad International Airport airstrike by a United States drone.
- Abu Musab al-Zarqawi, sentenced to death in Jordan. (Killed on June 7, 2006, in Iraq.)
- Andrew Luster, convicted of rape after fleeing mid-trial.
- Filiberto Ojeda Ríos, convicted in the US after fleeing.
- Zine El Abidine Ben Ali, former president of Tunisia, sentenced to life in prison along with his wife, Leïla Ben Ali.
- Heinrich Oberleiter, Italian terrorist in Trentino-Alto Adige region who was sentenced to life in absentia because was runaway since 1963 until 2021 when he was pardoned.
- Salvatore Riina, Boss of bosses of the Sicilian Mafia who was given 2 life sentences in absentia at the Maxi-Trial given that Riina was fugitive from 1969. Riina was finally arrested in 1993 at Palermo.
- Bernardo Provenzano, Sicilian Mafia boss who received multiple life sentences in absentia for 150 murders given that he was 42 years fugitive.
- Filippo Marchese, Giuseppe Greco and Rosario Riccobono, Sicilian Mafia bosses who were sentenced to life in absentia at the Maxi-Trial given that it didn't know about their deaths until some mobsters turned into state witnesses told all three were murdered and their bodies were dissolved in acid.
- Michael Townley, Chilean DINA agent, has been convicted in 1993 by an Italian court in carrying out the 1975 Rome murder attempt on Bernardo Leighton. (Currently living under the United States Federal Witness Protection Program.)
- Sholam Weiss, sentenced to the longest federal prison term in United States history (835 years) for fraud, money laundering and other crimes, jumped bail mid-trial. (Extradited by Austria on June 20, 2002.)
- Arkady Shevchenko, high ranking SVR official of the USSR, sentenced to death in Moscow in absentia after defecting to the United States.
- Irakli Okruashvili, Defense Minister of Georgia from 2004 to 2006 and a personal friend of Georgian president Mikheil Saakashvili. Okruashvili returned to prominence when he formed an opposition party to the Georgian government and accused it of corruption and plotting assassinations. He was arrested days later on charges of extortion, bribe taking, and abuse of power, and released on $6 million bail pending trial. He flew to Europe, supposedly to seek medical treatment, but tried to find political asylum. He was denied asylum in Germany, but received it in France, which refused an extradition request from Georgia. He was tried in absentia, found guilty, and sentenced to 11 years imprisonment.
- In 2011, Eugène Koffi Adoboli was sentenced to five years in jail in absentia stemming from an embezzlement scandal while he was Prime Minister of Togo.
- Anwar al-Awlaki, radical Islamic cleric assassinated by drone by the United States in Yemen in 2011, was tried in absentia by the Yemeni government.
- Alexander Poteyev, ex-colonel of the Russian intelligence agency SVR, was sentenced in absentia to 25 years of imprisonment on the charge of high treason by Moscow court in 2011. His whereabouts are unknown; presumably he lives in the United States under protection of the US government.
- Kent Kristensen, Danish businessman was sentenced in Romania in absentia to seven years for not paying an official in a building project. He was arrested in Spain in 2011 when he tried to save his child who was abducted by her mother. He is serving his time at the Giurgiu maximum security prison. In March 2012 it was reported that the Romania denied him his medication.
- Amanda Knox, tried in absentia and convicted in 2013 (later cleared), for the 2007 murder of Meredith Kercher.
- Dmitry Yazov, Soviet Marshal convicted in absentia by Lithuania for deadly military crackdown in 1991 and sentenced to 10 years in jail.
- Julie d'Aubigny, 17th-century French duelist charged with kidnapping, arson and body snatching in absentia.
- Muhammad Zaidan (aka. Abu Abbas), leader of the Palestinian Liberation Front, was charged in Italy in absentia to five terms of life imprisonment for his role as mastermind in the 1985 hijacking of the Italian cruise ship MS Achille Lauro, which resulted in the murder of 69-year-old American Jewish passenger Leon Klinghoffer. He was captured by American forces on April 14, 2003, during the Iraq War and died on March 8, 2004, of natural causes, while in American custody.
- Mauricio Funes, a former president of El Salvador (2009–2014), was convicted and sentenced in absentia to 14 years imprisonment in May 2023 for his role in organizing a gang truce between 2012 and 2014. At the time of his sentencing, Funes was living in exile in Nicaragua.
- Khalid Latif, a former Pakistani cricketer, was convicted in absentia to 12 years imprisonment by a Dutch court in September 2023 for attempting to provoke the murder of Dutch politician Geert Wilders, for incitement, and for making threats.
- Marina Ovsyannikova, a Russian journalist, was sentenced in absentia to 8.5 years in prison in October 2023 for spreading "false information" about the Russian armed forces in Ukraine. Ovsyannikova called the sentence "politically motivated" and "absurd".
- Adil Raja, a retired Pakistan Army major and journalist, was sentenced in absentia to 14 years’ rigorous imprisonment in a military court-martial in 2023.
- Yasser Abu Shabab, leader of the Popular Forces, was charged by a Gazan court in absentia for treason, insurrection, collaboration with Israeli forces in the Gaza Strip and organized crime, notably perpetrating the Kerem Shalom aid convoy looting (killed on December 4, 2025, in Gaza).
- Hemedti, leader of the Rapid Support Forces of Sudan, was sentenced to death in absentia by a court in Port Sudan on 12 July 2026. He was convicted for murders and massacres in Darfur.

== See also ==
- Audi alteram partem
- Contumacy
- Declared death in absentia
- Default judgment (a civil counterpart)
- In absentia (disambiguation)
- List of Latin phrases
