= Li Mei-jhen =

Taiwanese politician (born 1979)

- 李眉蓁
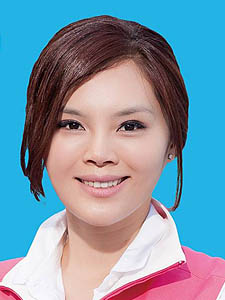

Kaohsiung City Councilor
- Incumbent
- Assumed office 25 December 2010
- Constituency: 4th Constituency of Kaohsiung

Personal details
- Born: 21 March 1979 (age 47) Kaohsiung, Taiwan
- Party: Kuomintang
- Education: Cheng Shiu University (BS, MA); National Sun Yat-sen University (MA)

Li Mei-jhen (Chinese: 李眉蓁; pinyin: Lǐ Méizhēn; born 21 March 1979), also known as Jane Lee, is a Taiwanese politician.

== Early life and education ==
Li was born on 21 March 1979. She graduated from Cheng Shiu University with a bachelor's degree and a master's degree, then completed a second master's degree in Chinese studies from National Sun Yat-sen University (NSYSU). Li Mei-jhen then worked for her father while he served on the Kaohsiung City Council. Li sought the Kuomintang nomination for a seat on the Kaohsiung City Council in 2010, and succeeded her father in office. She represented Nanzih and Zuoying Districts.

== 2020 Kaohsiung mayoral by-election ==
In June 2020, the Kuomintang selected Li as its candidate for the 2020 Kaohsiung mayoral by-election. A number of party members considered the nomination process that led to Li's selection chaotic, and raised the potential for vote splitting following Wu Yi-jheng's entry into the race. On 22 July 2020, NSYSU stated that it had begun investigating allegations that Li had plagiarized her master's degree thesis. On 23 July, Li apologized for the controversy and announced that she was "renouncing" her master's degree. NSYSU responded that the Degree Conferral Act (學位授予法) had no guidelines for allowing alumni to renounce their degrees and it would continue the investigation. The Kuomintang stated on 25 July that it would continue to support Li's candidacy.

On 15 August 2020, Li conceded the by-election to Democratic Progressive Party candidate Chen Chi-mai, congratulated him on his victory, and expressed further commitment to her post as councilor.

On 19 August 2020, NSYSU confirmed that Li Mei-jhen's degree thesis involved plagiarism, and an academic ethics committee unanimously voted to revoke her degree. Li's degree was formally revoked on 13 October 2020.

On 20 August 2024. Li gained her masters degree in cosmetics and makeup from Cheng Shiu University, where she also gained her bachelor's degree in chemical engineering.
