= Robert Tsao =

Taiwanese businessman

Tsao Hsing-cheng
- 曹興誠
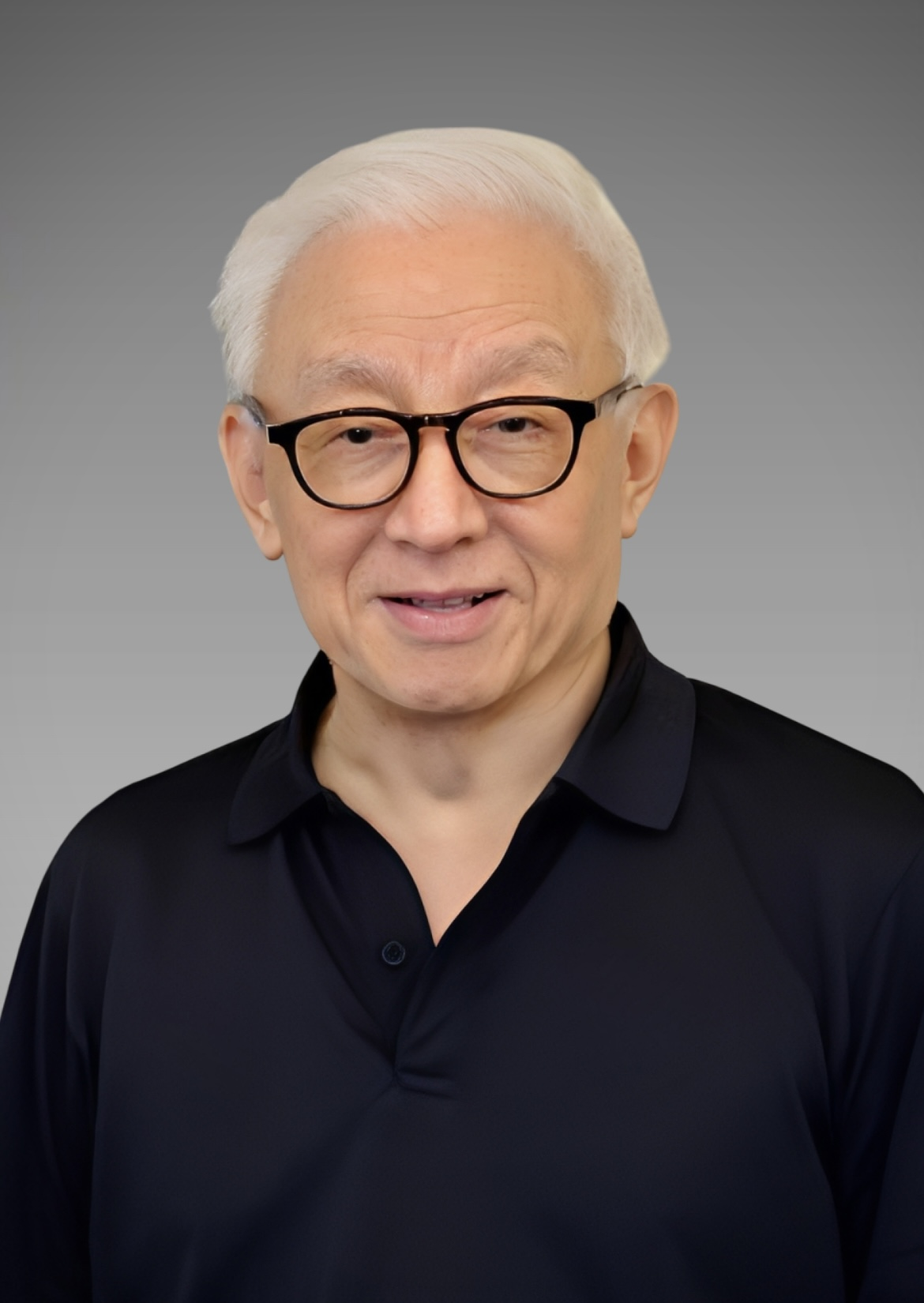
- Official portrait, 2024

Advisor of the Whole-of-Society Defense Resilience Committee
- In office 26 September 2024 – 26 June 2025
- President: Lai Ching-te

Personal details
- Born: 24 February 1947 (age 79) Peiping, Republic of China (present-day Beijing)
- Citizenship: Taiwan (1949–2011, 2022–present); Singapore (2011–2022)
- Education: National Taiwan University (BS); National Chiao Tung University (MS)
- Occupation: Businessman; art collector; activist

Chinese name
- Traditional Chinese: 曹興誠
- Simplified Chinese: 曹兴诚
Transcriptions
Standard Mandarin
- Hanyu Pinyin: Cáo Xīngchéng
- Wade–Giles: Tsao Hsing-cheng

Tsao Hsing-cheng (Chinese: 曹興誠; pinyin: Cáo Xīngchéng; born 24 February 1947), also known by his English name Robert, is a Taiwanese billionaire businessman best known as the founder of United Microelectronics Corporation (UMC). His net worth was estimated at US$2.7 billion in 2022.

== Early life and education ==
Tsao was born in 1947 in Beijing, China. He was one of six siblings. A year and a half later, he moved with his family to Taiwan during the Great Retreat since his father had taken a job in Taiwan teaching Mandarin as part of a Kuomintang (KMT) campaign of sinicization in the former Japanese colony.

After graduating from Taipei Municipal Chien Kuo High School, Tsai graduated from National Taiwan University with a bachelor's degree in electrical engineering and business management in 1969. He then earned a master's degree in management science from National Chiao Tung University in 1972.

== Career ==
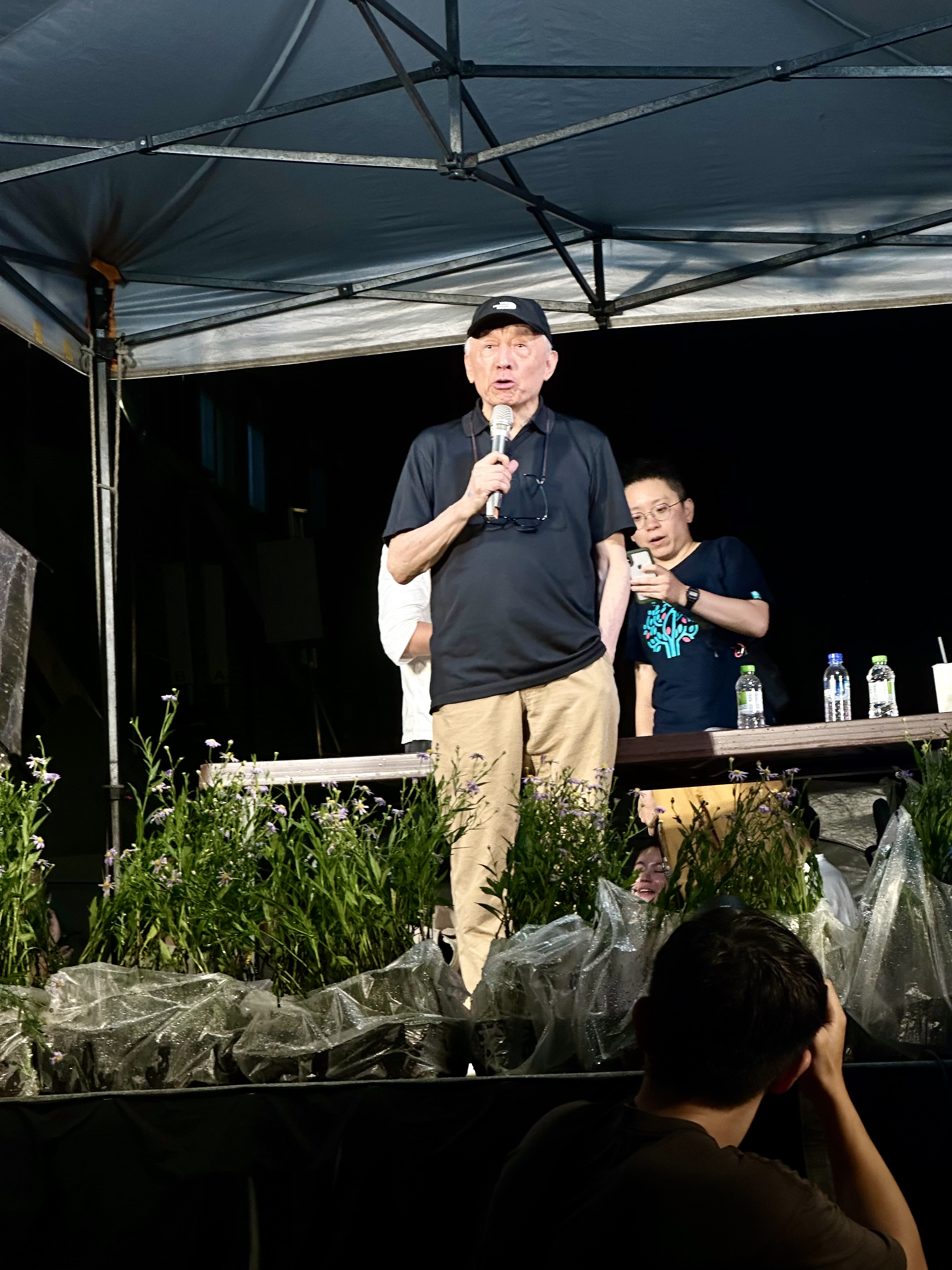
Robert Tsao at May 21 "Democracy regression, citizens to rescue" rally

After finishing school, Tsao went to work at the Industrial Technology Research Institute (ITRI). He left ITRI to found UMC in 1980.

In 1988 he visited Beijing and met with Jiang Zemin.

In 2001, UMC moved into China by setting up Hejian Technology (Suzhou) Co. in Jiangsu. This led to Tsao being charged in 2005 with violating Taiwan's Business Entity Accounting Act. He was found not guilty in 2010 by the Taiwan High Court.

Tsao became disillusioned with China following the 2019 Yuen Long attack. Tsao recounted "At that time, I had dinner with a top Chinese official. He told me the way to proceed was to hire hooligans to work with police officers to beat up protesters, then Hong Kongers would not defy the Chinese government." The ensuing Yuen Long attack "showed the true face of the Chinese Communist Party, a hooligan regime conducting violence against ordinary people... If it cannot get its way, its solution is to hire hooligans to beat people up." He had been living in Hong Kong at the time and following the attacks he vowed to leave stating "People in Hong Kong used peaceful means at street events to express their views, but the Chinese government used cruel means of suppression, including beatings. It really made me angry. So I decided to never go to China, Hong Kong or Macau again."

== Art collection ==
Tsao is a noted art collector. He began collecting art in the 1990s with jadeite before expanding to archaic bronzes. After buying his first jade pieces Tsao did extensive research, discovering that all of the pieces he had bought were fakes.

In 2000, Tsao acquired a Qianlong period glass vase for a record HK$24 million from Joseph Lau. In 2019 he sold the vase for HK$180 million.

Tsao was a patron of Zhu Dequn.

His collection is known as the Le Cong Tang collection.

== Philanthropy ==
Following the 2022 US Congressional Delegation visit to Taiwan and aggressive Chinese military reaction toward Taiwan, Tsao pledged US$100 million to Taiwan's national defense in the interest of "safeguarding freedom, democracy, and human rights." It formerly aimed to train a civilian self-defense militia and sharpshooters, but due to strict Taiwanese gun laws, the later part could not proceed. Instead, it focused on funding the civil defense group Kuma Academy which provides training for first aid, disaster response, open-source intelligence analysis, and self-defense. In October 2024, the government of China's Taiwan Affairs Office said that it would sanction and "punish" Tsao and Puma Shen as "diehard "Taiwan independence" separatists" for their support of the academy.

== Personal life ==
Tsao has two sons who hold Taiwanese citizenship.

In 2011, he moved to Singapore and renounced his Taiwanese citizenship. In 2022, Tsao renounced his Singaporean citizenship and reinstated his Taiwanese citizenship.

Tsao is a Buddhist and his faith was inspired by Master Sheng-yen.

== See also ==
- Zero Day (Taiwanese TV series)
