= Zhu Fenglian =

Chinese diplomat

- 朱凤莲
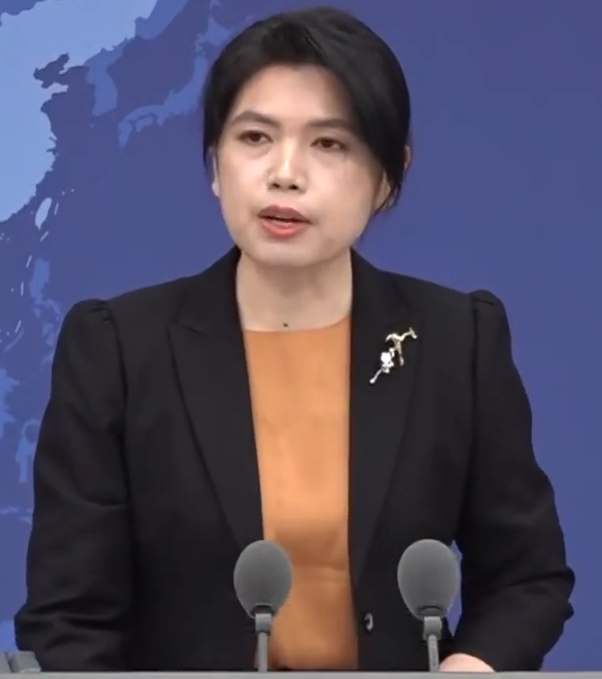
- Zhu in February 2024

Deputy Director of the Information Bureau of the Taiwan Affairs Office
- Incumbent
- Assumed office August 2019
- Director: Ma Xiaoguang
- Preceded by: An Fengshan

Personal details
- Born: November 1977 (age 48) Meizhou, Guangdong, China
- Party: Chinese Communist Party
- Education: Beihang University; Tsinghua University

Zhu Fenglian
- Traditional Chinese: 朱鳳蓮
- Simplified Chinese: 朱凤莲
Transcriptions
Standard Mandarin
- Hanyu Pinyin: Zhū Fènglián
- Bopomofo: ㄓㄨˉ ㄈㄥˋ ㄌㄧㄢˊ
- Wade–Giles: Chu Feng-lien
Hakka
- Romanization: Zhu1 Fung5 Lien2
Yue: Cantonese
- Jyutping: Zyu1 Fung6 Lin4
other Yue
- Taishanese: Zi Fung3 Lin4

Zhu Fenglian (simplified Chinese: 朱凤莲; traditional Chinese: 朱鳳蓮; pinyin: Zhū Fènglián; born November 1977) is a Chinese diplomat who is currently serving as deputy director and spokesperson of the information bureau at the Taiwan Affairs Office of the State Council.

== Early life ==
Zhu was born in Meizhou, Guangdong province in 1977, to a poor family of Hakka ethnicity. Her father was a construction worker and her mother was a small street vendor. In middle school, Zhu served as a hall monitor.

She graduated with Bachelor in Foreign Languages at Beihang University in 1996 and later graduated with Masters in Foreign Languages from the same institution in 2000. Zhu graduated with Masters in Public Administration at Tsinghua University.

== Diplomatic career ==
In July 2003, she joined the Taiwan Affairs Office (TAO) of the State Council of the People's Republic of China. From September 2010 to January 2019, she served as deputy director and director of the Hong Kong, Macao and Taiwan Affairs Bureau of TAO. In August 2019, she was appointed as the deputy director of the information bureau of TAO and later in November 2019, also made the spokesperson.

Besides her native language Mandarin, Zhu is also fluent in Cantonese, Hakka and Hokkien dialects.

== Statements ==
On July 31, 2020, following the death of former President of Taiwan Lee Teng-hui, who was an outspoken supporter of Taiwan independence, Zhu was quoted saying:

I want to stress that Taiwan independence is a dead end. The historical trend of national unification and national restoration cannot be stopped by any person or force.

On March 29, 2021, when Western clothing brands announced their boycott of cotton from Xinjiang in response to human rights abuses in that region, Zhu stated:

External anti-China forces concocted rumours such as 'forced labor' and 'genocide' in order to smear the image of the mainland, undermine the security and stability of Xinjiang, and curb the development of the mainland. They use cotton to talk about things, and the drunkard's intention is not to drink alcohol, but to slander and smear without bottom line.

On November 6, 2021, Zhu declared that China would hold supporters of Taiwan independence movement criminally liable. A blacklist was created which would penalise them by not letting them enter China and Special Administrative Regions of Hong Kong and Macau, and prohibiting them and their entities to do business in China. Zhu also stated regarding Taiwanese independence supporters:

Those who forget their ancestors, betray the motherland and split the country, will never end up well, and will be spurned by the people and judged by history.

On March 31, 2022, Zhu called on the Taiwanese youth to start business in China, saying:

The opportunities China can offer are beyond your imagination.
