= Henry Pontell =

American sociologist

Henry N. Pontell is an American sociologist, currently a Distinguished Professor and past Chair at John Jay College of Criminal Justice, City University of New York, and also a published author.

Among his honors is an honorary professorship, the Cecil and Ida Green Honors Chair at Texas Christian University. He has served as the Vice President of the American Society of Criminology, of which he is also a fellow. He is the President of the White-Collar Crime Research Consortium at the National White Collar Crime Center.
