= Kuma Academy =

Taiwanese civil defense organization

- Founders: Puma Shen; Ho Cheng-Hui
- Location: Taiwan
- Services: Civil defense training
- Website: kuma-academy.org

Kuma Academy (simplified Chinese: 黑熊学院; traditional Chinese: 黑熊學院; pinyin: Hēixióng Xuéyuàn), also known as the Black Bear Academy, is a Taiwanese non-profit civil defense organization which provides training to civilians on a variety of topics. The goal of the academy is to equip civilians in Taiwan with the basic knowledge and skills of civil defense, so that they can protect themselves in times of war and avoid interfering with the basic operations of Taiwan society, the regular military, and the government as a whole.

== Overview ==
Kuma Academy provides civil defense training to civilians in Taiwan. Classes cover topics like first aid and media literacy to combat disinformation from China.

Kuma Academy has also provided training in open-source intelligence and cybersecurity. According to Kuma their goal is "to decentralise civil defence."

== History ==
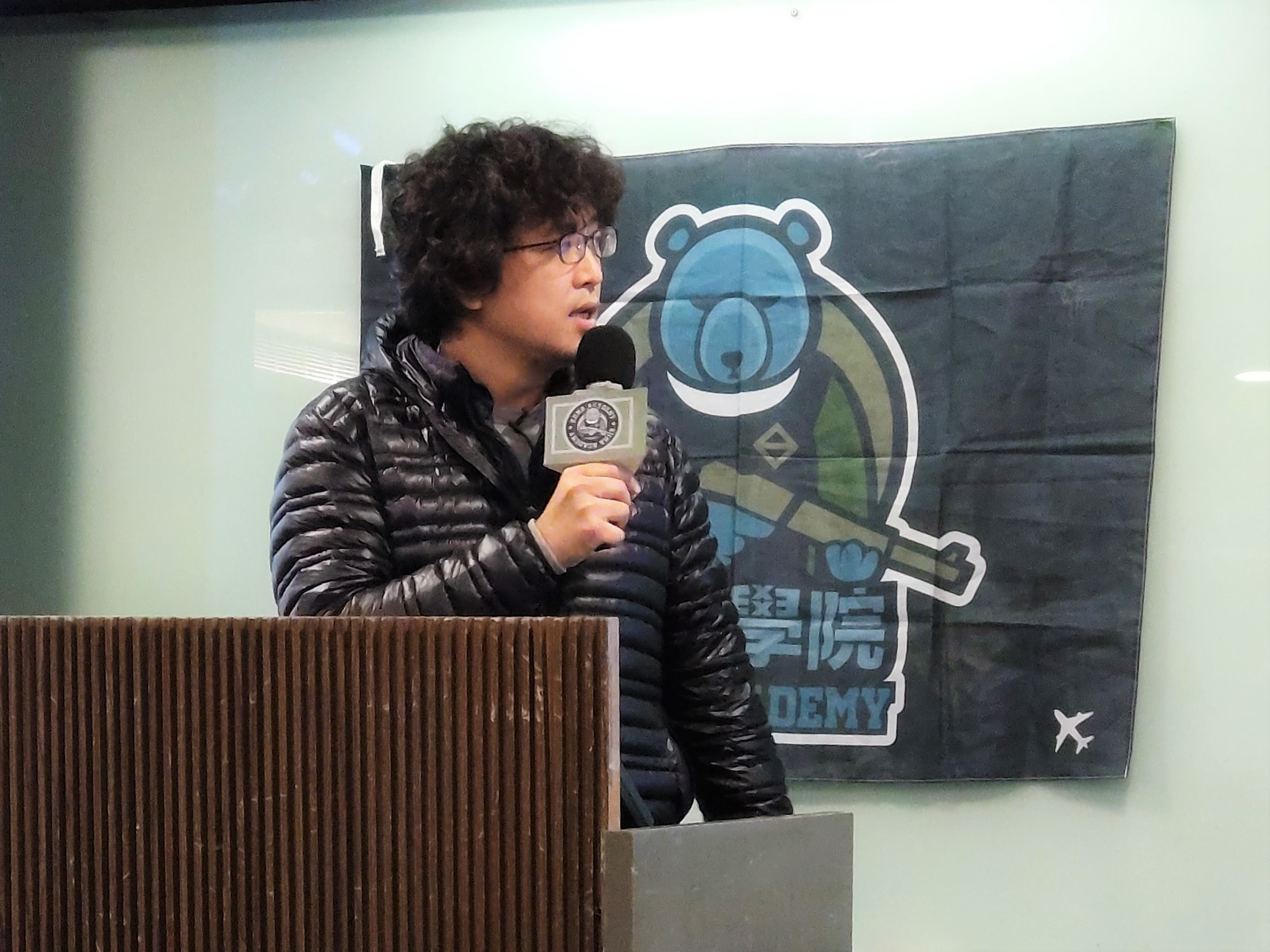
Puma Shen at a lecture held by Kuma Academy

Kuma Academy was founded by Puma Shen and Ho Cheng-Hui.

Interest in the organization, and civil defense overall, dramatically increased following the Russian invasion of Ukraine. In September 2022, the Kuma Academy had a waitlist of more than 3,000 for its classes.

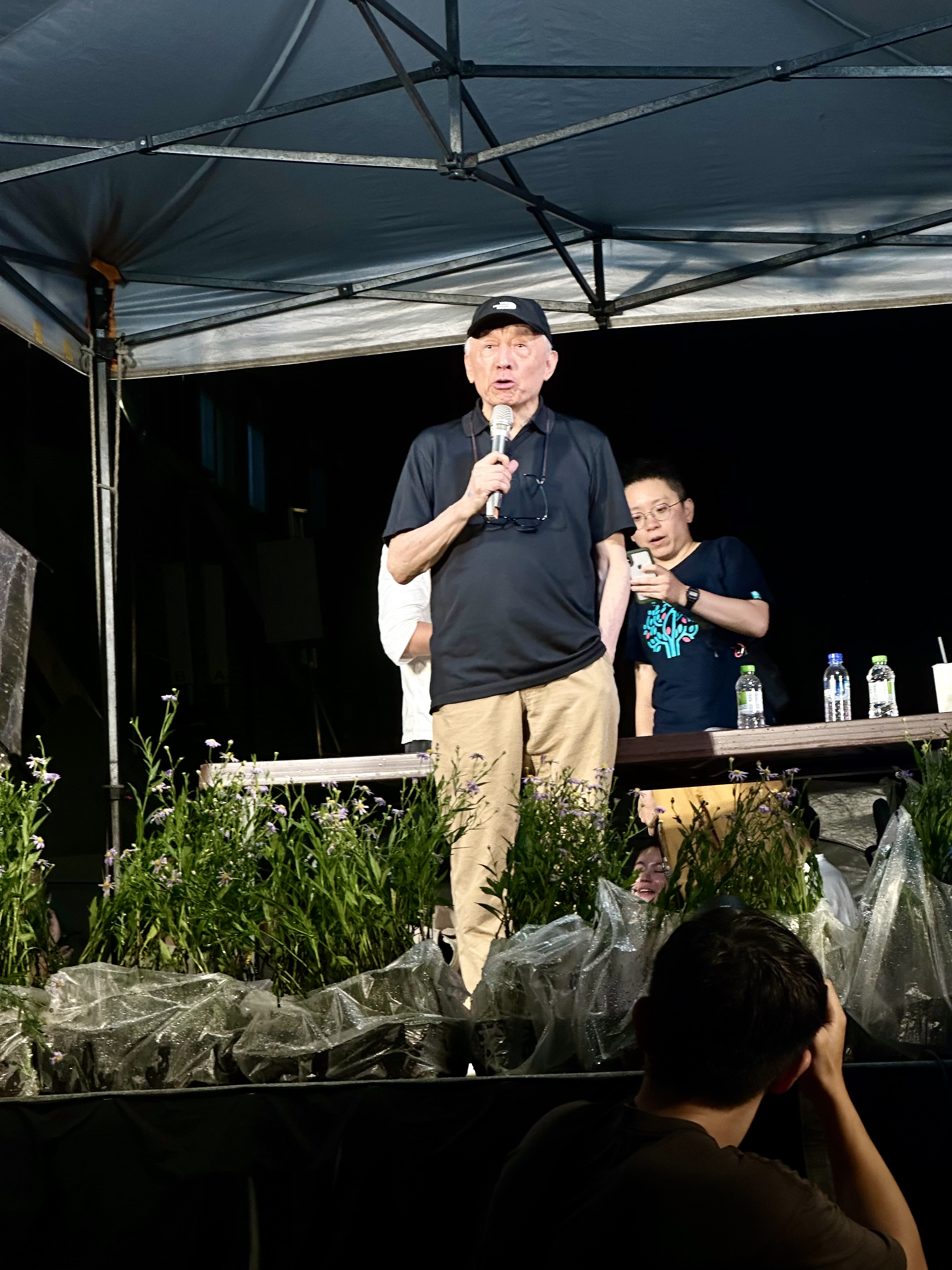
Robert Tsao

In 2022, retired businessman Robert Tsao pledged NTD $600m to Kuma Academy. In October 2024, the government of China's Taiwan Affairs Office said that it would sanction and "punish" Tsao and Puma Shen for their support of the academy.

In December 2024, the academy organized a nine-day “Stand Up for Taiwan” relay march promoting civil defense which began in Kaohsiung and ended at Huashan 1914 Creative Park in Taipei.

== See also ==
- Forward Alliance
- Irregular warfare
- Militia
