= Chen Binhua =

Chinese journalist and politician

- 陈斌华
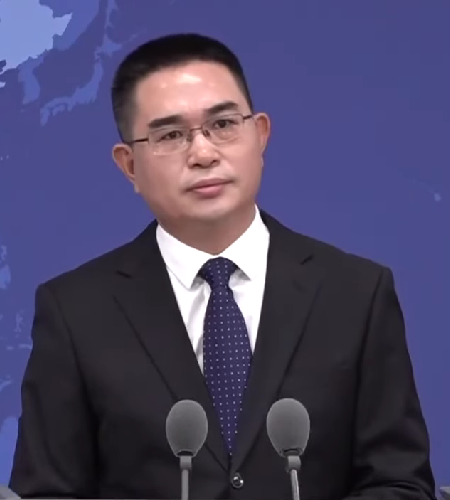
- Chen Binhua on 13 September 2023

Director of the Information Bureau of the Taiwan Affairs Office of the State Council
- Incumbent
- Assumed office 10 November 2023
- Preceded by: Ma Xiaoguang

Personal details
- Born: 18 September 1971 (age 55) Zhao'an County, Fujian, China
- Party: Chinese Communist Party
- Education: Xiamen University; Peking University

Chinese name
- Simplified Chinese: 陈斌华
- Traditional Chinese: 陳斌華
Transcriptions
Standard Mandarin
- Hanyu Pinyin: Chén Bīnhuá
Hakka
- Romanization: Chin1 Pin1 Fa2
Yue: Cantonese
- Jyutping: Can4 Ban1 Waa4
other Yue
- Taishanese: Can4 Ping1 Waa4
Southern Min
- Hokkien POJ: Tan5 Pin1 Hua7
- Teochew Peng'im: Tan5 Bin1 Hoa5
- Hainanese Romanization: Dang5 Bing1 Hua5
- Leizhou Romanization: Tan5 Peng1 Hua5

Chen Binhua (simplified Chinese: 陈斌华; traditional Chinese: 陳斌華 born 18 September 1971) is a Chinese journalist and politician currently serving as director and spokesperson of the Information Bureau of the Taiwan Affairs Office of the State Council.

== Early life and education ==
Chen was born in Zhao'an County, Fujian, on 18 September 1971. In 1989, he enrolled at Xiamen University, where he majored in Chinese language and literature. From 2002 to 2005, he did his postgraduate work at the School of Journalism and Communication, Peking University.

== Career ==
After graduating in 1993, Chen became a journalist for Xinhua News Agency, mainly engaged in news coverage of cross-strait relations. He was one of the first journalists stationed in Taiwan from the mainland China and visited Taiwan for dozens of times between 2001 and 2015.

Chen got involved in politics in April 2016, and finally became deputy director of the Economic Bureau of the Taiwan Affairs Office of the State Council. On 1 June 2023, he was chosen as deputy director of Information Bureau of the Taiwan Affairs Office, rising to director on 10 November.

Government offices
Preceded by Ma Xiaoguang	Director of the Information Bureau of the Taiwan Affairs Office of the State Council; 2023–present	Incumbent
