= Criminal Law of the People's Republic of China =

Law of China

Standing Committee of the National People's Congress
- Passed by: Standing Committee of the National People's Congress
- Passed: 6 June 1979
- Signed by: Chairman Ye Jianying
- Commenced: 1 January 1980

Amended by
- 1997, 1998, 1999, 2001 (2), 2002, 2005, 2006, 2009 (2), 2011, 2015, 2017, 2020, 2023
- Status: Amended

Criminal Law of the People's Republic of China
- Simplified Chinese: 中华人民共和国刑法
- Traditional Chinese: 中華人民共和國刑法
Transcriptions
Standard Mandarin
- Hanyu Pinyin: Zhōnghuá Rénmín Gònghéguó Xíngfǎ

The Criminal Law of the People's Republic of China is the criminal code of the country. Among them, the Criminal Law is a basic law of the People's Republic of China. On the basis of the Criminal Law, there are other separate laws that stipulate new crimes and penalties. As of 2023, the Criminal Law consists of a Criminal Code, twelve amendments, and one or two separate laws.

== History ==
In 1950, the Legal Affairs Commission of the Central People's Government began drafting the Criminal Law. By September 1954, the draft of the Criminal Law of the People's Republic of China and the draft of the Guiding Principles of the Criminal Law of the People's Republic of China had been drafted. In October 1954, the drafting of the Criminal Law of the People's Republic of China officially began, and by June 28, 1957, 22 drafts had been drafted. After that, due to the rise of "leftist" thinking and legal nihilism, criminal legislation work came to a standstill. It was not until 1962, after Mao Zedong criticized legal nihilism at the 7,000-person meeting, that the Legal Affairs Office of the Standing Committee of the National People's Congress continued to draft the law based on the previous 22 drafts in May of the same year. By October 9, 1963, 33 drafts had been written. However, due to the influence of the socialist education movement and the Cultural Revolution, the drafting work was stopped.

After the Cultural Revolution, the newly drafted Criminal Law was revised based on the original 33 drafts in accordance with new situations and problems. The fourth draft was approved in principle by the Politburo of the Chinese Communist Party. After being reviewed and revised by the plenary session of the Legal Affairs Committee of the Standing Committee of the National People's Congress and the eighth session of the Standing Committee of the Fifth National People's Congress, it was submitted to the Second Session of the Fifth National People's Congress for review, revision and supplementation. In March 1979, the Legal Affairs Committee of the NPC Standing Committee formed the fifth draft. Finally, the Criminal Law of the People's Republic of China was adopted by the Second Session of the Fifth National People's Congress on July 1, 1979, promulgated on July 6, 1979, and implemented on January 1, 1980.

== Amendments ==
From the implementation of the Criminal Law in 1980 to the revision of the Criminal Law in 1997, the legislature promulgated 23 separate criminal laws. These separate criminal laws have been included in Annex I and Annex II of the Supplementary Provisions of the Criminal Law revised in 1997, or repealed, or the criminal law parts therein have been repealed:

- "Provisional Regulations of the People's Republic of China on Punishing Servicemen for Violating Their Duties"
- "Decision of the Standing Committee of the National People's Congress on Severely Punishing Criminals Who Seriously Damage the Economy"
- "Decision of the Standing Committee of the National People's Congress on Severely Punishing Criminals Who Seriously Endanger Public Security"
- Supplementary Provisions of the Standing Committee of the National People's Congress on Punishing the Crime of Smuggling
- "Supplementary Provisions of the Standing Committee of the National People's Congress on Punishing Corruption and Bribery"
- "Supplementary Provisions of the Standing Committee of the National People's Congress on Punishing the Crime of Leaking State Secrets"
- Supplementary Provisions of the Standing Committee of the National People's Congress on Punishing Crimes of Killing Precious and Endangered Wildlife Under State Protection
- Decision of the Standing Committee of the National People's Congress on Punishing the Crime of Insulting the National Flag and Emblem of the People's Republic of China
- Supplementary Provisions of the Standing Committee of the National People's Congress on Punishing the Crime of Robbery and Excavation of Ancient Cultural Sites and Tombs
- "Decision of the Standing Committee of the National People's Congress on Punishing Criminals Who Hijack Aircraft"
- Supplementary Provisions of the Standing Committee of the National People's Congress on Punishing Crimes of Counterfeiting Registered Trademarks
- "Decision of the Standing Committee of the National People's Congress on Punishing the Crime of Producing and Selling Counterfeit and Substandard Goods"
- Decision of the Standing Committee of the National People's Congress on Punishing Crimes of Copyright Infringement
- Decision of the Standing Committee of the National People's Congress on Punishing Crimes Violating the Company Law
- Decision of the Standing Committee of the National People's Congress on the handling of prisoners who escape or commit crimes again and those who are undergoing re-education through labor
- Decision of the Standing Committee of the National People's Congress on Drug Prohibition
- "Decision of the Standing Committee of the National People's Congress on Punishing Criminals Who Smuggle, Produce, Sell, and Disseminate Obscene Materials"
- "Decision of the Standing Committee of the National People's Congress on Severely Punishing Criminals Who Traffic and Kidnap Women and Children"
- "Decision of the Standing Committee of the National People's Congress on Strictly Prohibiting Prostitution"
- "Supplementary Provisions of the Standing Committee of the National People's Congress on Punishing Tax Evasion and Tax Resistance Crimes"
- "Supplementary Provisions of the Standing Committee of the National People's Congress on Severe Punishment for Organizing and Transporting Others to Illegal Crossing of the National (Border) Border"
- Decision of the Standing Committee of the National People's Congress on Punishing Crimes that Disrupt Financial Order
- Decision of the Standing Committee of the National People's Congress on Punishing Crimes of Falsely Issuing, Forging and Illegal Selling of Special VAT Invoices

In addition, from 1980 to 1997, there were more than 100 articles on criminal law in administrative law, economic law, and civil law, which are referred to as subsidiary criminal laws in the legal community.

On March 14, 1997, the Fifth Session amended the Criminal Law of the People's Republic of China, which was promulgated on March 14, 1997, and came into effect on October 1, 1997.

Since then, the Criminal Law of the People's Republic of China has been amended several times:

Information on the passage and implementation of previous criminal law amendments
Pass date	Implementation date	Amendment	Passed at
December 25, 1999	December 25, 1999	Amendment to the Criminal Law of the People's Republic of China	The 13th Session of the Standing Committee of the Ninth National People's Congress
August 31, 2001	August 31, 2001	The Second Amendment to the Criminal Law of the People's Republic of China	The 23rd Session of the Standing Committee of the Ninth National People's Congress
December 29, 2001	December 29, 2001	The Third Amendment to the Criminal Law of the People's Republic of China	The 25th Session of the Standing Committee of the Ninth National People's Congress
December 28, 2002	December 28, 2002	Amendment to the Criminal Law of the People 's Republic of China (IV)	The 31st Session of the Standing Committee of the Ninth National People's Congress
February 28, 2005	February 28, 2005	The Fifth Amendment to the Criminal Law of the People's Republic of China	The 14th Session of the Standing Committee of the Tenth National People's Congress
June 29, 2006	June 29, 2006	The Sixth Amendment to the Criminal Law of the People's Republic of China	The 22nd Session of the Standing Committee of the Tenth National People's Congress
February 28, 2009	February 28, 2009	"Amendment (Seventh) to the Criminal Law of the People's Republic of China"	The Seventh Session of the Standing Committee of the Eleventh National People's Congress
August 27, 2009	August 27, 2009	Decision of the Standing Committee of the National People's Congress on Amending Certain Laws	The 10th Session of the Standing Committee of the 11th National People's Congress
February 25, 2011	May 1, 2011	The Eighth Amendment to the Criminal Law of the People's Republic of China	The 19th Session of the Standing Committee of the 11th National People's Congress
August 29, 2015	November 1, 2015	The Ninth Amendment to the Criminal Law of the People's Republic of China	The 16th Session of the Standing Committee of the 12th National People's Congress
November 4, 2017	November 4, 2017	Amendment to the Criminal Law of the People's Republic of China (Tenth)	The 30th Session of the Standing Committee of the 12th National People's Congress
December 26, 2020	March 1, 2021	Amendment to the Criminal Law of the People's Republic of China (XI)	The 24th Session of the Standing Committee of the 13th National People's Congress
December 29, 2023	March 1, 2024	Amendment to the Criminal Law of the People's Republic of China (XII)	The Seventh Session of the 14th National People's Congress Standing Committee

Since the 1997 revision of the Criminal Law, the legislature has enacted 1-2 separate criminal laws, which are listed as one of the amendments to the Criminal Law:

- On December 29, 1998, the "Decision of the Standing Committee of the National People's Congress on Punishing Crimes of Fraudulent Purchase of Foreign Exchange, Foreign Exchange Evasion and Illegal Foreign Exchange Trading" was adopted at the Sixth Session of the Standing Committee of the Ninth National People's Congress and promulgated and implemented on the same day.
- On June 30, 2020, the "Law of the People's Republic of China on Safeguarding National Security in the Hong Kong Special Administrative Region" was passed at the 20th meeting of the Standing Committee of the 13th National People's Congress and promulgated for implementation on the same day. Some scholars believe that this is also a separate criminal law.

== Content ==
Criminal Law of the People's Republic of China

The current version of the Criminal Law of the People's Republic of China, Article 2 of the General Provisions, etc. clearly defines the legislative task: The task of the Criminal Law of the People's Republic of China is to use punishment to fight against all criminal acts in order to safeguard national security, safeguard the people 's democratic dictatorship and the socialist system, protect state-owned property and property collectively owned by the working people, protect citizens' private property, protect citizens' personal rights, democratic rights and other rights, maintain social order and economic order, and ensure the smooth progress of socialist construction.
