= Strait Thunder-2025A =

Chinese military exercise near Taiwan

- Part of the Fourth Taiwan Strait Crisis
- Location: Northwest Pacific Ocean: Taiwan Strait; East China Sea; Philippine Sea; Luzon Strait; South China Sea
- Planned by: China
- Commanded by: Xi Jinping
- Objective: Retaliate against Taiwanese president Lai Ching-te's speech on national security; Test capabilities in regional control, joint blockade, and precision strike
- Date: 1–2 April 2025 (1 day)
- Executed by: People's Liberation Army; Eastern Theater Command
- Outcome: Continuation of the Fourth Taiwan Strait Crisis

The Strait Thunder–2025A (Chinese: 海峽雷霆-2025A) was a military exercise organized by the Eastern Theater Command of the People's Liberation Army of the People's Republic of China from 1–2 April 2025, involving the command's land, sea, air, and rocket forces. The exercise was conducted in the vicinity of the Matsu Islands and the main island of Taiwan. The drill on 2 April was held in the central and southern parts of the Taiwan Strait. This was China's seventh major military drill targeting Taiwan since August 2022.

== Background ==
On 26 February 2025, shortly before the exercise, the People's Liberation Army Navy conducted an unannounced exercise off the coast of Kaohsiung and Pingtung. The exercise included live-fire drills. At least 32 aircraft and several warships participated in the exercise, of which 22 crossed the median line of the Taiwan Strait and its extension, entering the airspace north of Taiwan and its surrounding waters. This exercise was not announced in advance, and the code name of the operation was not made public. It was widely regarded as simulating a surprise attack. The Republic of China's navy, army, and air force were placed on alert. The next day, the Premier of the Executive Yuan of the Republic of China, Cho Jung-tai, expressed hope that mainland China would exercise restraint in such actions and instructed the armed forces to remain vigilant against various developments in the surrounding areas. The Ministry of National Defense of the Republic of China also condemned the PLA's behavior. On the same day, Senior Colonel Wu Qian, Director of the Information Bureau of the Ministry of National Defense and spokesman for the Ministry of National Defense, criticized the US attempt to "use Taiwan to contain China" and the Taiwan Democratic Progressive Party authorities' attempt to "rely on the US to seek independence" and "resist unification by force" at a regular press conference when answering questions about Taiwan's recent "Han Kuang Exercise." He said to the Taiwan side, "Trying to stop a chariot with a mantis arm will only lead to its own destruction. Sooner or later, we will come to take you away."

On 13 March, President Lai Ching-te of the Republic of China delivered a speech after a national security meeting held on the eve of the 20th anniversary of the 2005 Anti-Secession Law. In addition to proposing 17 response strategies for addressing the national security and united front threats facing Taiwan, he also described China as "foreign hostile forces" under the Anti-Infiltration Act.

On 1 April, Republic of China Minister of National Defense Gu Lixiong stated that since 29 March, the movements of the aircraft carrier Shandong formation and other aircraft and ships had been gradually monitored, and that on 31 March they entered the National Armed Forces' "response zone", indicating that the People's Liberation Army had begun preparing for military operations since the end of March.

== Military Exercise Process ==
=== 1 April ===
On 1 April, Zhu Anqing, spokesperson for the East China Sea Branch of the China Coast Guard, stated that multiple Coast Guard fleets organized law enforcement patrols in the waters around Taiwan, including exercises involving spot inspections, arrests, interception, and detention. The Fujian Coast Guard organized a fleet of ships to conduct comprehensive law enforcement patrols in the waters near Dongyin Island and Wuqiu Island.

On the morning of 1 April, the Eastern Theater Command Media Center released three posters in Traditional Chinese characters with themes such as "Advance," "Deterrence and Closure," and "Destruction and Paralysis", as well as an animation titled "Shell." The animation portrayed Lai Ching-te as using "peace," "freedom," "democracy," and "prosperity" as a cover to "de-Chiangize" his country, formulate the "17 National Security Regulations" of "green terror" to persecute political opponents (such as Ko Wen-je and Kao An-kuo), increase military purchases, and rely on the United States to seek "independence" and sell out Taiwan. In the animation, Lai Ching-te was depicted as a worm being roasted over a fire. This was the first time since Chiang Kai-shek that the Chinese Communist Party had vilified a major Taiwanese leader in this manner. On the same day, the Eastern Theater Command released an animation titled "Exorcising Demons and Demons", which used material from the 2024 game Black Myth: Wukong. The video showed Taipei 101 and Hankou Street, as well as satellite positioning locked onto Taiwan, and simulated missile attacks on Zhongzheng District in Taipei City, where the Presidential Palace of the Republic of China is located. This was the first time that the People's Liberation Army had clearly disclosed its intended target in this way. However, Taiwan's China Times considered the video to have a stronger "internal propaganda" character. The exercise video released by official media showed for the first time the so-called H-6K bomber carrying the Eagle Strike 21 anti-ship missile, which is considered capable of effectively preventing US military intervention. According to data from the Ministry of National Defense of the Republic of China, at least 76 PLA military aircraft (37 of which crossed the median line of the Taiwan Strait), 15 warships, and 4 government ships approached Taiwan that day.

=== 2 April ===
At a time when the outside world generally believed that this was a sudden, unannounced military exercise with no publicly known name, like the one in February 2024, the Eastern Theater Command officially announced the code name of this exercise, "Strait Thunder-2025A," on 2 April, the second day of the exercise. However, the exercise began on 2 April, and its scope included only the "relevant waters in the central and southern parts of the Taiwan Strait". The training subjects were "verification and identification, warning and expulsion, interception and detention, etc.", which differed from the previously announced timing, scope, and subjects. This indicates that "Strait Thunder" was not the code name of the entire exercise and that the exercise on 1 April was not part of "Strait Thunder".

On 2 April, the Eastern Theater Command of the People's Liberation Army conducted a long-range live-fire exercise in the relevant waters of the East China Sea in accordance with the exercise plan, striking simulated targets such as important ports and energy facilities. The Shandong aircraft carrier formation was in the waters and airspace east of Taiwan Island, conducting exercises with naval and air forces on subjects such as ship-aircraft coordination, regional air control, and sea and land strikes. Zhang Chi, a professor at the People's Liberation Army National Defense University (China), said that the Shandong aircraft carrier formation's participation in the exercise showed that the PLA's ability to respond quickly, strike with precision, and coordinate its forces was constantly improving. The presence of the aircraft carrier fleet in the area east of Taiwan could help block the "Taiwan independence" forces' lifeline for energy imports, support line for obtaining foreign aid, and escape route for evading sanctions. Later, the Eastern Theater Command simulated an attack on the Yong'an LNG Terminal in Kaohsiung using the PHL-16. As a result, the trajectory of the cargo ship Ebisu, which was transporting natural gas to the Taichung LNG Terminal, was suspected of having been affected by the exercise. The Ministry of Economic Affairs of the Republic of China clarified the situation. However, the Eastern Theater Command had identified the energy facilities in the Republic of China as priority targets for destruction. In addition, the People's Liberation Army (PLA) conducted long-range live-fire exercises in the East China Sea. The Ministry of National Defense of the Republic of China stated that on that day, at least 59 PLA aircraft, 31 of which crossed the median line of the strait and entered the northern, central, southwestern, and eastern airspace, and 23 warships approached Taiwan. Images released by the Coast Guard Administration (Taiwan) at a press conference confirmed that China Coast Guard Ship 2305 had entered the 24-nautical-mile zone adjacent to Taiwan Island. Yuyuan Tantian, a social media account affiliated with China Central Television, said that the closest drill came within 20 nautical miles of Taiwan.

On 2 April, the Eastern Theater Command released a poster titled "Lockdown". The official account of the People's Liberation Army News and Communication Center, "Jun Zhengping Studio", published a commentary titled "Taiwan independence means war, don't say I didn't warn you". The China Coast Guard released a themed video titled "Clean Sea" about law enforcement and control around Taiwan Island.

=== 3 April ===
On 3 April, the People's Liberation Army Daily published a commentary signed by "Jun Sheng" entitled "Separatist provocations will be severely punished, and the reunification of the motherland will surely be realized", which directly called Lai Ching-te a "trouble maker", "danger maker", and "war maker". The People's Daily published a commentary signed by "Zhong Yiping" entitled "Resolutely punish Lai Ching-te and do our utmost to defend peace in the Taiwan Strait", stating that "every time the Lai Ching-te administration provokes, military deterrence will be further advanced".

At 6:47 a.m. on 3 April, a U.S. Navy P-8 Poseidon maritime patrol aircraft was warned by a People's Liberation Army Navy warship while flying in the airspace near the waters off the Hengchun Peninsula in Pingtung County, Taiwan. The warship said: "You have entered the 24-nautical-mile contiguous zone of China Taiwan, adjust your route and leave." The crew of the P-8 Poseidon responded: "We are conducting a legitimate military operation in international airspace."

== Reactions ==
=== China ===
Zhu Fenglian, spokesperson for the Taiwan Affairs Office of the Central Committee of the Chinese Communist Party, stated that the joint exercises conducted by the Eastern Theater Command of the People's Liberation Army around Taiwan Island were a resolute punishment for the Lai Ching-te administration's "rampant provocations" in seeking "Taiwan independence". According to the Taiwan Affairs Office of the CPC Central Committee, this was described as a solemn warning to the "Taiwan independence" separatist forces deliberately undermining peace in the Taiwan Strait and as a necessary measure to safeguard national sovereignty and territorial integrity.

Guo Jiakun, spokesperson for the Ministry of Foreign Affairs of the People's Republic of China, responded to the remarks by various countries and international organizations at regular press conferences over three consecutive days:

- Guo Jiakun stated at a regular press conference on 1 April that China's joint exercises were a serious warning and powerful deterrent to the separatist forces of "Taiwan independence", and were a legitimate and necessary action to defend national sovereignty and maintain national unity.
- In response to the criticism from the United States, the European Union, and Japan of the military exercises, Guo Jiakun responded at a regular press conference on 2 April, accusing these countries and organizations of condoning and supporting separatist actions by "Taiwan independence" forces, undermining regional stability, and splitting China. He urged them to follow what he described as the general trend of the international community by upholding the One-China principle, abiding by the political commitments made to China, respecting China's sovereignty and territorial integrity, and opposing any form of "Taiwan independence". At the same time, he stated that the joint exercises are a resolute punishment for the Lai Ching-te administration's pursuit of "independence", a solemn warning to the separatist forces of "Taiwan independence" that deliberately undermine peace in the Taiwan Strait, and a responsible move to defend national sovereignty, security, and territorial integrity. Guo Jiakun also responded to remarks made by the Chief of Staff of the Armed Forces of the Philippines, saying that resolving the political status of Taiwan is the Chinese people's own business and that no one else should interfere. He advised the Philippines not to provoke China and firmly opposed what he described as unfounded remarks that distorted the truth and slandered the country.
- On 3 April, in response to the remarks made by Japanese Chief Cabinet Secretary Yoshimasa Hayashi, Guo Jiakun reiterated the legitimacy of the exercise and criticized Japan for interfering in China's internal affairs. He also pointed out that Japan had colonized and enslaved Taiwan for 50 years and said that Japan should be more cautious in its words and deeds. 2025 marks the 80th anniversary of the end of World War II and the Second Sino-Japanese War. China urged Japan to reflect on history, abide by the four political documents between China and Japan, and adhere to the One-China principle.
- On 6 April, a spokesperson for the Chinese Embassy in Canada responded to remarks by the foreign ministers of the Group of Seven (G7) countries and the EU senior representative, saying that a small number of countries and organizations had disregarded facts, reversed right and wrong, and openly interfered in China's internal affairs. The spokesperson said that China strongly opposed the remarks and would not accept them. China urged the relevant countries and organizations to follow what it described as the general trend of the international community by upholding the One-China principle, abiding by the political commitments made to China, and immediately stopping interference in China's internal affairs on the Taiwan issue.

=== Republic of China (Taiwan) ===
- President Lai Ching-te of the Republic of China instructed national security and defense agencies to closely monitor the situation and maintain a comprehensive understanding of relevant developments. China has continued to engage in unilateral actions, including military provocations and maritime gray-zone harassment, in the vicinity of the Taiwan Strait and throughout the Indo-Pacific region. The Presidential Office described China as a troublemaker to the international community and strongly condemned its actions. Premier Zhuo Rongtai said that the defense agencies would remain highly vigilant. Amid changing international economic and trade conditions, all governments should continue to care about social stability and people's lives in their countries. He said that a progressive society should not blindly display military power abroad.
- Minister Gu Lixiong of the Ministry of National Defense said that the Republic of China Armed Forces were monitoring developments and that a response center had been established at 9 a.m. on 1 April. He said that the situation would be assessed and that the response mechanism had been activated to respond appropriately. The Ministry of National Defense said that between 6 am on 31 March and 6 am on 1 April, 19 ships had been detected operating around the Taiwan Strait, and released videos and photos showing the ROCS Su Ao, Tian Dan, F-16AM/BM Block 20 fighter taking pictures of the Shandong, Yinchuan, and other ships. Gu Lixiong also pointed out that the People's Liberation Army has problems with corruption and should solve its internal problems instead of taking actions that undermine the peace and stability of the region.
- Liang Wenjie, vice chairman of the Mainland Affairs Council of the Republic of China, strongly condemned the CCP's joint exercises around Taiwan, saying that they seriously undermined peace and stability in the Taiwan Strait and the region and constituted continued military intimidation of Taiwan. He said that the CCP is a "hostile foreign force."
- Kuomintang Chairman Eric Chu strongly condemned the military exercises against Taiwan while presiding over the Central Standing Committee Meeting on 2 April. He emphasized that the two sides of the Taiwan Strait share the same culture and should maintain peace. He said that the military actions and exercises recently carried out by the PLA had not helped the cross-strait relations, had seriously damaged public sentiment, and had not contributed to the stability of the region. He said that the Kuomintang firmly opposed any disruption of the regional balance or cross-strait peace. He also condemned what he described as the Democratic Progressive Party's behavior of forgetting its ancestors, excluding dissidents, relying on American forces, and undermining cross-strait peace and harmony ahead of the upcoming Qingming Festival.

=== United States, Japan, Republic of Korea ===
U.S. Secretary of State Marco Rubio, Japanese Foreign Minister Takeshi Iwaya, and South Korean Foreign Minister Cho Tae-yul held trilateral talks and emphasized the importance of maintaining peace and stability across the Taiwan Strait as an indispensable factor for the security and prosperity of the international community. The United States, Japan, and South Korea expressed concern about China's provocative actions, particularly the recent military exercises around Taiwan, and called on China to stop further destabilizing actions. They also encouraged the peaceful resolution of cross-strait issues and opposed any unilateral attempts to change the status quo through force or coercion. They also expressed support for Taiwan's meaningful participation in appropriate international organizations.

=== G7+European Union ===
On the afternoon of 6 April, the foreign ministers of the Group of Seven (G7) and Kaja Kallas, Vice President of the European Commission and High Representative of the European Union for Foreign Affairs and Security Policy, issued a joint statement expressing deep concern about China's provocative activities, particularly the recent large-scale military exercises around Taiwan. The statement said that the G7 foreign ministers of Canada, France, Germany, Italy, Japan, the United Kingdom, and the United States, along with the EU High Representative, shared this concern. These increasingly frequent and destabilizing activities have increased tensions across the Taiwan Strait and endangered global security and prosperity. G7 members and the broader international community expressed concern about maintaining peace and stability in the Taiwan Strait. They opposed any unilateral actions that threatened to undermine peace and stability, including through the use of force or coercion. G7 members continued to encourage the two sides of the Taiwan Strait to resolve their differences peacefully through constructive dialogue.

=== United States ===
- CNN commented that the military exercise was a test of U.S. resolve. The article cited analysis from Taiwan that the military exercise was timed to coincide with the end of U.S. Defense Secretary Pete Hegseth's first trip to Asia and the resumption of the U.S.-China trade war and trade negotiations. According to the analysis, Taiwan was used as a pretext for the military exercise, but Beijing intended to send a signal to Washington.
- U.S. State Department spokeswoman Tammy Bruce issued a statement saying that China's aggressive military activities and rhetoric toward Taiwan would only increase tensions and put the regional security and global prosperity at risk. The statement said that, in the face of China's intimidation tactics and destabilizing behavior, the United States' enduring commitment to its allies and partners, including Taiwan, remained unchanged. The United States supports peace and stability in the Taiwan Strait and opposes unilateral changes to the status quo, including through force or coercion.
- White House Press Secretary Karoline Leavitt said at a White House press briefing that the United States reaffirmed its opposition to any unilateral attempt to change the status quo in the Taiwan Strait by force or coercion. President Donald Trump emphasized the importance of maintaining peace across the Taiwan Strait. The U.S. encouraged the peaceful resolution of cross-strait issues. The White House National Security Council also issued a briefing on the matter and reiterated its opposition to any unilateral attempts to alter the status quo through coercive means.
- A spokesperson for the American Institute in Taiwan (AIT) said in an interview with the Central News Agency that the United States was closely monitoring China's military activities around Taiwan. The spokesperson said that China's increasing use of military coercion would escalate tensions and undermine peace and stability across the Taiwan Strait. The spokesperson also said that China had once again demonstrated itself to be an irresponsible actor, showing no concern for the risks posed to regional security and prosperity. The spokesperson said there was no justification for China to carry out threatening or militarily coercive actions around Taiwan. The United States would continue to support Taiwan in the face of military, economic, informational, and diplomatic pressure from China.
- On 26 March, U.S.-China military expert and Department of Defense advisor Oriana Skylar Mastro stated during a Senate hearing that the PLA might be ready to take Taiwan within the next three to four years, with the aim of seizing control within three to four weeks. She recommended that Taiwan increase its defense spending to around 3.4% of its GDP and develop the capability to delay a PLA amphibious landing for at least 30 days. Some Taiwanese netizens responded critically, saying, "The politicians would flee in three days," and "Ukraine waited for three years and saw no one show up."

=== Japan ===
On 1 April, Japan's Chief Cabinet Secretary Yoshimasa Hayashi stated that the Japanese government was highly concerned about the People's Liberation Army's recent military exercises and was actively collecting and analyzing intelligence. He said that Japan had also conveyed its concerns to China and that peace and stability in the Taiwan Strait were extremely important to the international community, including Japan. Due to China's frequent military activities around Taiwan in recent years, the Japanese government had increased its vigilance and surveillance of the seas and airspace surrounding Japan and was making thorough preparations.

=== European Union ===
- A spokesperson for the European External Action Service (EEAS) issued a statement saying that China's large-scale military exercises around Taiwan were escalating tensions across the Taiwan Strait. The statement said that peace and stability in the Taiwan Strait held strategic significance for regional and global security and prosperity. It also said that the European Union had a direct interest in maintaining the status quo in the Taiwan Strait and opposed any unilateral actions to change it through force or coercion. The EU called on all parties to exercise restraint and avoid actions that could further escalate tensions, emphasizing that these issues should be resolved through cross-strait dialogue.
- On 2 April, the European Parliament adopted a resolution as part of its assessment report on the European Union's Common Foreign and Security Policy (CFSP). The resolution contains multiple condemnations of China's coercive actions in the Taiwan Strait and the South China Sea. It also criticizes CCP General Secretary Xi Jinping for refusing to renounce the use of force against Taiwan. The resolution emphasizes that "achieving unification through coercive measures" violates international law.

=== Germany ===
- At a German federal press conference, German Federal Foreign Office spokesperson Kathrin Deschauer said that Germany was very concerned and closely monitoring the situation. She was referring to a new large-scale military exercise conducted by the People's Liberation Army and the China Coast Guard around Taiwan. She stated that such exercises, especially those announced with little notice, increase tensions in the region and have an impact on the stability of the Taiwan Strait. Deschauer said that Germany's objective was to maintain peace and stability in the Taiwan Strait, which holds strategic significance not only for Europe but also beyond the region. She said that this concerned international security and prosperity, which directly affected both Germany's and Europe's interests. Therefore, Germany had a direct interest in preserving the status quo in the Taiwan Strait. Any changes in the Taiwan Strait must come through peaceful means and mutual agreement. Germany expected the People's Republic of China to act as a responsible international actor and avoid actions that would further increase tensions and destabilize regional peace.
- The German Federal Foreign Office also issued a statement on the social media platform X, expressing concern over the rising tensions caused by China's military exercises around Taiwan. The statement emphasized that the stability in the Taiwan Strait was crucial for regional and global security, and also affected Europe's prosperity. It reiterated that the status quo could only be changed through peaceful means and mutual agreement, not by force or coercion.

=== United Kingdom ===
- A spokesperson for the United Kindom's Foreign, Commonwealth and Development Office (FCDO) issued a statement expressing concern over China's military exercises near Taiwan. The statement described the exercises as part of a broader pattern of activity that was escalating tensions and posed a risk of further escalation in the Taiwan Strait.
- The UK reaffirmed its interest in the peace and stability of the Taiwan Strait, emphasizing that they were essential for global prosperity. The UK also reiterated its support for a Free and Open Indo-Pacific. The statement stressed that the Taiwan issue should be resolved peacefully through constructive dialogue between the people on both sides of the Taiwan Strait, free from threats, force, or coercion.

=== Canada ===
Global Affairs Canada issued a statement on the social media platforms X and Facebook, expressing deep concern over China's recent military exercises near Taiwan. The statement noted that these provocative actions had escalated tensions, undermined regional stability, and impacted global security and prosperity. Canada called on China to resolve cross-strait differences through peaceful means, emphasizing the importance of dialogue over confrontation.

=== Sweden ===
Swedish Minister for Defence Pål Jonson responded in writing to a parliamentary inquiry, stating that China's actions toward Taiwan were concerning and that military threats were unacceptable. He emphasized that differences across the Taiwan Strait must be resolved peacefully and with respect for the will of the people of Taiwan. Jonson further stated that it was in Sweden's interest to help prevent states with military power from undermining the rules-based international order and violating international norms and regulations. He noted that Sweden was in dialogue with its NATO allies on how NATO could strengthen collective defense in the Euro-Atlantic area, which falls within NATO's area of responsibility. In addition, Sweden maintained strong bilateral cooperation with partners in the Indo-Pacific region and was working within the frameworks of the European Union and NATO to enhance defense policy cooperation with those regional partners.

=== Australia ===
- The Australian Department of Foreign Affairs and Trade issued a statement expressing deep concern over China's military and coast guard exercises near Taiwan. The statement said that Australia strongly opposed actions that increased the risk of accidents, miscalculation, and escalation. It reiterated Australia's view that these military drills were disproportionate and destabilizing. The statement said that disputes should be resolved through dialogue, not through threats, the use of force, or coercion. It also said that Australia did not want to see any unilateral changes to the status quo across the Taiwan Strait. Peace and stability across the Strait are in the interest of all. Australian officials had raised their concerns directly with their Chinese counterparts.

=== Philippines ===
- On 1 April, Chief of Staff of the Armed Forces of the Philippines General Romeo S. Brawner Jr. warned the Armed Forces of the Philippines to prepare for the possibility of a mainland Chinese attack on Taiwan. He stated that the Philippines would be "at the forefront of rescue operations" in such a scenario. General Brawner emphasized that if a conflict broke out in the Taiwan Strait, Manila would inevitably be drawn into the situation, and preparations would need to be made to evacuate the approximately 250,000 Filipino workers currently residing and working in Taiwan.

== See also ==
- 2022 Chinese military exercises around Taiwan
- 2023 Chinese military exercises around Taiwan
- Justice Mission 2025
