= Fourth Taiwan Strait Crisis =

Period of heightened tension between the PRC and ROC since 2022

← 3rd Fourth Taiwan Strait Crisis
- Part of the cross-strait conflict and the effects of the Russo-Ukrainian war (2022–present)
- Locations of the combined operational zones utilized by the PLA for their military drills (see fullscreen for more locations in the East China Sea)
Date	2 August 2022 – present (4 years, 3 months, 2 weeks and 2 days)
Location	Northwest Pacific Ocean: Taiwan Strait; East China Sea; Philippine Sea; Luzon Strait; South China Sea
Status	Ongoing: Cross-strait relations deteriorate; Further diplomatic tensions between the People's Republic of China and the United States and Japan; People's Republic of China conducts military exercises to simulate a blockade

Belligerents
People's Republic of China	Republic of China (Taiwan)

Commanders and leaders
(China) Xi Jinping; (China) Zhang Youxia (until 2026); (China) Zhang Shengmin (since 2025); (China) He Weidong (2023–2025); (China) Xu Qiliang (until 2023); (China) Dong Jun (since 2023); (China) Wei Fenghe (until 2023)	Lai Ching-te (since 2024); Tsai Ing-wen (until 2024); (Taiwan) Mei Chia-shu (since 2023); (Taiwan) Chen Pao-yu (until 2023); (Taiwan) Wellington Koo (since 2024); (Taiwan) Chiu Kuo-cheng (until 2024)

Units involved
People's Liberation Army; (China) Eastern Theater Command; (China) Eastern Theater Command Ground Force; (China) Eastern Theater Command Navy; (China) Eastern Theater Command Air Force; People's Liberation Army Rocket Force; People's Armed Police; China Coast Guard	Republic of China Armed Forces; Republic of China Army; Republic of China Navy; Republic of China Air Force; Republic of China Military Police; Ocean Affairs Council; Coast Guard Administration

The Fourth Taiwan Strait Crisis (traditional Chinese: 第四次臺海危機; simplified Chinese: 第四次台海危机) is an ongoing conflict between the People's Republic of China (PRC) and Taiwan, officially the Republic of China (ROC), with the PRC conducting several large-scale military exercises that encircled Taiwan. The PRC initiated military maneuvers around Taiwan on 2 August 2022, before launching their first major military drill on 4–11 August 2022, which was carried out by China in response to US speaker of the House Nancy Pelosi's visit to Taiwan amidst the backdrop of the Russian invasion of Ukraine that began months earlier. The drills involved live-fire drills, air sorties, naval deployments, and ballistic missile launches by the People's Liberation Army (PLA), marking China's biggest escalation in the region since the Third Taiwan Strait Crisis in 1996.

China's military drills were shows of force intended to deter what the PRC perceives as US meddling in its internal affairs, and to demonstrate Chinese military power in the region for both international and domestic audiences. The drills drew backlash from the G7 (Group of 7) nations. The live-fire drills observed during the seminal August 2022 military exercise were unprecedented in recent history, and took place in seven zones that surrounded the island's busiest international waterways and aviation routes. The first drill came to an end on 11 August 2022.

Since then, China has launched at least seven more major military drills targeting Taiwan, with PLA exercises, maritime patrols and even Coast Guard boardings around the Taiwan Strait becoming routine in what has been defined as "grey-zone tactics". The PRC also declared sovereignty over all airspace above and around the island, publicly renouncing the Davis line, an imaginary median line across the Taiwan Strait.

== Background ==
=== Origins ===
In 1912, following the abdication of the Qing dynasty, the Republic of China was proclaimed. The unstable China entered a civil war in 1927 between Chiang Kai-shek's Kuomintang and Mao Zedong's Communist Party (CCP). Having begun as a rebel group, the CCP took control of Northeastern China before the conflict was suspended due to the Second Sino-Japanese War (1937–1945). The civil war resumed after Japan's surrender with the CCP conquering most of modern-day mainland China and Mao proclaiming the People's Republic of China on 1 October 1949. Defeated, Chiang and over one million followers retreated to the island of Taiwan where the Republic of China never ceased.

The PRC argues that the island of Taiwan is an "inalienable part of China" and had been so since the period of the Three Kingdoms in the 3rd century BCE and that Taiwan was made a Chinese province in 1885 under Qing Emperor Guangxu. According to their claim, China had been stripped of Taiwan in 1895 owing to the First Sino-Japanese War, when it was forced to cede Taiwan and Penghu islands. Having the old ROC abrogated all the previous treaties with Japan in the 1943 Cairo Declaration, Taiwan should have been returned to China after the end of World War II. The Potsdam Declaration, signed in 1945 by China itself, ruled that the Cairo Declaration "should be carried out" and the ROC reobtained Taiwan on 25 October 1945. According to the PRC's The Taiwan Question and China's Reunification in the New Era, being considered the legitimate successor of the ROC, the People's Republic should exert full sovereignty over Taiwan. Chinese Foreign Minister Wang Yi stated that the Resolution 2758, ratified by the United Nations in 1971, recognized the PRC's succession and ruled out the possibility of there being two Chinas or one China and one Taiwan.

Conversely, the PRC government has never ruled Taiwan, and a number of major powers such as the United States do not recognize the PRC's claims over Taiwan. Since 1979, the US has maintained a policy of "strategic ambiguity", neither endorsing China's claims over Taiwan nor recognizing Taiwan as an independent nation, and also refusing to state outright whether or not it would defend Taiwan militarily from a Chinese attack. However, the US is also bound by the Taiwan Relations Act to provide Taiwan with the means to defend itself from an attack.

=== Incursions into Taiwan ADIZ ===
Since September 2020, the Ministry of National Defense of Taiwan (MND) began reporting PLA sorties in its Air Defence Identification Zone (ADIZ) that flew beyond mainland territorial airspace, which are considered by analysts to be part of a salami-slicing/swarming strategy and show of force in the region. PLA aircraft entered Taiwan's ADIZ on nearly 250 days in the 12 months between September 2020 and 2021, and the PRC's 2021 National Day celebrations saw a record number of 148 aircraft operating inside Taiwan's ADIZ over the course of four days. Most of these incursions, some of which included nuclear-capable bombers, took place in the southwestern part of the ADIZ following major events related to Taiwan's international space. In a biennial report released in November 2021, the ROC Ministry of Defense warned that the PRC had obtained the capacity to surround and blockade the island's harbors, airports, and outbound flight routes.

=== Escalation of tensions ===
On 9 January 2021, the US State Department under Mike Pompeo announced that it was Lifting Self-Imposed Restrictions on the U.S.-Taiwan Relationship, drawing protest from the PRC.

On 10 June 2022, PRC Defense Minister Wei Fenghe warned that "if anyone dares to split Taiwan from China, the Chinese army will definitely not hesitate to start a war", adding that it "would have no choice but to fight ... and crush any attempt of Taiwan independence" to safeguard "national sovereignty and territorial integrity." U.S. secretary of defense Lloyd Austin responded by condemning China's "provocative, destabilising" military activity near Taiwan.

The week before Nancy Pelosi's visit, General Secretary of the Chinese Communist Party Xi Jinping warned U.S. president Joe Biden in a phone call that Washington should abide by the One China principle and that "those who play with fire will perish by it". Biden told reporters that U.S. military officials believed Pelosi's visit was "not a good idea right now".

== Timeline ==
=== August 2022 ===
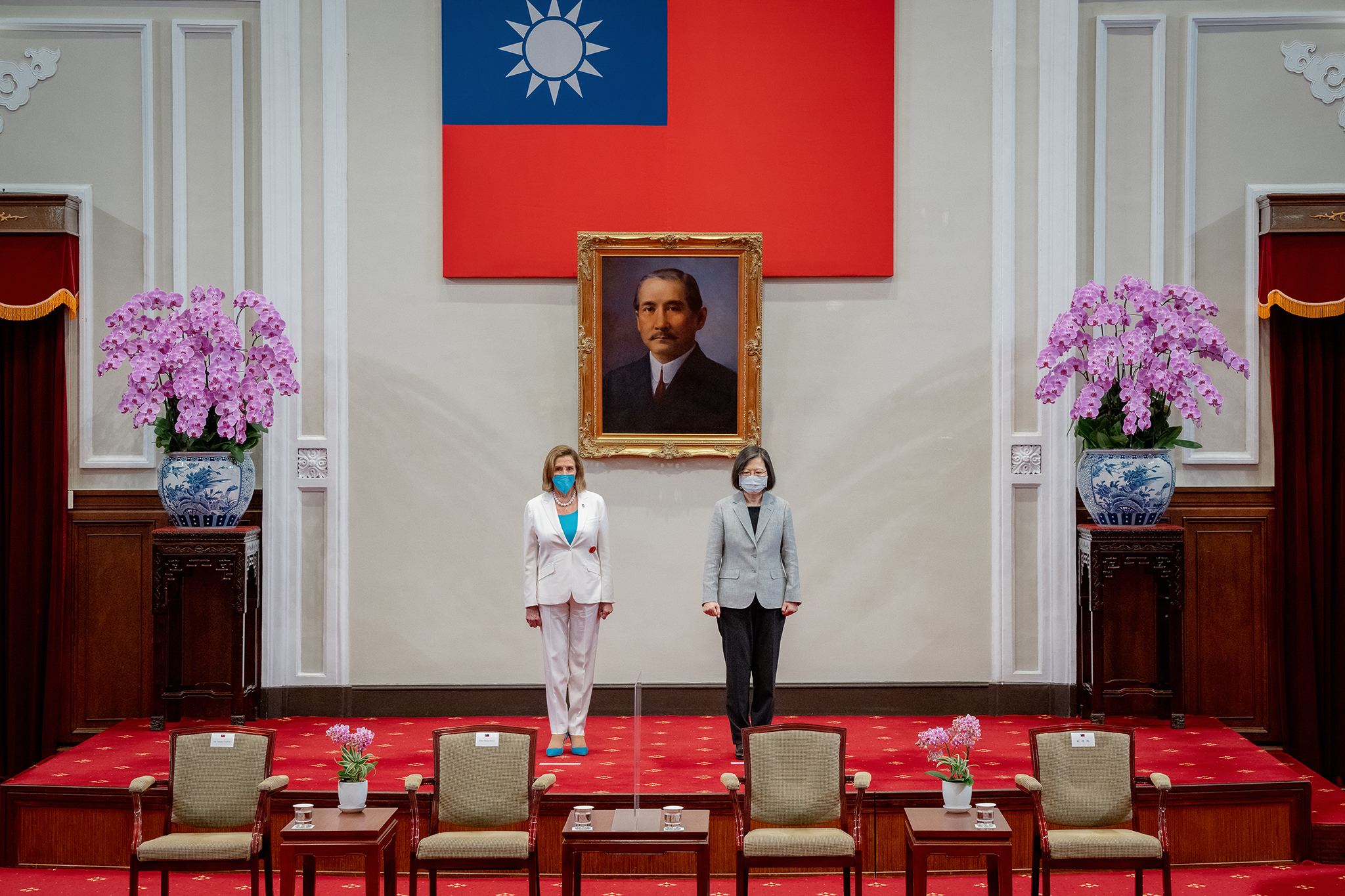
ROC president Tsai Ing-wen hosting US Speaker Nancy Pelosi and her entourage.

Tsai Ing-wen delivers remarks on the live-fire military exercises China conducting in areas around Taiwan.

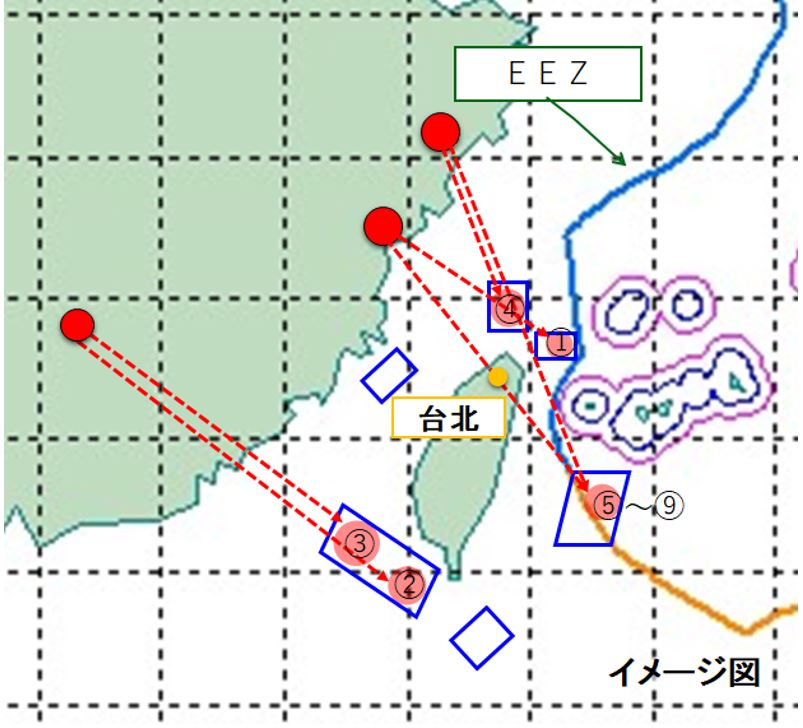
Estimated trajectory of the Chinese ballistic missile launches (source: Japanese Ministry of Defense, published on 4 August 2022).

On 2 August, in response to Pelosi's visit, the People's Republic of China announced four days of military live-fire drills, in six zones that encircled the island on the busiest international waterways and aviation routes. In response to the announcement, ROC officials complained that the PLA's live-fire drills were an invasion of Taiwan's territorial space and a direct challenge to free air and sea navigation. That same day, China began conducting significant military movements around Taiwan. Two days later, on 4 August, China added a seventh zone for their military drill, and they launched a week of full-scale military drills around Taiwan. On 4 August, Taiwanese troops fired flares to drive away drones that flew above the Kinmen Islands. In a show of strength, the PRC deployed both a carrier group, as well as at least one nuclear submarine to the Taiwan Strait, with both the carrier group as well as the nuclear submarine participating in the live-fire drills. The PRC announced additional live-fire drills in both the Yellow and Bohai Sea, and China's Maritime Safety Administration announced five restricted areas in the Yellow Sea where exercises were to happen from 5 August to 15 August, as well as four additional zones in the Bohai Sea, where a month of PRC military operations were scheduled to happen starting from 8 August.

China fired 11 missiles into waters surrounding Taiwan during the live-fire drills, at least several of which were Dongfeng ballistic missiles, double the number fired in July 1995, during the Third Taiwan Strait Crisis. Several missiles reportedly flew over Taiwan. Japan reported that five of the missiles landed in its exclusive economic zone, southwest of the Yaeyama Islands. According to the Japanese Ministry of Defense, this is the first time ballistic missiles launched by China had landed in Japan's exclusive economic zone. The scale and intensity of these military exercises were significantly more severe than those of the Third Taiwan Strait Crisis, with the August 2022 drills having more military closure boxes, which were situated much closer to Taiwan and bracketed far more of the island, missiles fired directly over Taiwan for the first time, and more intensive military maneuvers.

While the PLA live-fire exercises were ongoing on 4 August, the US carrier strike group of the USS Ronald Reagan was conducting military operations in the Philippine Sea, including waters to the southeast of Taiwan. However, the US also cancelled the planned test launch of a Minuteman III missile, which was scheduled to happen during the same week the crisis started, in order to avoid escalating tensions with China further.

In response to the PRC drills, on 7 August, the ROC government announced that it would be conducting live-fire artillery exercises in Pingtung County which served to act as both retaliation to the recent PRC live-fire exercises around Taiwan and test combat readiness. At first, the PRC seemed to wrap up its military drills according to its original schedule published on 4 August. During drills held in Lienchiang County, flares fired by Taiwan's army started a fire. However, on Monday, 8 August, China's Eastern Theater Command announced it would continue its drills, which includes anti-submarine attacks and sea raid operations, without announcing an ending date. On 10 August, the Eastern Theatre Command announced an end to the military exercises, after they had "successfully completed various tasks and effectively tested the integrated combat capabilities of the troops". However, the Eastern Theatre Command also announced it would carry out regular "patrols in the direction of the Taiwan Strait."

=== April 2023 (Joint Sword) ===
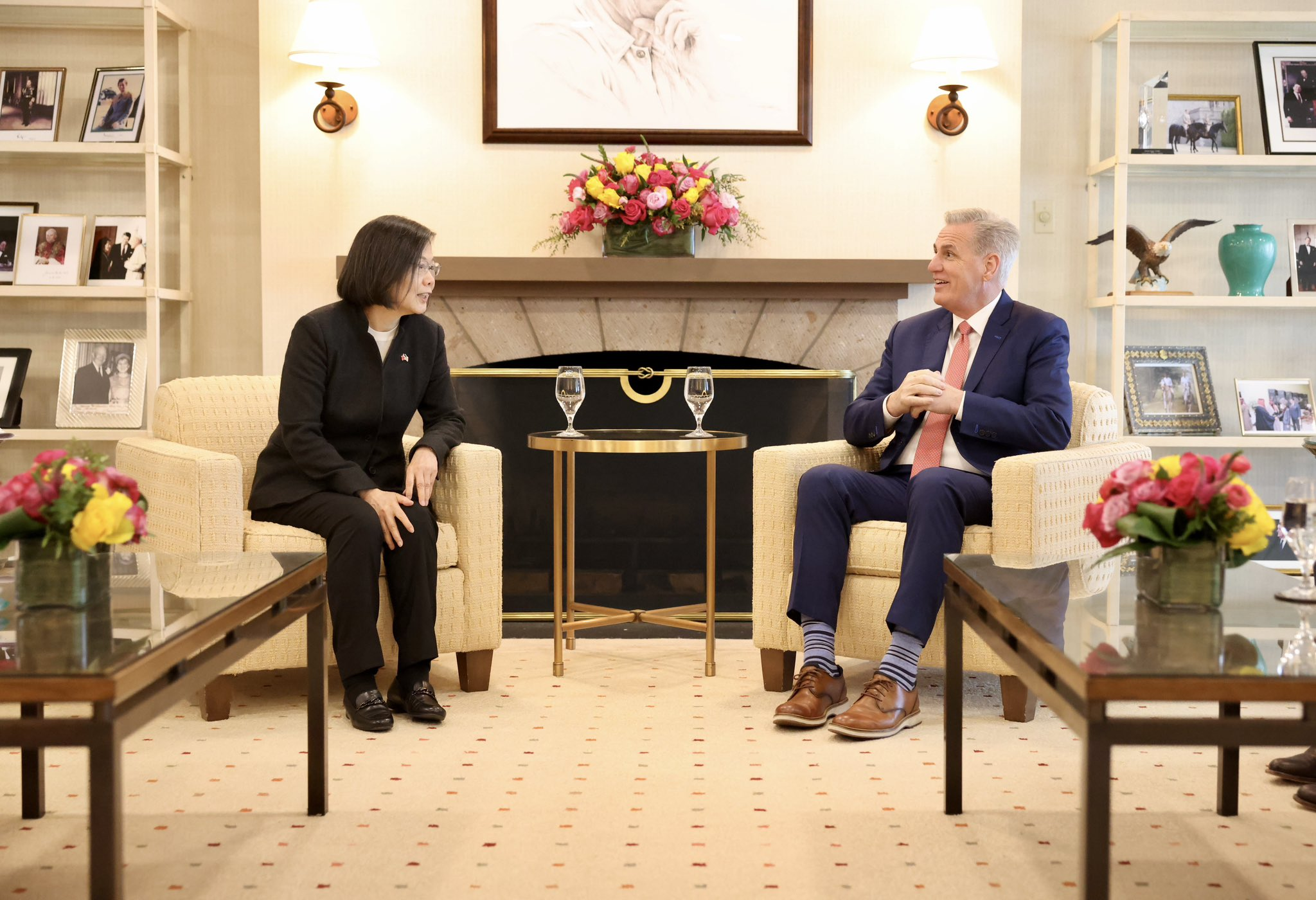
U.S. Speaker McCarthy with Taiwan president Tsai Ing-wen, April 2023

On 4 March 2023, US Speaker of the House Kevin McCarthy announced that he had planned a meeting with Taiwanese president Tsai Ing-wen in the U.S. After his announcement, the PLA threatened to take serious action against Tsai if she met with McCarthy.

Despite the threats, Tsai arrived in the U.S. on 5 April and met with McCarthy and other prominent U.S. lawmakers. The meeting took place at the Ronald Reagan Presidential Library.

Hours after Tsai's meeting, a congressional delegation consisting of Representative Michael McCaul, chair of the Foreign Affairs Committee, arrived in Taipei in their third overseas visit. During their stop, McCaul stated: "we stand here today not as Republicans or Democrats, but as Americans in strong support of Taiwan". He also compared CCP General Secretary Xi Jinping with Adolf Hitler, a remark that sparked controversy. In response, the Chinese Communist Party (CCP) sanctioned McCaul.

On 8 April 2023, the PLA announced the start of three days of "combat readiness patrols" (战备警巡) encircling Taiwan, naming the exercises "Joint Sword" (联合利剑). That same day, Chinese state media released a video which mentioned several of the assets that would be used in the exercises, including PLA army rockets, the Navy's destroyer escort, a missile boat, the Air Force's J-series, fighter bombers, electronic warfare aircraft, and aerial tankers.

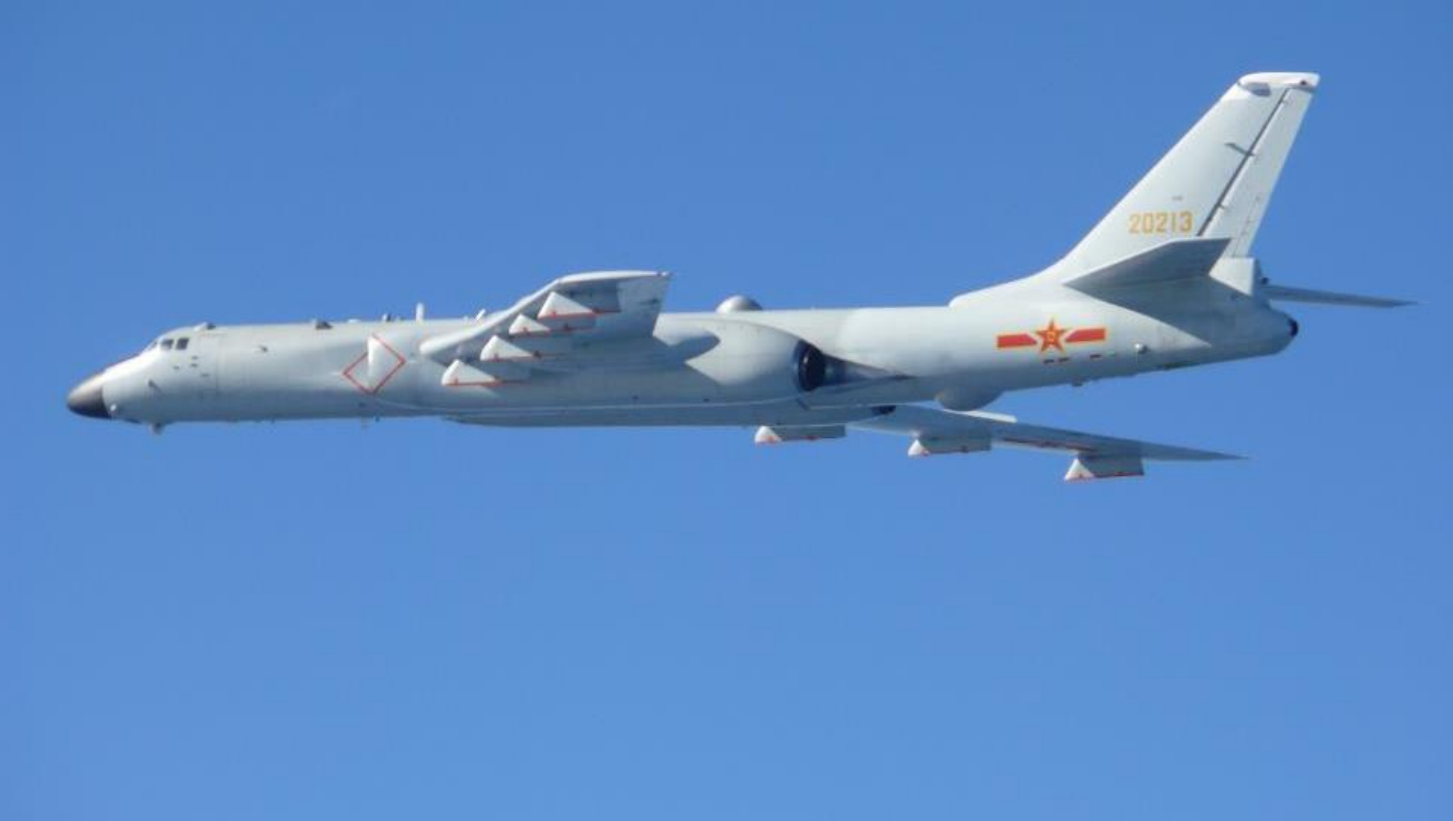
Xian H-6 bombers, one pictured here in 2022, were spotted the exercises

Following the announcement, the military dispatched several warships and dozens of aircraft—including Sukhoi Su-30s and Xian H-6 bombers—toward Taiwan. According to Taiwan's defense ministry, approximately 71 Chinese military aircraft crossed the median line of the Taiwan Strait. The PLA later announced a live-fire exercise on waters near Pingtan Island. Taiwan released a map of the flight paths of four Chinese J-15 fighter jets to the east of the island, which analysts stated were likely from the Shandong aircraft carrier which was participating in the military exercises.

On 9 April 2023, Chinese fighter jets and war ships simulated strikes on Taiwan and simulated an encirclement of the island, prompting Taiwan to deploy its own warships, leading to a standoff between the two navies.

In response, on 10 April, the U.S. Navy sent one warship to the South China Sea. That same day, China announced the end of the initial drills, but stated they would continue combat training around Taiwan.

=== August 2023 ===
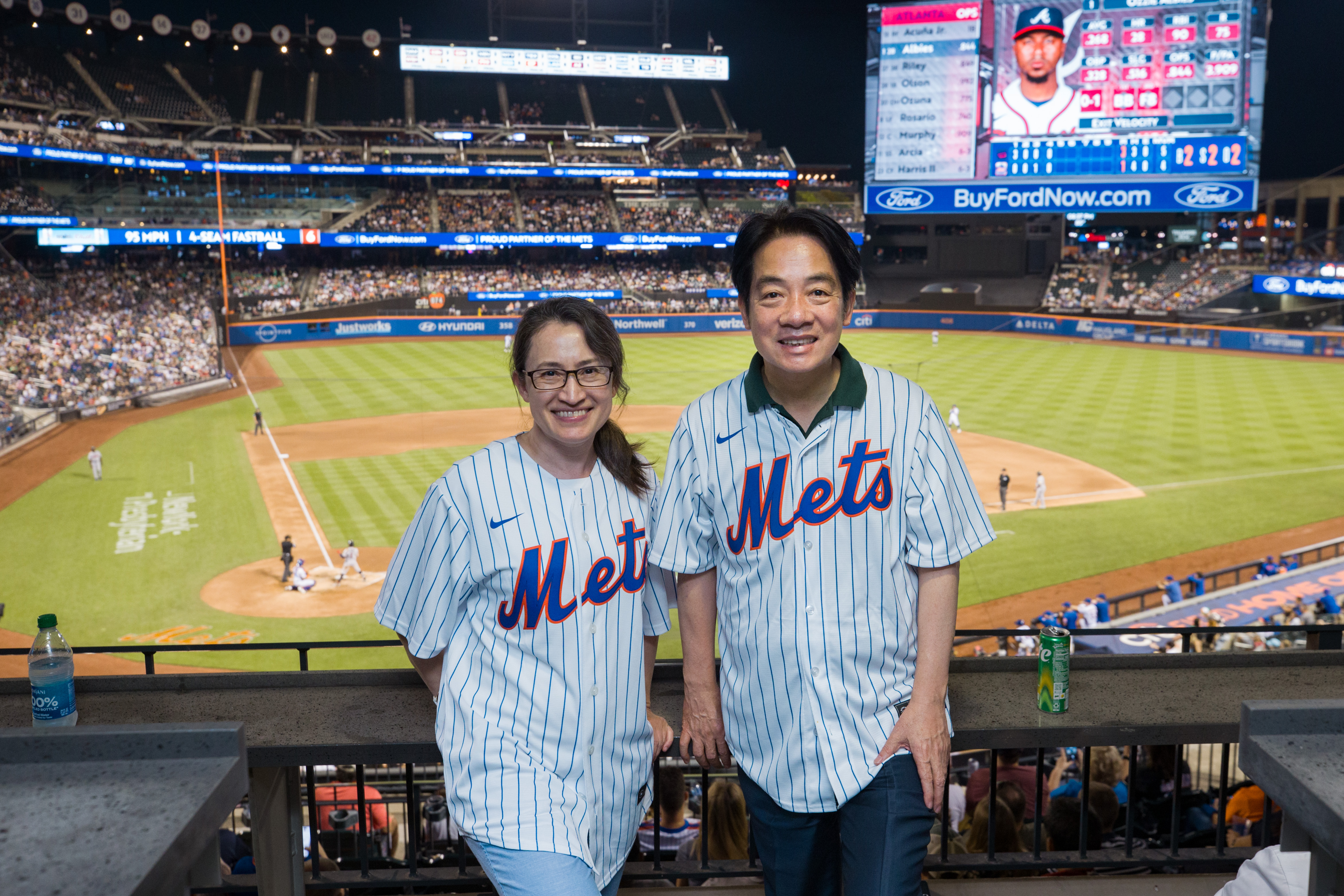
Lai Ching-te and Hsiao Bi-khim in New York City in 2023. The pair was elected President and Vice President the following year.

In mid-August 2023, then-Taiwanese Vice President Lai Ching-te transited through the United States during a diplomatic trip to Paraguay, in South America, making a stopover in New York City. In response, China initiated a day of large-scale military drills around Taiwan on Saturday, 19 August, with at least 42 Chinese aircraft and 8 ships detected in the space around Taiwan, and 26 Chinese fighter jets crossing the Median Line of the Taiwan Strait. The drill was smaller than the previous two Chinese military drills around Taiwan, however. According to the PLA, they carried out "omnidirectional encirclement" of Taiwan. While the PRC has long despised Taiwanese politicians from the Democratic Progressive Party (DPP), they were known to harbor a particular enmity for Lai Ching-te.

=== May 2024 (Joint Sword–2024A) ===
Operational areas involved in Joint Sword-2024A (map data)

On 20 May 2024, Lai Ching-te was inaugurated as President. The Eastern Theater Command of Operations conducted the initial round of military drills from 23 May to 24 May 2024. The People's Liberation Army's Eastern Theater Command initiated joint exercises and training in the Taiwan Strait, the northern, southern, and eastern regions of the island of Taiwan, as well as the areas surrounding Kinmen, Matsu Islands, Wuqiu Island, and Dongyin Island, at 0745 hours on 23 May 2024. After the Joint Operations Command Center of the Eastern Theatre issued operational instructions, the East Sea Fleet's numerous frigate formations maneuvered at high velocities in multiple directions to the waters surrounding the island of Taiwan. The ships initiated combat deployment upon their scheduled arrival at the designated sea area. The Eastern Theater Command Air Force conducted systematic war patrols around Taiwan and the outer islands by deploying dozens of fighter aircraft. The People's Liberation Army Rocket Force provided support and cover for multi-model formations, which were fully loaded with live ammunition, as they flew to predetermined airspace to establish a number of strike positions.

On 23 May, Li Xi, the spokesman for the Eastern Theater Command, stated that the "separatist forces" seeking "uniqueness" are "Taiwan independence" and are receiving strong discipline. He also issued a serious warning to "external forces that are interfering with provocations". Li Xi then disclosed the use of weapons and equipment, including Chengdu J-20, Shenyang J-16, Type 052C destroyer, Type 071 amphibious transport dock, Dongfeng series missiles, and box-type long-range rockets.

=== October 2024 (Joint Sword–2024B) ===
Operational areas involved in Joint Sword-2024B (map data)

Following the Taiwan National Day holidays, on 14 October, the Eastern Theater Command of the People's Liberation Army (PLA) coordinated with the Navy (PLAN), Air Force (PLAAF), Rocket Force (PLARF) and the Chinese Coast Guard to conduct "Joint Sword-2024B" maneuvers in the Taiwan Strait, as well as six marked areas in the waters north, south, and east of Taiwan, effectively surrounding Taiwan during the drills. According to Li Xi, a spokesman for the Eastern Theater Command, the different branches of the Chinese military focused the exercises on sea-air combat-readiness patrols, blockades on key ports and areas, assaults on maritime and ground targets, and the joint seizure of comprehensive superiority. During the operation, the Chinese Coast Guard sent four fleets of ships to conduct "law enforcement inspections" around Taiwan, and carried out "comprehensive law enforcement patrols" in waters surrounding the Dongyin and Matsu Islands. The Chinese military described the exercises as a "stern warning to the separatist acts of Taiwan Independence forces."

=== December 2024 ===
Operational areas involved in the December 2024 drills (map data)

On 30 November 2024, President Lai Ching-te made a stopover in Hawaii, as part of a 2-day transit in the US, during a diplomatic trip to the South Pacific countries. Around the same time, China quietly conducted large-scale military drills off their coastline in the East China Sea, spanning from 28 to 30 November. Lai's trip drew fierce backlash from China, which was expected to launch another large military drill around Taiwan in response, with Taiwanese officials and some media outlets speculating that it could be named "Joint Sword–2024C". On 8 December 2025, China announced that they would be holding large-scale military drills across both the East China Sea and the Taiwan Strait over the next few days, closing roughly 1,000 kilometres (620 mi) of airspace across the region when combined with their earlier drill at the end of November. On 9 December, China deployed over 90 ships across the region, including some positioned near Japan's southern islands, and including moving ships in a formation of two parallel walls to the east of Taiwan, simulating blockade operations. The operation was left unnamed, contrary to expectations. This was China's single-largest maritime deployment to date, exceeding the scale of the previous drills from 2024, their seminal August 2022 military drill, and even their operations during the 1996 Third Taiwan Strait Crisis, and it was also the first time they held a military operation of such scale during the winter, which was unusual for them. This drill was the first that appeared to target the entire First Island Chain in scope, as well as having a focus specifically on defeating potential foreign intervention. China's operation concluded three days later, by 12 December, and the military drill ended without any live fire. According to a Taiwanese official, this particular military operation probably took 70 days to plan, meaning that it was already scheduled prior to President Lai's Hawaii transit, and even before the previous large-scale drills in October (Joint Sword–2024B).

=== April 2025 (Strait Thunder–2025A) ===
==== Prelude ====
On 26 February 2025, shortly before the exercise, the People's Liberation Army Navy conducted an unannounced exercise off the coast of Kaohsiung and Pingtung. The exercise included live-fire drills. At least 32 aircraft and several warships participated in the exercise, of which 22 crossed the Taiwan Strait Median Line. This exercise was not announced in advance, and the code name of the operation was not made public. It was widely regarded as a simulated surprise attack. The Republic of China's navy, army, and air force were placed on alert. The next day, the Premier of the Executive Yuan of the Republic of China, Cho Jung-tai, expressed hope that mainland China would exercise restraint in such actions, and instructed the armed forces to remain vigilant against various developments in the surrounding areas. The Ministry of National Defense of the Republic of China also condemned the PLA's behavior. On the same day, Senior Colonel Wu Qian, Director of the Information Bureau of the Ministry of National Defense and spokesman for the Ministry of National Defense, criticized the US attempt to "use Taiwan to contain China" and the Taiwan Democratic Progressive Party authorities' attempt to "rely on the US to seek independence" and "resist unification by force" at a regular press conference when answering questions about the recent Taiwan military "Han Kuang Exercise" exercise. He said to the Taiwan side, "Trying to stop a chariot with a mantis arm will only lead to its own destruction. Sooner or later, we will come to take you away."

On 13 March, President Lai Ching-te of the Republic of China delivered a speech after a national security meeting held on the eve of the 20th anniversary of the 2005 Anti-Secession Law. In addition to proposing 17 response strategies for the national security and united front threats facing Taiwan, he also called China a "foreign hostile forces" as defined by the Anti-Infiltration Act.

On 1 April, Minister of National Defense of the Republic of China Gu Lixiong stated that since 29 March, the dynamics of the aircraft carrier Shandong formation and other aircraft and ships have been gradually grasped, and yesterday (31 March) they entered the national army's "response zone", indicating that the People's Liberation Army had begun preparing for military operations since the end of March.

==== Military drills ====
On 1 April 2025, Zhu Anqing, spokesperson for the East China Sea Branch of the China Coast Guard, stated that multiple Coast Guard fleets had organized law enforcement patrols in the waters around Taiwan, and conducted exercises on spot inspections, arrests, interception, and detention. The Fujian Coast Guard organized a fleet of ships to conduct comprehensive law enforcement patrols in the waters near Dongyin Island and Wuqiu Island.

On the morning of 1 April, the Eastern Theater Command Media Center released three posters in Traditional Chinese characters, with themes such as "Advance," "Deterrence and Closure," and "Destruction and Paralysis"., as well as an animation titled "Shell," which showed how Lai Ching-te used "peace," "freedom," "democracy," and "prosperity" as a cover to "de-Chiangize" his country, formulate the "17 National Security Regulations" of "green terror" to persecute political opponents (such as Ko Wen-je and Kao An-kuo), and increase military purchases and rely on the United States to seek "independence" to sell out Taiwan. In the animation, Lai Ching-te was drawn up as a worm roasted on fire. This was the first time since Chiang Kai-shek that the Chinese Communist Party had vilified a major Taiwanese leader. On the same day, the Eastern Theater Command released an animation titled "Exorcising Demons and Demons", which used material from the popular 2024 game Black Myth: Wukong. The video showed Taipei 101 and Hankou Street, as well as satellite positioning locked on Taiwan, and simulated missile attacks on Zhongzheng District in Taipei City, where the Presidential Palace of the Republic of China is located. This was the first time that the People's Liberation Army had clearly released its attack target. However, Taiwan media outlet China Times believed that the video had a stronger flavor of "internal propaganda". The exercise video released by the official media showed for the first time the so-called H-6K bomber carrying the Eagle Strike 21 anti-ship missile, which is considered to be able to effectively prevent US military intervention. According to data from the Ministry of National Defense of the Republic of China, on that day, at least 76 PLA military aircraft (37 of which crossed the median line of the Taiwan Strait) and 15 warships and 4 government ships approached Taiwan.

Initially, this military drill went unnamed, with a Chinese military source justifying the decision by stating that this change was indicative of the large-scale military exercises near Taiwan having become routine. On 2 April, the second day of the exercise, the Eastern Theater Command officially announced the code name of this exercise, "Strait Thunder-2025A". However, the scope of the exercises that started on 2 April only included "relevant waters in the central and southern parts of the Taiwan Strait". The training subjects were "verification and identification, warning and expulsion, interception and detention, etc.", which was different from the time, scope and subjects announced on the previous day. It can be seen that "Strait Thunder" was not the code name of the entire exercise, and the exercise on 1 April did not fall under the scope of "Strait Thunder".

On 2 April, the Eastern Theater Command of the People's Liberation Army conducted a long-range live-fire exercise in the relevant waters of the East China Sea in accordance with the exercise plan, striking simulated targets, such as important ports and energy facilities. The Shandong aircraft carrier formation was in the sea and air space east of Taiwan Island, conducting exercises with naval and air force forces on subjects such as ship-aircraft coordination, regional air control, and sea and land strikes. Zhang Chi, a professor at the National Defense University (China) of the People's Liberation Army National Defense University (China), said that the Shandong aircraft carrier formation's participation in the exercise showed that the PLA's ability to respond quickly, strike with precision, and coordinate systems is constantly improving. The presence of the aircraft carrier fleet in the area east of Taiwan helps to militarily block the lifeline of energy resource imports, the support line for obtaining foreign aid, and the escape line for evading sanctions for the "Taiwan independence" forces. Later, the Eastern Theater Command (China) simulated the use of PHL-16 to attack the Yong'an LNG Terminal in Kaohsiung. As a result, the trajectory of the cargo ship Ebisu transporting natural gas to the Taichung LNG Terminal was suspected to be affected by the exercise. The Ministry of Economic Affairs of the Republic of China clarified this. However, it is certain that the Eastern Theater Command has listed the energy facilities of the Republic of China as priority targets for destruction. In addition, the People's Liberation Army (PLA) also conducted long-range live-fire exercises in the East China Sea. The Ministry of National Defense of the Republic of China stated that on that day, at least 59 PLA aircraft (31 of which crossed the Median line of the Taiwan Strait|median line of the strait) and 23 warships approached Taiwan. The images released by the Coast Guard Administration (Taiwan) at a press conference confirmed that the China Coast Guard Ship 2305 entered the 24-nautical-mile zone adjacent to Taiwan Island. Yuyuan Tantian, a social media account affiliated with the China Central Television, said that the closest distance of the drill with Taiwan was less than 20 nautical miles.

On 2 April, the Eastern Theater Command released a poster titled "Lockdown". The official account of the People's Liberation Army News and Communication Center, "Jun Zhengping Studio", published a commentary titled "Taiwan independence means war, don't say I didn't warn you". The China Coast Guard released a themed video titled "Clean Sea" on law enforcement and control around Taiwan Island.

Taiwan current affairs commentator Julian Kuo determined that because the United States was busy launching a tariff war and dealing with the Russian invasion of Ukraine, and CCP General Secretary Xi Jinping will visit Russia on 9 May and attend the Victory Day commemoration activities, there is not enough time to prepare a big event, so this military exercise is more like a compromise. The final move is expected to be on 20 May, one year after Lai Ching-te's inauguration. At that time, Lai Ching-te may make remarks similar to "the two sides of the Taiwan Strait are not subordinate to each other" and "hostile forces abroad", and the People's Liberation Army will once again launch a partial blockade of Taiwan.

On 3 April, the People's Liberation Army Daily published a commentary signed by "Jun Sheng" entitled "Separatist provocations will be severely punished, and the reunification of the motherland will surely be realized", directly calling Lai Ching-te a "trouble maker", "danger maker", and "war maker"; the People's Daily published a commentary signed by "Zhong Yiping" entitled "Resolutely punish Lai Ching-te and do our utmost to defend peace in the Taiwan Strait", stating that "every time the Lai Ching-te administration provokes, military deterrence will be further advanced".

At 6:47 a.m. on 3 April, a U.S. Navy P-8 Poseidon maritime patrol aircraft was warned by a People's Liberation Army Navy warship when it flew over the airspace near the waters off the Hengchun Peninsula in Pingtung County, Taiwan, saying: "You have entered the 24-nautical-mile contiguous zone of China Taiwan (中国台湾), adjust your route and leave." The crew of the P-8 Poseidon responded: "We are conducting a legitimate military operation in international airspace."

=== December 2025 (Justice Mission-2025) ===
Operational areas involved in Justice Mission-2025 (map data)

On 29 December, the People's Liberation Army (PLA)'s Eastern Theater Command deployed units from its ground force, navy, air force and rocket force to areas around Taiwan. Eastern Theater Command spokesperson Shi Yi announced that the drills would take place in the Taiwan Strait and areas to the north, southwest, southeast and east of the island. He said the exercises would focus on combat readiness, blockades of strategic areas, joint operations, and deterring "Taiwan independence separatist forces" and "external interference forces". This military exercise was the 8th major drill held around Taiwan since 2022, as well as the first that had a publicly stated aim of deterring external involvement; it has also been described by some sources as China's most extensive military exercise near Taiwan to date. Separately, the PLA said live-fire exercises were carried out in areas north and southwest of Taiwan, and also initially designated five zones for live-fire drills from 8:00 AM to 6:00 PM local time on 30 December, which the China Maritime Safety Administration later said had increased to seven. Ships and aircraft were warned to stay away from the zones. The zones crossed into Taiwan's territorial waters for the first time since the 2022 exercises that the Chinese military had held around Taiwan.

On one of its Chinese social media accounts, the Eastern Theater Command released a video that was shot by a drone which purported to show a view of Taipei 101. In addition, the China Coast Guard announced the start of patrols in waters near Matsu and Wuqiu. A report by government media China Central Television said the exercises included "maritime and airborne search-and-destroy operations, simulated strikes on land and live-fire naval drills" and focused on blockading the Port of Keelung and Kaohsiung. Commenting on the drills, Chinese foreign ministry spokesperson Lin Jian said attempts by external forces to use Taiwan to contain China would only push the region closer to war. Taiwan Affairs Office spokesperson Chen Binhua said the Taiwanese government was colluding with external forces to seek independence. Ministry of National Defense spokesperson Zhang Xiaogang said the PLA would not hesitate to fight pro-independence forces and organize anti-separatist and anti-interference actions in order to promote reunification and safeguard national sovereignty, unity, and territorial integrity. Chinese state-run tabloid Global Times connected the drills to US weapons sales.

At 3:00 PM Taipei Time, on 29 December, Taiwanese Deputy Chief of the General Staff for Intelligence Hsieh Jih-sheng stated Taiwan had detected 14 PLA warships and 14 Chinese Coast Guard vessels around Taiwan, as well as the detection of an "amphibious assault strike group" consisting of four ships in the southeastern water of Taiwan and 89 warplanes in the skies around Taiwan, with 67 of them entering Taiwan's response zone under Taiwan's monitoring and response. On the second day of the drills, several live rockets were fired from Pingtan Island. The Eastern Theatre Command subsequently said it had fired rockets into waters both north and south of Taiwan and released a video of firing what appeared to be a mobile PCH-191 rocket launcher firing into the sea. This was the first time China fired rockets into the Taiwan Strait since the 2022 exercises, with Taiwan's Ministry of National Defense stating the rockets landed near Taiwan's 24 nautical mile line. The ministry also stated that in the 24-hour period through 6:00 AM Taipei Time on 30 December, it had confirmed activity by 130 Chinese military fighters, drones and other aircraft around Taiwan, as well as 14 Chinese military ships and eight other Chinese ships. Hsieh stated that the PLA had fired 27 rockets into waters to the north and southwest of Taiwan.

=== 2026 ===
On December 25, 2025, prior to the start of the "Justice Mission-2025" operation, more than 2,000 Chinese fishing vessels massed into two parallel lines in the East China Sea, forming a double "reverse L" shape stretching over 466 km (290 mi) long. A similar operation was repeated two weeks later, when over 1,400 Chinese fishing vessels massed into another reverse L formation in the East China Sea from January 8–13, 2026, with the second formation also extending at least 466 km (290 mi). This activity was unprecedented, and analysts believed that China was likely rehearing its ability to swarm US warships and clog up sea lanes during wartime, which could obstruct movement and complicate supply chains for their opponents, in addition to doubling as decoys for missile and torpedo attacks. Mark Douglas, a Starboard Maritime Intelligence analyst, described the operations as being "staggering", and said that his colleagues had never seen a formation with that size and discipline before. During a 2-week period from February 27–March 13, 2026, no Chinese warplanes were spotted near Taiwan, with a brief exception on March 7, marking a break from the pattern of Chinese military activity observed since late 2020. This was found to be striking and deeply puzzling, with some analysts hypothesizing that China may have been doing this to ease tensions ahead of the upcoming Trump–Xi summit in May 2026. However, regular PLA combat patrols resumed near Taiwan on March 14. In April 2026, Kuomingtang chairwoman Cheng Li-wun and Lai Ching-te's opposition leader made a visit to Xi Jinping which marked the first high-level summit in ten years on both sides of the strait.

During a 40-day period on March 27–May 6, China issued a series of airspace closures off their coast, in the Yellow Sea and the East China Sea. Some of the airspace closures overlapped with a portion of the massive December 2024 military drills' closure zones. Analysts found this activity to be unusual due to the sheer length of the operations, in addition to the scale, since Chinese military drills normally don't last longer than a few days at a time. Some analysts believed that this activity could mark a shift in how China uses their airspace to send strategic messages to other countries, while others believed that this could potentially be aimed at deterring Japan and other US allies in the Indo-Pacific. On June 6–10, during a 4-day period, the PLAN carried out their first "law enforcement patrols" in the waters east of Taiwan, with the PRC claiming that this was a response to the Tokyo meeting between Japanese Prime Minister Sanae Takaichi and Philippine President Bongbong Marcos on May 28. This came after the operation was announced by the China Coast Guard (CCG) on June 1, with Chinese vessels moving into position on June 5. This was the heaviest deployment of PRC vessels seen in the waters near Taiwan to date, which saw the deployment of four different large Chinese vessels, and ships coming as close as 32 nautical miles (37 mi; 60 km) to Taiwan's eastern shoreline. During this time, Chinese vessels also began hailing civilian vessels near Taiwan's east coast, asking them to provide information. This raised fears among observers that China could attempt to coerce Taiwan with a naval quarantine operation, which would allow China to attempt to impose control over Taiwan's waters and airspace without resorting to war. Analysts saw this operation as a continuation of China's grey-zone tactics against Taiwan, and a potential rehearsal for quarantine operations, with the Jamestown Foundation calling it a "Quasi-Quarantine".

== Impact ==
Operational areas involved in all the major military drills of the Fourth Taiwan Strait Crisis (map data)

After China began their December 2025 military drills (Justice Mission-2025), Taiwan's Civil Aviation Administration said it expected more than 100,000 travelers to be affected by the drills, with 857 international flights impacted and 84 domestic flights canceled. It added that routes to Kinmen and Matsu were blocked, affecting around 6,000 travelers.

=== Fears of invasion ===
China's initial August 2022 drill disturbed the region, and the military drills triggered fears of a potential invasion of Taiwan in some corners of Western countries, particularly in light of the 2022 Russian invasion of Ukraine, and China's accelerating military buildup. This fear has been heightened by the approaching "Davidson window", the nickname for China's potential window of opportunity when they will finally be able to mount an invasion of Taiwan. This term was coined after Admiral Philip Davidson's made remarks at 2021 Congressional hearing that China could try to achieve "reunification" with Taiwan on an accelerated timetable, by 2027, the year of the PLA's centennial, when they are expected to become a fully-intelligentized force capable of carrying out combined joint operations. General Mark Milley revealed that Davidson's belief stemmed from a speech from CCP General Secretary Xi Jinping, in which he had exhorted the PLA to move up their timetable for developing the capabilities necessary for invading Taiwan from 2035 to 2027.

== Reactions ==
=== Taiwan ===
The ROC Defense Ministry strongly condemned the Joint Sword-2024B Chinese exercises, stating that they were "irrational and provocative", and vowed to deploy "appropriate forces" to respond in order to defend its sovereignty.

China's April 2025 military drills were widely condemned across Taiwan, including by President Lai Ching-te, ROC Mainland Affairs Council Vice Chairman Liang Wenjie, and Kuomintang Chairman Eric Chu.

During the December 2025 drills, Taiwanese president Lai Ching-te said that China's escalation of military pressure was part of an ongoing cognitive warfare campaign and "not something that a responsible power should do". Presidential Office spokesperson Karen Kuo said Taiwan condemned the Chinese government for using its military to intimidate and threaten neighboring countries. The Ministry of National Defense said the exercises undermined regional peace. The Mainland Affairs Council said the exercises disrupted Taiwan's civil aviation and maritime traffic. Democratic Progressive Party (DPP) spokesperson Wu Cheng said the drills undermined the Kuomintang's claims that cross-strait exchanges would ease tensions. In response, Kuomintang chairwoman Cheng Li-wun said the drills were caused by the DPP's cross-strait policies, and accused Lai Ching-te of provoking tensions. Taipei Mayor Chiang Wan-an of the Kuomintang condemned the drills as escalatory. Taiwan People's Party chairman Huang Kuo-chang condemned the drills, saying they would only deepen tensions.

=== China ===
China's military called the military exercises a "stern warning to the separatist acts of Taiwan Independence forces."

In April 2025, Zhu Fenglian, spokesperson for the Taiwan Affairs Office of the Central Committee of the Chinese Communist Party, stated that China's operations conducted by the Eastern Theater Command of the People's Liberation Army around Taiwan Island were a "resolute punishment" for the "provocations" of Lai Ching-te's administration in seeking "Taiwan independence", a solemn warning to the "Taiwan independence" separatist forces. He also framed the operations as a "necessary measure" to safeguard the national sovereignty and territorial integrity of China.

=== Japan ===
Japanese defense minister Nobuo Kishi condemned the Chinese military's action, saying that some missiles fired by China in their August 2022 exercise landed in Japan's EEZ, and called the incident "a grave issue that concerns our country’s national security and the safety of the people". Japanese Foreign Minister Yoshimasa Hayashi called for the military exercises to stop, stating that they had a "serious impact on the peace and stability of the region and the international community". In response, Chinese foreign ministry spokesperson Hua Chunying said during a press conference that the relevant waters between China (including Taiwan) and Japan have not been demarcated yet.

On 1 April 2025, Japan's Chief Cabinet Secretary Yoshimasa Hayashi stated that the Japanese government was highly concerned about the People's Liberation Army's recent military exercises and was actively collecting and analyzing intelligence. Japan had also conveyed its concerns to China.

In December 2025, the Japanese government conveyed its concerns to China over the military exercises, saying that it expected issues around Taiwan to be resolved peacefully through dialogue.

=== Philippines ===
On 1 April 2025, Chief of Staff of the Armed Forces of the Philippines General Romeo S. Brawner Jr. warned the Armed Forces of the Philippines to prepare for the possibility of a mainland Chinese attack on Taiwan. He stated that the Philippines would be "at the forefront of rescue operations" in such a scenario. General Brawner emphasized that if a conflict breaks out in the Taiwan Strait, Manila would inevitably be drawn into the situation, and preparations must be made to evacuate the approximately 250,000 Filipino workers currently residing and working in Taiwan.

=== North Korea ===
State news agency KCNA reported that a DPRK foreign ministry spokesman supported the PRC's "righteous stand" and that North Koreans "denounce any external force's intervention in Taiwan".

=== Russia ===
Russian spokesman Dmitry Peskov declared that China has the sovereign right to launch military drills around Taiwan and that Nancy Pelosi's visit provoked the tensions. In April 2023, Peskov stated in an audio post to Telegram that China had the "right to respond" against the "provocative actions" against it.

=== United States ===
On 5 August 2022, US Secretary of State Antony Blinken visited the Philippines and said that the US would seek to de-escalate tensions in the Taiwan Strait in order to keep the region safe and the international waterway open. Antony Blinken called China's actions a significant escalation, and brought up how China had been attempting to change "the status quo on Taiwan for quite some time". He called the military response "extreme, disproportionate, and escalatory".

Together with Australia and Japan, the US signed a joint statement on 6 August that condemned the firing of missiles into Japanese exclusive economic zones and accused China of "raising tension and destabilizing the region."

In the wake of the October 2024 military drills, the United States expressed that it was "seriously concerned" by the exercises, with the State Department stating that "The PRC response with military provocations to a routine annual speech is unwarranted and risks escalation," additionally urging China to "act with restraint" and avoid any further actions which may "undermine peace and stability" in the region.

Following the April 2025 military drills, White House Press Secretary Karoline Leavitt responded at a White House press briefing that the United States reaffirms its opposition to any unilateral attempt to change the status quo in the Taiwan Strait by force or coercion. Donald Trump, the President of the United States, emphasized the importance of maintaining peace across the Taiwan Strait.

When asked about the December 2025 exercises, the United States President Donald Trump said "I have a great relationship with President Xi [Jinping]. And he hasn't told me anything about it. I certainly have seen it" and stated "I don't believe he's going to be doing it" in an apparent reference to a possible invasion. He also dismissed concerns about the exercises by saying "They've been doing naval exercises for 20 years in that area. Now people take it a little bit differently".

=== Other countries ===
List of reactions from governments around the world
- Australia The Australian Department of Foreign Affairs and Trade issued a statement expressing deep concern over China's military and coast guard exercises near Taiwan.
- Belarus: Following the December 2025 drills, the Ministry of Foreign Affairs stated "We support all efforts by the Chinese government to achieve national reunification, protect sovereignty, and territorial integrity".
- Canada: In April 2025, Global Affairs Canada issued a statement on the social media platforms X and Facebook, expressing deep concern over China's recent military exercises near Taiwan. The statement noted that these provocative actions have escalated tensions, undermined regional stability, and impacted global security and prosperity. Canada called on China to resolve cross-strait differences through peaceful means, emphasizing the importance of dialogue over confrontation.
- Germany: In April 2025, the German Federal Foreign Office issued a statement on the social media platform X, expressing concern over the rising tensions caused by China's military exercises around Taiwan. The statement emphasized that the stability of the Taiwan Strait is crucial for both regional and global security, and it also affects Europe's prosperity. It reiterated that the Status quo can only be changed through peaceful means and mutual agreement, not by force or coercion.
- South Korea: Ministry of Foreign Affairs spokesperson Park Il said South Korea hoped "cross-strait relations will develop peacefully through dialogue and cooperation".
- Sweden: In April 2025, Swedish Minister for Defence Pål Jonson responded in writing to a parliamentary inquiry, stating that China's actions toward Taiwan are concerning and that military threats are unacceptable. He emphasized that differences across the Taiwan Strait must be resolved peacefully and with respect for the will of the people of Taiwan. Jonson further stated that it is in Sweden's interest to help prevent states with military power from undermining the rules-based international order and violating international norms and regulations.
- UK: In April 2025, a spokesperson for the Foreign, Commonwealth and Development Office (FCDO) of the United Kingdom issued a statement expressing concern over China's military exercises near Taiwan. The statement described the exercises as part of a broader pattern of activity that is escalating tensions and poses a risk of dangerous escalation in the Taiwan Strait.

=== Supranational bodies ===
- G7+European Union: Following the April 2023, drill, the European Union (EU) expressed concern about the "intensification" of military activity around Taiwan, stating that the status quo should not be changed unilaterally, or by force, and urged restraint. Following the Strait Thunder–2025A drill, the foreign ministers of the Group of Seven (G7) and Vice President of the European Commission and High Representative of the European Union for Foreign Affairs and Security Policy Kaja Kallas issued a joint statement, saying that "we, the G7 foreign ministers of Canada, France, Germany, Italy, Japan, the United Kingdom, and the United States, as well as the EU High Representative, express deep concern about China's provocative activities, especially the recent large-scale military exercises around Taiwan. These increasingly frequent and unstable activities have increased tensions across the Taiwan Strait and endangered the security and prosperity of the world. G7 members and the broader International community are concerned about maintaining peace and stability in the Taiwan Strait. We oppose any unilateral actions that threaten to undermine peace and stability, including resorting to force or coercion. G7 members continue to encourage the two sides of the Taiwan Strait to resolve issues peacefully through constructive dialogue".

== Analysis ==
Analyst Rebecca Wilkins argued China escalated its posture after Pelosi's visit, which expanded its military presence in the area, using the visit as justification to establish a new status quo in the Taiwan Strait. A second incident occurred in April 2023, following a meeting with US Speaker of the House Kevin McCarthy; eventually, China continued carrying out further large-scale military drills, often using actions perceived as hostile from Taiwan, the US, or other countries as excuses for doing so. The ChinaPower Project at the Center for Strategic and International Studies polled 64 leading U.S. experts on the People's Republic of China (PRC), Taiwan, and cross-strait relations, including 28 former high-level U.S. government (USG) officials from both Democrat and Republican administrations, as well as 23 former USG policy and intelligence analysts and 13 top experts from academia and think tanks. Responses were collected from 10 August – 8 September 2022. The CSIS summarized the responses of the experts as follows:

1. China is determined to unify with Taiwan, but Beijing does not have a coherent strategy.
2. China is willing to wait to unify with Taiwan, and the August 2022 exercises are not an indicator of accelerated PRC timelines.
3. Xi Jinping feels there are still avenues to peaceful unification.
4. The potential for a military crisis or conflict in the Taiwan Strait is very real.
5. China would immediately invade if Taiwan declared independence.
6. China assumes that the United States would intervene in a Taiwan conflict.

Analysts have linked the escalation of the military drills during this crisis to China's broader rise as a great power. As China's global influence grew over the 2020s, Beijing became increasingly willing to assert its interests in what it considers its core interests, with Taiwan being the absolute foremost of those. Additionally, Russia's war in Ukraine and the revival of other territorial disputes in recent years have had an emboldening effect on Beijing. The drills are widely interpreted as part of a long-term effort by China to normalize sustain PLA operations around Taiwan, while improving the credibility of coercive options short of a kinetic war. Additionally, increasing attention has been drawn to 2027, a year frequently cited by defense analysts as a milestone by which the PLA is expected to have developed the full spectrum of capabilities needed for a potential blockade or invasion of Taiwan; US intelligence has also noted that Xi Jinping ordered the PLA to prepare for potentially taking Taiwan by 2027.

The geopolitical impact of a successful invasion of Taiwan would be profound. US naval historian Andrew K. Blackley noted that China retaking Taiwan would not pose an existential threat to the security of the United States; however, it would hurt its prestige. Conversely, China's failure to reunify Taiwan would be a significant threat to the legitimacy of the Chinese Communist Party.

== See also ==
- First Taiwan Strait Crisis
- Second Taiwan Strait Crisis
- Third Taiwan Strait Crisis
- Island chain strategy
- Hainan Island incident
- 2023 Chinese balloon incident
- 2025 Chinese naval exercises in the Tasman Sea
- 2025–2026 China–Japan diplomatic crisis
- 1960 U-2 incident
- Cuban Missile Crisis
- Cold War II
- Century of Humiliation
- China–Japan relations
- China–United States relations
- Prelude to the 2022 Russian invasion of Ukraine
