= 2025 Chinese military exercises around Taiwan =

2025 Chinese military exercises around Taiwan may refer to:

- Strait Thunder–2025A
- Justice Mission 2025
