= 2022 Chinese military exercises around Taiwan =

- Part of the Fourth Taiwan Strait Crisis
- Operational areas involved in the August 2022 military drills (map data)
- Location: Northwest Pacific Ocean: Taiwan Strait; East China Sea; Philippine Sea; Luzon Strait; South China Sea
- Planned by: China
- Commanded by: Xi Jinping; Xu Qiliang; Zhang Youxia; Wei Fenghe
- Objective: Retaliate against United States House speaker Nancy Pelosi's visit to Taiwan; Test capabilities of joint blockade, sea assault, land attack and air combat drills
- Date: 4–15 August 2022 (1 week and 4 days)
- Executed by: People's Liberation Army; Eastern Theater Command
- Outcome: Start of the Fourth Taiwan Strait Crisis

The 2022 Chinese military exercises around Taiwan (traditional Chinese: 2022年環臺軍事演練; simplified Chinese: 2022年环台军事演练) were a series of large-scale live-fire military exercises that lasted from 4–11 August 2022 by the People's Republic of China (PRC) that encircled the island Taiwan, ruled independently by the government of the Republic of China (ROC). The military exercises involved naval deployments, air sorties and ballistic missile launches by the People's Liberation Army (PLA). The exercises started in response to then-United States Speaker of the House Nancy Pelosi's visit to Taiwan.

The military exercises were the first batch of an ongoing series of large-scale, multi-zonal show of force by China against Taiwan and some of its key foreign backers over the next few years, collectively coined as the Fourth Taiwan Strait Crisis. These exercises, which drew criticism from the G7 nations, were intended to deter what the PRC perceives as US involvement in "internal Chinese affairs" and to demonstrate Chinese military power in the region to both international and domestic audiences. The scale and ferocity of these live-fire drills were unprecedented in recent history and took place in seven zones that surrounded the island's busiest international waterways and aviation routes, demonstrating their capacity to completely blockade the island.

On 8 August, China's military announced new military exercises around Taiwan. China announced an end to the exercises on 10 August, but also stated that regular "patrols" would be launched in the Taiwan Strait.

== Background ==
=== Incursions into Taiwan ADIZ ===
Since 2020, Taiwan's Ministry of National Defense has published routine reports on incursions of its Air Defense Identification Zone by Chinese forces, which are considered by analysts as part of a salami-slicing/swarming strategy and show of force in the region. PLA aircraft entered on nearly 250 days in the 12 months between September 2020 and 2021, and the PRC's 2021 National Day celebrations saw a record number of 148 aircraft inside Taiwan's ADIZ over the course of four days. Most of these incursions, some of which included nuclear-capable bombers, took place in the southwestern part of the ADIZ following major events related to Taiwan's international space. In a biennial report released in November 2021, the ROC Ministry of Defense warned that the PRC had obtained the capacity to surround and blockade the island's harbours, airports, and outbound flight routes.

=== Escalation of tensions ===
On 9 January 2021, the US State Department under Mike Pompeo announced that it was Lifting Self-Imposed Restrictions on the U.S.-Taiwan Relationship, drawing protest from the PRC.

On 10 June 2022, PRC Defense Minister Wei Fenghe warned that "if anyone dares to split Taiwan from China, the Chinese army will definitely not hesitate to start a war", adding that it "would have no choice but to fight ... and crush any attempt of Taiwan independence" to safeguard "national sovereignty and territorial integrity." U.S. Secretary of Defense Lloyd Austin responded by condemning China's "provocative, destabilising" military activity near Taiwan.

The week before Nancy Pelosi's visit, General Secretary of the Chinese Communist Party Xi Jinping warned U.S. President Joe Biden in a phone call that Washington should abide by the One China principle and that "those who play with fire will perish by it". Biden told reporters that U.S. military officials believed Pelosi's visit was "not a good idea right now".

== Military exercises ==
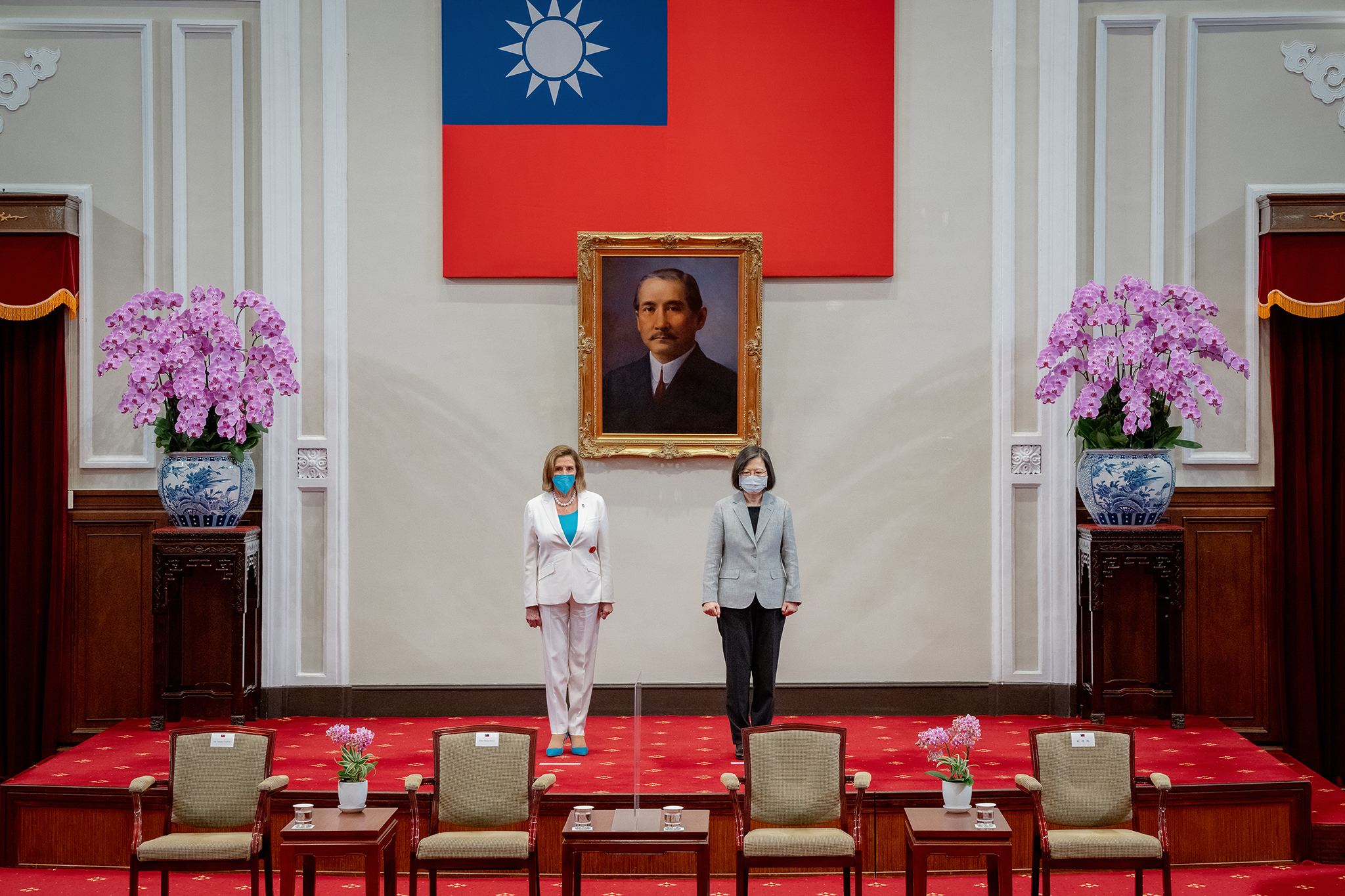
ROC president Tsai Ing-wen hosting US Speaker Nancy Pelosi and her entourage.

Tsai Ing-wen delivers remarks on the live-fire military exercises China conducting in areas around Taiwan.

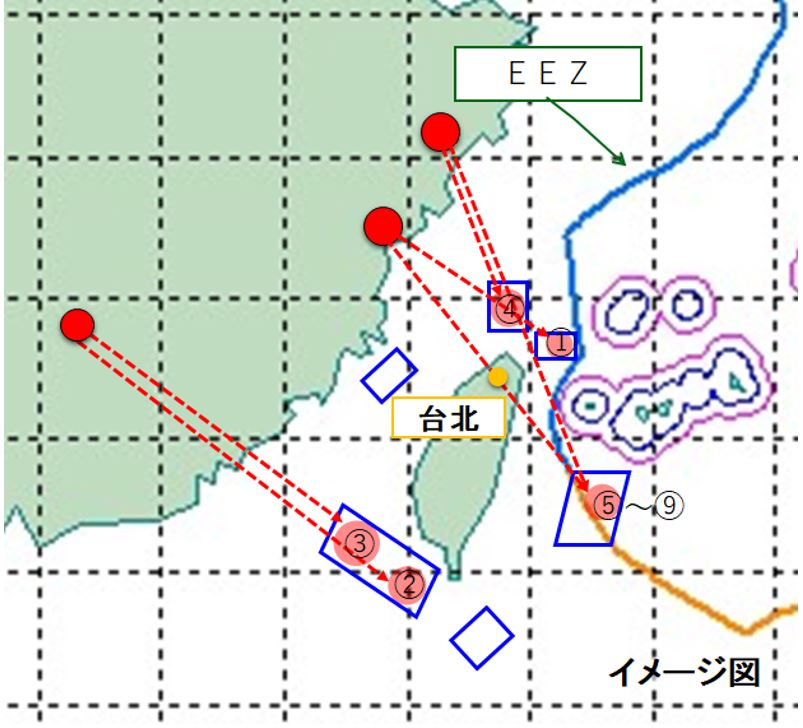
Estimated trajectory of the Chinese ballistic missile launches (source: Japanese Ministry of Defense, published on August 4, 2022).

On 2 August, in response to Pelosi's visit, the People's Republic of China announced four days of military live-fire drills, in six zones that encircled the island on the busiest international waterways and aviation routes. That same day, China began conducting significant military movements around Taiwan. Two days later, on 4 August, China added a seventh zone for their military drill, and they launched a week of full-scale military drills around Taiwan. In response to the announcement, ROC officials complained that the PLA's live-fire drills were an invasion of Taiwan's territorial space and a direct challenge to free air and sea navigation. On 4 August, Taiwanese troops fired flares to drive away drones that flew above the Kinmen Islands. In a show of strength, the PRC deployed both a carrier group, as well as at least one nuclear submarine to the Taiwan Strait, with both the carrier group as well as the nuclear submarine participating in the live-fire drills. The PRC announced additional live-fire drills in both the Yellow and Bohai sea, and China's Maritime Safety Administration announced five restricted areas in the Yellow Sea where exercises were to happen from 5 August to 15 August, as well as four additional zones in the Bohai Sea where a month of PRC military operations were to happen starting from 8 August.

China fired 11 missiles into waters surrounding Taiwan during the live fire drills, at least several of which were Dongfeng ballistic missiles, double the number fired in July 1995, during the Third Taiwan Strait Crisis. Several missiles reportedly flew over Taiwan. Japan reported that five of the missiles landed in its exclusive economic zone, southwest of the Yaeyama Islands. According to the Japanese Ministry of Defense, this is the first time ballistic missiles launched by China had landed in Japan's exclusive economic zone.

While the PLA live-fire exercises were ongoing on 4 August, the US carrier strike group of the USS Ronald Reagan was conducting military operations in the Philippine Sea, including waters to the southeast of Taiwan. However, the US also cancelled the planned test launch of a Minuteman III missile, which was scheduled to happen during the same week the crisis started, in order to avoid escalating tensions with China further.

In response to the PRC drills, on 7 August, the ROC government announced that it would be conducting live-fire artillery exercises in Pingtung County which served to act as both retaliation to the recent PRC live-fire exercises around Taiwan and test combat readiness. At first, the PRC seemed to wrap up its military drills according to its schedule published on 4 August. During drills held in Lienchiang County flares fired by Taiwan's army started a fire. On Monday, China's Eastern Theater Command announced it would continue its drills, which includes anti-submarine attacks and sea raid operations, without announcing an ending date. On 10 August, Eastern Theatre Command announced an end to the military exercises after it had "successfully completed various tasks and effectively tested the integrated combat capabilities of the troops". However, Eastern Theatre Command also announced it would carry out regular "patrols in the direction of the Taiwan Strait."

== Reactions ==
=== Japan ===
Japanese defense minister Nobuo Kishi condemned the Chinese military's action, saying that some missiles fired by China landed in Japan's EEZ and calling the incident "a grave issue that concerns our country’s national security and the safety of the people". Japanese foreign minister Yoshimasa Hayashi called for the military exercises to stop, stating that they had a "serious impact on the peace and stability of the region and the international community". Chinese foreign ministry spokesperson Hua Chunying said during a press conference that the relevant waters between China (including Taiwan) and Japan have not been demarcated yet.

=== North Korea ===
State news agency KCNA reported that a DPRK foreign ministry spokesman supported the PRC's "righteous stand" and that North Koreans "denounce any external force's intervention in Taiwan".

=== Russia ===
Russian spokesman Dmitry Peskov declared that China has the sovereign right to launch military drills around Taiwan and that Nancy Pelosi's visit provoked the tensions.

=== United States ===
On 5 August 2022, US Secretary of State Antony Blinken visited the Philippines and said that the US would seek to de-escalate tensions in the Taiwan Strait in order to keep the region safe and the international waterway open. He said:

These provocative actions are a significant escalation. We’ve seen how Beijing has attempted to change the status quo on Taiwan for some time – for example, more than doubling the number of aircraft flown over the centerline that separates China and Taiwan over the past two years; pursuing economic coercion, political interference, cyber-attacks against Taiwan. Now they’ve taken dangerous acts to a new level.

...

The fact is the Speaker's visit was peaceful. There is no justification for this extreme, disproportionate, and escalatory military response. Let me say again that nothing has changed about our “one China” policy, which is guided by the Taiwan Relations Act, the three Communiques, and the Six Assurances. We don’t want unilateral changes to the status quo from either side. We do not support Taiwan independence. We expect cross-strait differences to be resolved peacefully, not coercively or by force.

Together with Australia and Japan, the US signed a joint statement on 6 August that condemned the firing of missiles into Japanese exclusive economic zones and accused China of "raising tension and destabilizing the region."

Following the Pelosi visit, the ChinaPower Project at the Center for Strategic and International Studies polled 64 leading U.S. experts on the People's Republic of China (PRC), Taiwan, and cross-Strait relations, including 28 former high-level U.S. government (USG) officials from both Democrat and Republican administrations, as well as 23 former USG policy and intelligence analysts and 13 top experts from academia and think tanks. Responses were collected from 10 August – 8 September 2022. The CSIS summarized the responses of the experts as follows:

1. China is determined to unify with Taiwan, but Beijing does not have a coherent strategy.
2. China is willing to wait to unify with Taiwan, and the August 2022 exercises are not an indicator of accelerated PRC timelines.
3. Xi Jinping feels there are still avenues to peaceful unification.
4. The potential for a military crisis or conflict in the Taiwan Strait is very real.
5. China would immediately invade if Taiwan declared independence.
6. China assumes that the United States would intervene in a Taiwan conflict.

== Aftermath ==
Analyst Rebecca Wilkins argued China escalated its posture after Pelosi's visit, which expanded its military presence in the area, using the visit as justification to establish a new status quo in the Taiwan Strait. A second incident would occur in 2023 following a meeting with US Speaker of the House Kevin McCarthy.

== See also ==
- pre-2022 military exercises, which included brief armed clashes
  - First Taiwan Strait Crisis
  - Second Taiwan Strait Crisis
  - Third Taiwan Strait Crisis
- post-2022 military exercises
  - 2023 Chinese military exercises around Taiwan
  - Joint Sword-2024A
  - Joint Sword-2024B
  - Strait Thunder–2025A
  - Justice Mission 2025
- 2025 Chinese naval exercises in the Tasman Sea
