= M503 =

Flight route off southeast China

M503 is a flight route for civil aviation located off the southeast coast of China. It joins with three extension routes, W121, W122, and W123, which connect M503 with Chinese coastal cities. The route is a point of contention between China and Taiwan, as it passes very close to the median line of the Taiwan Strait. This brings planes on the route very close to Taiwanese-controlled airspace.

Originally proposed in 2015 by the Civil Aviation Administration of China (CAA) to reduce congestion along existing flight routes, M503 was shifted further from the median line and opened only to southbound flights following negotiations between China and Taiwan. In 2018, China began to allow northbound flights without agreement from Taiwan. In 2024, M503 was shifted back to its original route, at one point just 4.2 nautical miles (7.8 km; 4.8 mi) from the median line.

== Route ==
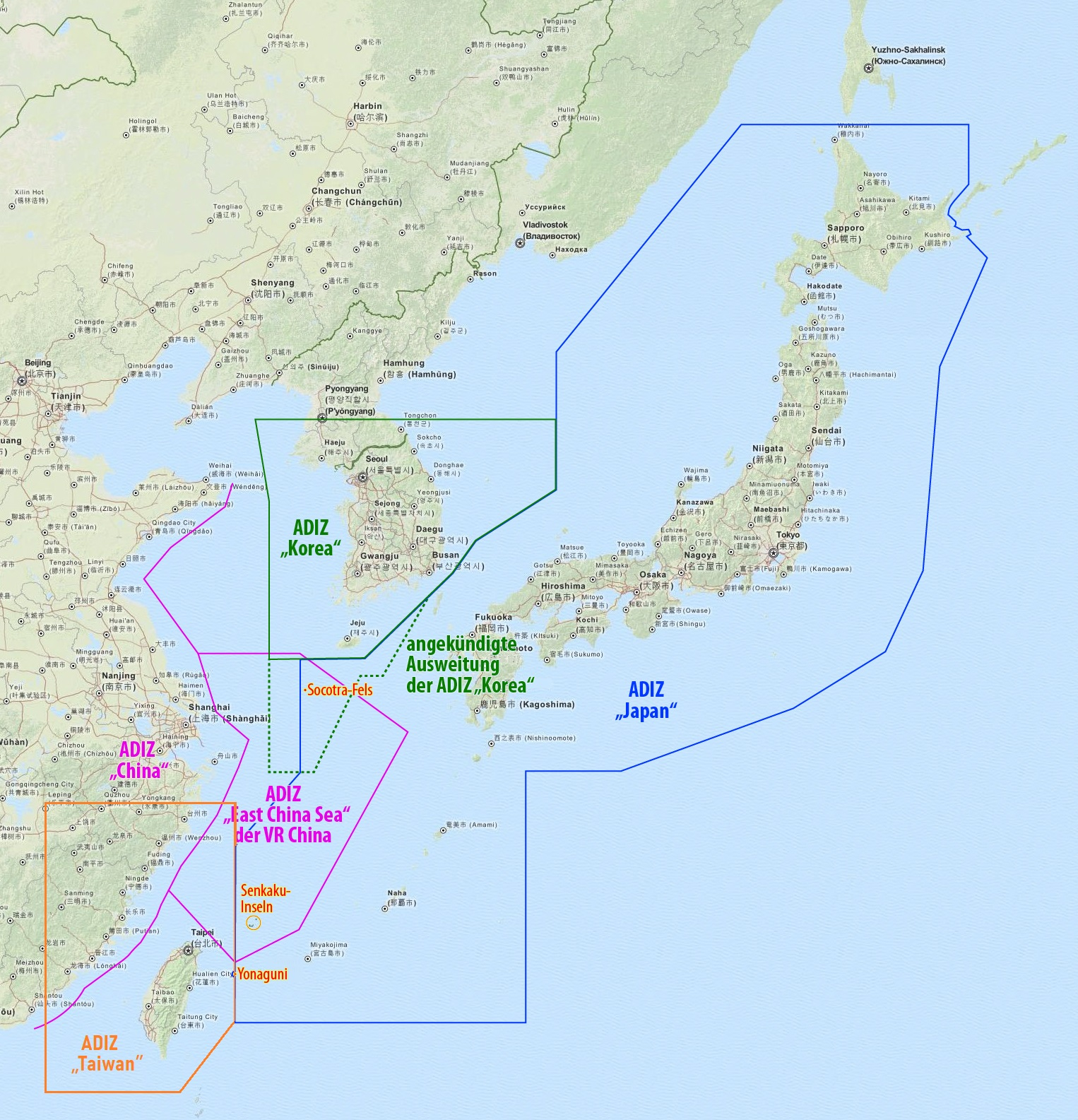
M503 passes through the overlapping air defense identification zones of China and Taiwan

M503 is a broadly north–south flight path that curves over the ocean to the southeast of China. This airspace is under the control of the Shanghai flight information region (FIR) and connects large cities such as Nanjing and Shanghai to the north with Guangzhou and Hong Kong to the south. Part of the route passes through the Taiwan Strait, which separates Taiwan from Mainland China. At one point, M503 passes just 4.2 nautical miles (7.8 km; 4.8 mi) west of the median line dividing the strait in half. The median line serves as the border of the Shanghai FIR and the Taipei FIR. M503 is mainly flown by Chinese airlines, although it is also used by a few foreign flights.

This route means that M503 passes through contentious airspace. The route passes through the overlapping air defense identification zones of China and Taiwan and lies very close to four areas of restricted airspace on the Taiwanese side of the median line patrolled by the Republic of China Air Force. M503 also intersects pre-existing east–west flight paths connecting mainland Taiwan to Kinmen and the Matsu Islands. Alongside the main route, there are three extension routes directly connecting M503 to some coastal cities: W121 connecting to Dongshan, W122 connecting to Fuzhou, and W123 connecting to Xiamen. W122 lies close to the W2 and W8 Matsu-Taipei flight routes, and W123 is at one point just 1.1 nautical miles (2.0 km; 1.3 mi) away from the W6 Kinmen-Penghu-Kaohsiung flight route. This puts these extension paths very close to the airspace Taiwan controls around Kinmen and Matsu, in which Taiwan bars Chinese flights.

== History ==
The M503 flight route was created on 12 January 2015. The Civil Aviation Administration of China (CAA) stated it was created to reduce congestion. The volume of flights in that area was increasing by 10% annually, and one route, A470, already served 1,200 flights each day. The new route would be able to take some of that traffic, as well as allow the opening of the three new extension routes.

The route's path over the Taiwan Strait and proximity to Taiwanese airspace led to immediate protests from Taiwan. Following negotiations, it was agreed that the route would only allow southbound traffic and that the three extension routes would be subject to further negotiations. The route was effectively shifted 6 nautical miles (11 km; 6.9 mi) west, further from the median line. In the years following, around 60 or 70 flights used the route to fly south each day. Flights were initially planned by China to use the flight route from 5 March, but this was delayed to 29 March due to the negotiations. The first day of operations saw 33 flights fly south 10.2 nautical miles (18.9 km; 11.7 mi) from the median line. In the years following, around 60 or 70 flights used the route to fly south each day.

These initial negotiations happened while Taiwanese President Ma Ying-jeou was in power. Ma openly adhered to the One China policy and had good relations with Chinese leadership. The election of Taiwanese President Tsai Ing-wen in 2016 worsened relations, and official communications ended. Taiwan under Ma was invited by China to participate in the 2013 International Civil Aviation Organization assembly as a guest, but was not invited to the 2016 assembly following the election of Tsai.

On 4 January 2018, the CAA announced that M503 would be opened to northbound traffic. It also announced three new extension routes would come into use. This was also attributed to growing congestion and delays in nearby airspace. The W121, W122, and W123 flights were only opened in a westbound (towards China) direction. Taiwan only became aware of the changes at 8am that day, when their air traffic control officers in Kinmen and the Matsu Islands were contacted. This was two hours before the 10am public announcement.

Taiwan protested the changes, canceling 176 Lunar New Year flights between Taiwan and China operated by Chinese airlines in response. Taiwan also notified the airlines using the route of the dispute, leading to international airlines ceasing operations on the route, although the Chinese China Eastern Airlines and XiamenAir continued to use M503. Despite Taiwan's protests, the changes went ahead. As Taiwan is not a member of ICAO, it was unable to lodge a formal complaint regarding its concerns over interference with flights between the island of Taiwan and Kinmen and Matsu. The changes to the route were seen as a way to pressure Taiwan, shifting the status quo in the Taiwan Strait.

On 30 January 2024, the CAA announced that from 1 February, flights on M503 would no longer be shifted through what it called the "offset measure", meaning the route effectively moved east to the original route just 7 kilometres (4.3 mi) from the median line. It was also announced that flights would start flying east along W122 and W123. These changes were also made without discussion with Taiwan, and shortly followed the election of Taiwanese President Lai Ching-te. The start of the eastward flights was announced on 18 April, and began on 19 April. It was also announced that changes would be made on 16 May to the operation of W122 near the Fuzhou Changle International Airport, four days before the scheduled inauguration of Lai.
