= Taiwan Strait Crises =

The Taiwan Strait Crises refers to conflicts involving the Republic of China and the People's Republic of China, following the end of the Chinese Civil War.

- The First Taiwan Strait Crisis (1954–1955), caused by the People's Liberation Army (PLA) shelling of Kinmen and later also the Matsu and Dachen Islands
- The Second Taiwan Strait Crisis (1958), caused by another large-scale PLA shelling of Kinmen and Matsu
- The Third Taiwan Strait Crisis (1995–1996), in the lead-up to Lee Teng-hui's re-election in the 1996 Taiwanese presidential election
- The Fourth Taiwan Strait Crisis (2022–present), a series of large-scale encroaching Chinese military drills around Taiwan, the first of which was triggered by speaker of the United States House of Representatives Nancy Pelosi's visit to Taiwan
