= Tatan Power Plant =

Power plant in Guanyin, Taoyuan City, Taiwan

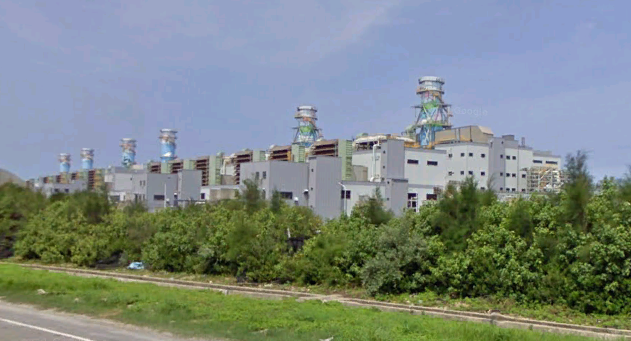
- Official name: 大潭發電廠
- Country: Taiwan
- Location: Guanyin, Taoyuan, Taiwan
- Coordinates: 25°1′34″N 121°2′50″E
- Status: Operational
- Commission date: 2005; January 2009 (Unit 6)
- Owner: Taipower
- Operator: Taipower

Thermal power station
- Primary fuel: Natural gas

Power generation
- Units operational: 7
- Nameplate capacity: 4,986 MW

External links
- Commons: Related media on Commons

The Tatan Power Plant, Dah-Tarn Power Plant or Ta-Tan Power Plant (traditional Chinese: 大潭發電廠; simplified Chinese: 大潭发电厂; pinyin: Dàtán Fādiànchǎng) is a gas-fired power plant in Guanyin District, Taoyuan City, Taiwan. At the capacity of 4,384 MW, the plant is the world's largest gas turbine combined cycle power plant and Taiwan's largest gas-fired power plant.

== Details ==
- Units 1 & 2, 742.7 MW ea, have a total of six Mitsubishi M501F combustion turbines (3 per unit) with two Mitsubishi 282 MW steam turbines. The combustion turbines were upgraded with low-NOx FMk8 model combustors and improved turbine blades in 2018.
- Units 3-6, 724.7 MW ea, have a total of eight Mitsubishi M501G combustion turbines (2 per unit).
- Unit 7 has two General Electric simple cycle 300 MW combustion turbines. The project was awarded in 2016. It is being converted to combined cycle, which will add 300 MW capacity to the unit upon completion in 2024.
- Units 8 & 9 have four General Electric 7HA.02 combustion turbines (two per unit). The project was awarded in 2019 with commissioning scheduled for 2022 (Unit 8) and 2023 (Unit 9).

When complete, the expansions currently underway will bring Tatan to a total capacity of 7,546 MW.

== Architecture ==
The power plant spans over an area of 116.02 hectares with a length of 2,300 meters and width 750 meters.

== Fuel supply ==
The plant operates with liquefied natural gas supplied by CPC Corporation from Taichung LNG Terminal.

== Events ==
=== 2005 ===
On 16 December 2005, the power plant combined cycle Unit 1 and 2 with a capacity of 435.9 MW each went into commercial operation.

=== 2009 ===
On 31 December 2009, the power plant combined cycle Unit 4 and 5 were converted from low pressure to high pressure and started commercial operation on the day. This conversion increased the plant capacity by 507.4 MW.

=== 2012 ===
In 2012, the power plant carried out the Guidance Plan for Energy Industry Adaptive Action in Response to Climate Change to conduct an analysis on the impact of climate change, a vulnerability check and risk evaluation for the facilities within their domain.

=== 2017 ===
On 15 August 2017 at 4:52 p.m., the six generators of the power plant fully tripped due to operation technical error, disrupting the supply of 4 GW of electricity. During the power supply equipment replacement for a control system of the plant's metering station, the worker did not switch the system from auto mode to manual mode before starting the work, resulting the two gas supply pipe valves closed and stop the supply of liquefied natural gas fuel source for two minutes. Electricity rationing was implemented at 6:00 p.m. and ended at 9:40 p.m. The outage hit northern half of Taiwan Island, affecting 6.68 million households. Taipower responded by offering one day electricity charge cut from each household bill, which resulted in NT$270 million of revenue loss to the company.

Economic Affairs Minister Lee Chih-kung resigned shortly afterwards to take responsibility. Premier Lin Chuan appointed Deputy Minister Shen Jong-chin as acting Minister to replace Lee.

== See also ==
- List of power stations in Taiwan
- List of natural gas power stations
- Electricity sector in Taiwan
