= Justice Mission-2025 =

Chinese military exercise near Taiwan

- Part of the Fourth Taiwan Strait Crisis
- Locations of the operational zones utilized by the PLA for Justice Mission-2025
- Location: Northwest Pacific Ocean: Taiwan Strait; East China Sea; Philippine Sea; Luzon Strait; South China Sea
- Planned by: China
- Commanded by: Xi Jinping
- Objective: Retaliate against Japanese prime minister Sanae Takaichi's comments on a potential Japanese military intervention during a Chinese attack on Taiwan; Test capabilities in sea-air combat readiness patrol, joint seizure of comprehensive superiority, blockade on key ports and areas, as well as all-dimensional deterrence outside the island chain
- Date: 29–30 December 2025 (1 day)
- Executed by: People's Liberation Army; Eastern Theater Command
- Outcome: Continuation of the Fourth Taiwan Strait Crisis

Justice Mission 2025 (Chinese: 正义使命—2025) was a large-scale military exercise conducted by the People's Republic of China around Taiwan from 29 to 30 December 2025. This was the eighth major military drill held around Taiwan since the beginning of the Fourth Taiwan Strait Crisis in August 2022.

== Background ==
The military exercise was announced against the backdrop of a diplomatic crisis between Japan and China and a decision made earlier in the month by the United States to sell Taiwan military equipment worth over $11 billion. Ministry of National Defense spokesperson Zhang Xiaogang warned "relevant countries" to "abandon the illusion of using Taiwan to contain China."

== Exercises ==
On 29 December, the People's Liberation Army (PLA)'s Eastern Theater Command deployed units from its ground force, navy, air force and rocket force to areas around Taiwan. Eastern Theater Command spokesperson Shi Yi announced that the drills would take place in the Taiwan Strait and areas to the north, southwest, southeast and east of the island. He said the exercises would focus on combat readiness, blockades of strategic areas, joint operations and deterring "Taiwan independence separatist forces" and "external interference forces". The exercise is the eighth military exercise held around Taiwan since 2022, as well as the first that had a publicly stated aim of deterring external involvement. Separately, the PLA said live-fire exercises were carried out in areas north and southwest of Taiwan, and also initially designated five zones for live-fire drills from 8:00 AM to 6:00 PM on 30 December, which the China Maritime Safety Administration later said had increased to seven. Ships and aircraft were warned to stay away from the zones. The zones crossed into Taiwan's territorial waters for the first time since the 2022 exercises that the Chinese military had held around Taiwan.

On one of its Chinese social media accounts, the Eastern Theater Command released a video that was shot by a drone which purported to show a view of Taipei 101. In addition, the China Coast Guard announced the start of patrols in waters near Matsu and Wuqiu. A report by government media China Central Television said the exercises included "maritime and airborne search-and-destroy operations, simulated strikes on land and live-fire naval drills" and focused on blockading the Port of Keelung and Kaohsiung. Commenting on the drills, Chinese foreign ministry spokesperson Lin Jian said attempts by external forces to use Taiwan to contain China would only push the region closer to war. Taiwan Affairs Office spokesperson Chen Binhua said the Taiwanese government was colluding with external forces to seek independence. Ministry of National Defense spokesperson Zhang Xiaogang said the PLA would not hesitate to fight pro-independence forces and organize anti-separatist and anti-interference actions in order to promote reunification and safeguard national sovereignty, unity, and territorial integrity. Chinese state-run tabloid Global Times connected the drills to US weapons sales.

As of 3:00 PM, Taiwanese Deputy Chief of the General Staff for Intelligence Hsieh Jih-sheng stated Taiwan detected 14 PLA warships and 14 Chinese Coast Guard vessels around Taiwan, as well as the detection of an "amphibious assault strike group" consisting of four ships in the southeastern water of Taiwan and 89 warplanes in the skies around Taiwan, with 67 of them entering Taiwan's response zone under Taiwan's monitoring and response. On the second day of the drills, several live rockets were fired from Pingtan Island. The Eastern Theatre Command subsequently said it had fired rockets into waters both north and south of Taiwan and released a video of firing what appeared to be a mobile PCH-191 rocket launcher firing into the sea. This was the first time China fired rockets into the Taiwan Strait since the 2022 exercises, with Taiwan's Ministry of National Defense stating the rockets landed near Taiwan's 24 nautical mile line. Unlike China's 2022 exercises, missiles were not fired over Taiwan. The ministry also stated that in the 24-hour period through 6:00 AM on 30 December, it had confirmed activity by 130 Chinese military fighters, drones and other aircraft around Taiwan, as well as 14 Chinese military ships and eight other Chinese ships. Hsieh stated that the PLA had fired 27 rockets into waters to the north and southwest of Taiwan.

== Impact ==
Taiwan's Civil Aviation Administration said it expected more than 100,000 travelers to be affected by the drills, with 857 international flights impacted and 84 domestic flights canceled. It added that routes to Kinmen and Matsu were blocked, affecting around 6,000 travelers.

== Reactions ==
=== Taiwan ===
Taiwanese president Lai Ching-te said that China's escalation of military pressure was part of an ongoing cognitive warfare campaign and "not something that a responsible power should do". Presidential Office spokesperson Karen Kuo said Taiwan condemned the Chinese government for using its military to intimidate and threaten neighboring countries. The Ministry of National Defense said the exercises undermined regional peace. The Mainland Affairs Council said the exercises disrupted Taiwan's civil aviation and maritime traffic. Democratic Progressive Party (DPP) spokesperson Wu Cheng said the drills undermined the Kuomintang's claims that cross-strait exchanges would ease tensions. In response, Kuomintang chairwoman Cheng Li-wun said the drills were caused by DPP's cross-strait policies and accused Lai Ching-te of provoking tensions. Taipei Mayor Chiang Wan-an of the Kuomintang condemned the drills as escalatory. Taiwan People's Party chairman Huang Kuo-chang condemned the drills, saying they would only deepen tensions. The Kuomintang and the Taiwan People's Party refused to support a motion in the Legislative Yuan condemning the drills.

=== Other countries and regions ===
- Australia: The Department of Foreign Affairs and Trade said that "Australia strongly opposes any actions that increase the risk of accident, miscalculation or escalation."
- Belarus: The Ministry of Foreign Affairs stated, "We support all efforts by the Chinese government to achieve national reunification, protect sovereignty, and territorial integrity."
- European Union: The European External Action Service issued a statement saying the exercise "increases cross-strait tensions and endangers international peace and stability".
- Japan: The Japanese government conveyed its concerns to China over the military exercises, saying that it expected issues around Taiwan to be resolved peacefully through dialogue.
- Lithuania: The Ministry of Foreign Affairs stated that the military drills "escalate cross-Strait tensions and threaten international peace and security".
- New Zealand: The Ministry of Foreign Affairs and Trade called for "peaceful resolution of cross-Strait issues through de-escalation and dialogue, and for the avoidance of actions that may undermine peace and stability".
- Philippines: The Philippines government stated, "Developments that raise the risk of tension, miscalculation, or conflict in the Taiwan Strait and the wider region are deeply worrying, particularly given their potential impact on regional stability, trade routes, and the safety and livelihood of the many Filipinos residing and working in Taiwan."
- Russia: State media TASS published an interview with Foreign Minister Sergey Lavrov, in which he stated that "Russia will support China" in the event of a "Taiwan incident".
- South Korea: Ministry of Foreign Affairs spokesperson Park Il said South Korea hoped "cross-strait relations will develop peacefully through dialogue and cooperation".
- United Kingdom: A Foreign, Commonwealth and Development Office spokesperson said that "China's military exercises around Taiwan this week increase cross-strait tensions and the risk of escalation" and stated UK considers "Taiwan issue one to be settled peacefully by the people on both sides of the Taiwan Strait through constructive dialogue, without the threat or use of force or coercion".
- United States: When asked about the exercises, the United States President Donald Trump said, "I have a great relationship with President Xi [Jinping]. And he hasn't told me anything about it. I certainly have seen it", and stated "I don't believe he's going to be doing it" in an apparent reference to a possible invasion. He also dismissed concerns about the exercises by saying, "They've been doing naval exercises for 20 years in that area. Now people take it a little bit differently." U.S. Department of State spokesman Tommy Pigott stated that the drills "unnecessarily" elevated regional tensions and called on China to "cease its military pressure".

=== Other ===
The Inter-Parliamentary Alliance on China said that China's exercises were a "...deliberate escalation of coercive pressure" on Taiwan.

== See also ==
- 2022 Chinese military exercises around Taiwan
- 2025 Chinese naval exercises in the Tasman Sea
- Chinese unification
- Cross-strait relations
- Strait Thunder–2025A
