= Air Defense Identification Zone (Taiwan) =

Air defense identification zone in the Taiwan Strait

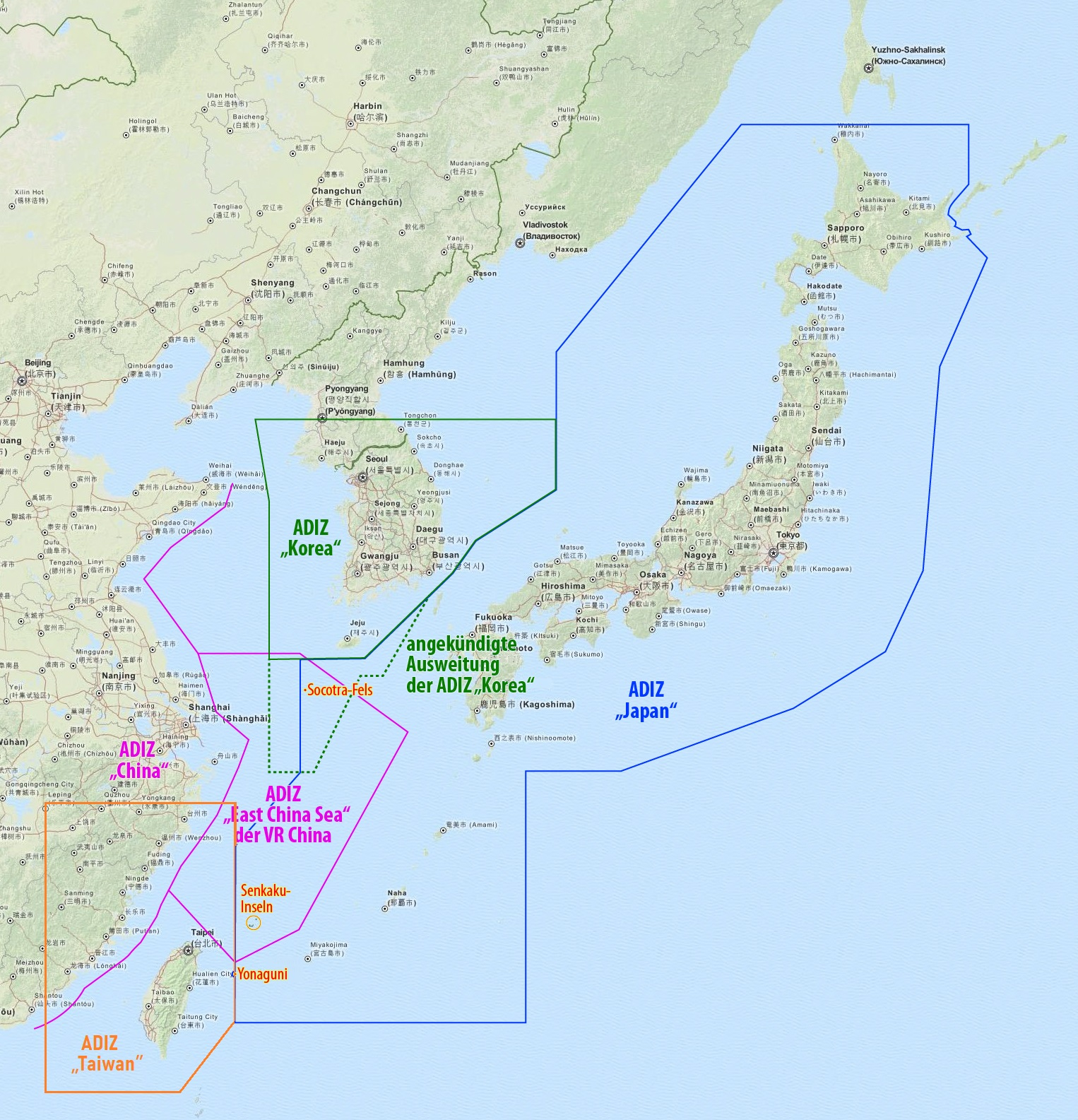
The Taiwan Air Defense Identification Zone as shown in orange boundaries in the lower left of the diagram

The Taiwan Air Defense Identification Zone is an air defense identification zone of the Republic of China (Taiwan), which covers the island of Taiwan, its surroundings, and a large portion of mainland China. A theoretical "median line" was defined in 1955 one year after the zone was established. The ADIZ includes international airspace that countries can arbitrarily monitor. In recent years, it has seen an increased number of sorties flown by People's Liberation Army (PLA) aircraft.

== Background ==
The ROC's ADIZ covers most of the Taiwan Strait, Taiwan Province, parts of Fujian (that are administered by the ROC and by the People's Republic of China (PRC) separately), Zhejiang, and Jiangxi, and part of the East China Sea. It was designed and created by the United States Armed Forces (USAF) in 1954 and the basis of Taipei Flight Information Region. The zone is monitored by PAVE PAWS radar located near Hsinchu and operated with help from US advisors.

== Median line ==
A theoretical line was defined in 1955 down the middle of the strait, supposedly named after USAF General Benjamin O. Davis Jr. Aircraft from Taiwan flew combat missions on the other side until they lost control of mainland airspace to the PLAAF after the Second Taiwan Strait Crisis. ROCAF U-2 planes continued to fly over the mainland until 1968. The line was avoided by the PRC until 1999 when groups of PLAAF aircraft crossed over in response to "state-to-state" comments made by Lee Teng-hui. Beijing has never recognized the line. The PRC has flown an increased number of sorties across the median line, although it tries not to do so when relations with Taiwan are good.

== Recent PLA activities ==
Around 9% of Taiwan's national defence budget in 2020 reportedly goes into the response to Chinese sorties, which usually involve flights inside the southwest part of the ADIZ, crossing of the median, or circumnavigation. Beginning in September 2020, the Ministry of National Defense of Taiwan (MND) began reporting PLA sorties in the ADIZ that flew beyond mainland territorial airspace.

During 2021, 972 such sorties were flown by the PLA. This increased to 1,727 in 2022, with the most on any single day being on 5 August after the 2022 visit by Nancy Pelosi to Taiwan, when 49 sorties were flown.

On 26 December 2022, a record 71 PLA aircraft entered the ADIZ, including 43 that crossed the median line.

After the United States approved a weapons sale to Taiwan in 2023, the MND reported thirteen PLA aircraft that crossed the median line on 25 and 26 May, including two Xian H-6 bombers.

== See also ==
- T-Dome
