= Yongan LNG Terminal =

LNG terminal in Yong'an, Kaohsiung, Taiwan

- 永安液化天然氣廠
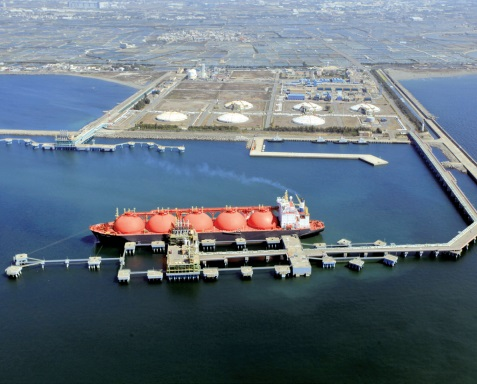
- Interactive map of the Yongan LNG Terminal area

General information
- Type: LNG terminal
- Location: Yong'an, Kaohsiung, Taiwan
- Coordinates: 22°48′35.4″N 120°12′19.2″E
- Opened: 1990
- Owner: CPC Corporation

The Yongan LNG Terminal (traditional Chinese: 永安液化天然氣廠; simplified Chinese: 永安液化天然气厂; pinyin: Yǒng'ān Yèhuà Tiānránqì Chǎng) is a liquefied natural gas (LNG) terminal at Yong'an District, Kaohsiung, Taiwan.

== History ==
The operation of the terminal started in 1990 with 1.5 million tons capacity. The terminal was expanded to 4.0 million tons capacity during the second phase expansion which was completed in December 1996. It was then expanded again to 7.44 million tons capacity in the third phase of expansion which commenced in July 1996 and completed in December 2002.

== Technical specifications ==
The terminal has a current capacity of 7.44 million tons annually.

== See also ==
- List of LNG terminals
