= Taichung LNG Terminal =

LNG terminal in Wuqi, Taichung, Taiwan

- 台中液化天然氣接收站
- Interactive map of the Taichung LNG Terminal area

General information
- Type: LNG terminal
- Location: Wuqi, Taichung, Taiwan
- Coordinates: 24°15′10.2″N 120°29′43.9″E
- Inaugurated: 16 July 2009
- Owner: CPC Corporation

The Taichung LNG Terminal (traditional Chinese: 台中液化天然氣接收站; simplified Chinese: 台中液化天然气接收站; pinyin: Táizhōng Yèhuà Tiānránqì Jiēshōu Zhàn) is a liquefied natural gas (LNG) terminal at Port of Taichung, Wuqi District, Taichung, Taiwan.

== History ==
The terminal was inaugurated on 16 July 2009 by CPC Corporation as the second LNG terminal in Taiwan. On 24 August 2020, Port of Taichung operator Taiwan International Ports Corporation signed an agreement with CPC Corporation to lease the area next to west wharf number 11 and 12 of the port for the expansion of Taichung LNG Terminal.

== Technical specifications ==
The terminal supplies vaporized LNG to Tatan Power Plant in Guanyin District, Taoyuan City via subsea gas pipeline.

== See also ==
- List of LNG terminals
