= Kao An-kuo =

Taiwanese general

- 高安國
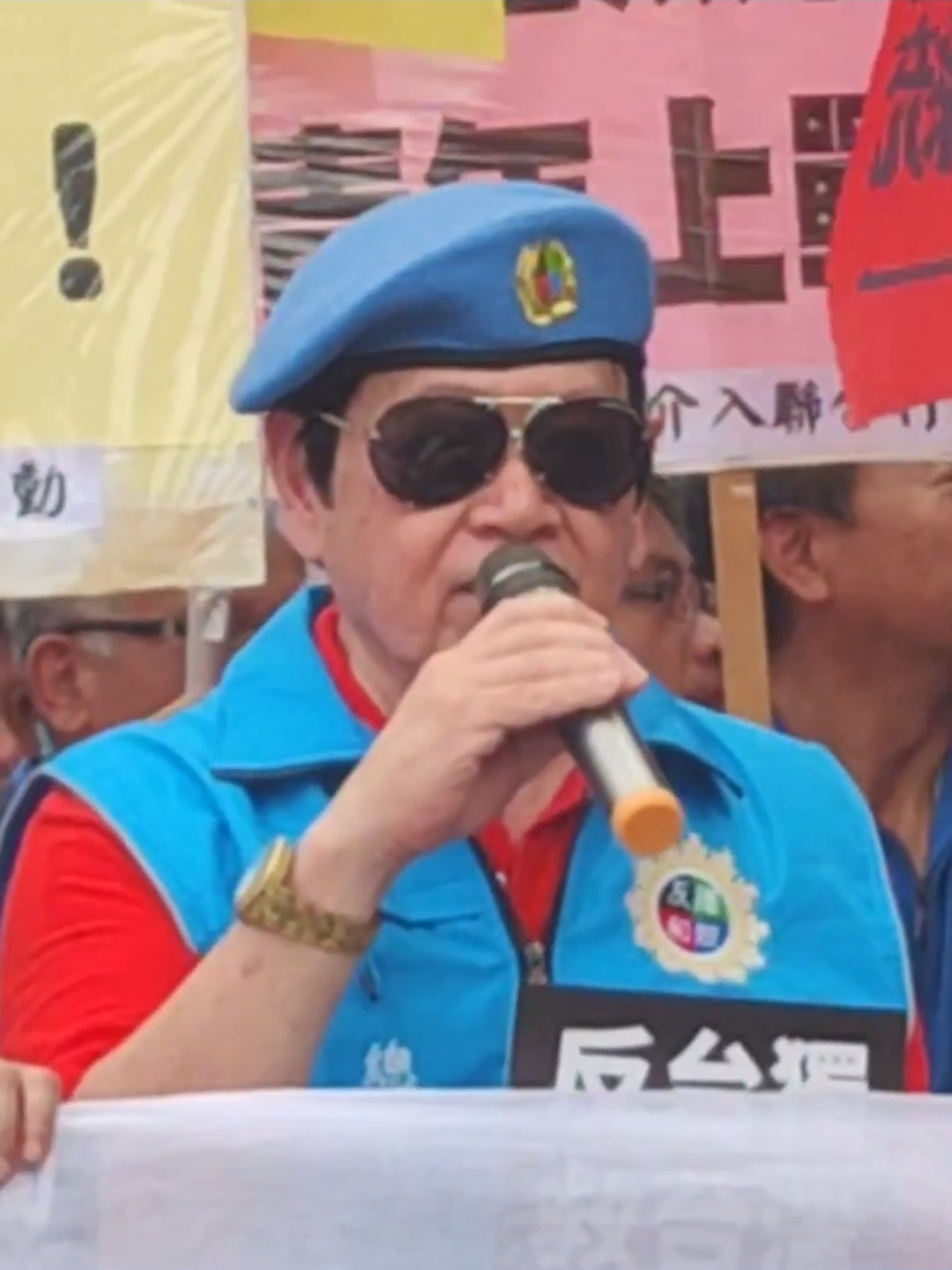
- Kao speaks on the street in 2023

Personal details
- Born: 3 April 1944 (age 82) Xiangyin County, Hunan
- Party: Kuomintang
- Education: Republic of China Military Academy; University of Leicester

Military service
- Allegiance: Republic of China
- Branch/service: Republic of China Army
- Rank: Lieutenant general

Kao An-kuo (Chinese: 高安國; pinyin: Gāo Ānguó) (born 3 April 1944) is a Taiwanese retired lieutenant general.

== Life ==
Kao was born in Xiangyin County, Hunan, Republic of China in 1944. His father Gao Dulun was a KMT major general who fought in the Sino-Japanese War and the Chinese Civil War. He moved with his family to Taiwan from Yulin Port, Sanya, Hainan Province in 1949 during the Battle of Hainan Island.

In December 2014, he attended the China Cross-Strait Military Generals Forum held in Xiamen.

In 2018, he established the "Taiwanese Military Government of the Republic of China" (Chinese: 中華民國台灣軍政府), aiming to overthrow the Taiwanese government.

In 2021, Kao reportedly made a YouTube video in which he called the Taiwanese military to overthrow the Democratic Progressive Party (DPP) leadership and surrender to China. He called the DPP "ethnic traitors" (hanjian) who were colluding with the US to damage China. The video was widely condemned and sparked calls for him to be charged with treason.

== Indictment ==
On 22 January 2025, Kao along with five other accomplices were indicted for violating the Taiwanese National Security Act. He was charged in suspicion of espionage, allegedly accepting ~NT$9,620,000 in funds by the mainland Chinese government to form an organisation for the Chinese Communist Party to establish armed support groups and operate bases in an event of a Chinese invasion on Taiwanese land.

Kao's group also allegedly used drones to carry out surveillance exercises over military training operations and equipment, sending their results to the Chinese government.

In October 2025, Kao was sentenced to imprisonment for 7.5 years.
