= Yuyuan Tantian =

Chinese government social media account

Yuyuan Tantian (Chinese: 玉渊谭天; pinyin: Yùyuān Tántiān) is a social media account affiliated with the China Central Television (CCTV).

== History ==
Yuyuan Tantian was founded on 6 April 2019. It is a news column established by China Central Television in the context of the China–United States trade war. Its name comes from Yuyuantan Park, which is opposite the headquarters building of China Central Television. In March 2019, Yuyuan Tantian registered a Weibo account and began publishing articles. At that time, she used her personal name and called herself "a female PhD in economics". In August of the same year, Sun Yusheng, deputy director of China Media Group, confirmed for the first time that Yuyuan Tantian was a self-media brand created by the station. Qian Wei, director of the News and New Media Center of China Media Group, said that the new media accounts of China Media Group such as Yuyuan Tantian have "become light cavalry capable of fighting tough battles in the public opinion field, adding important strength to the "toolbox" of China Media Group's public opinion guidance".

== Reactions ==
Lu Qiu Luwei, associate professor at Hong Kong Baptist University, said that the practice of Chinese state media creating "small accounts" is not new. He said that small accounts have more freedom than official accounts, and when information is proven to be inaccurate, official media and the government can promptly sever ties.
