= Median line of the Taiwan Strait =

The median line of the Taiwan Strait is a theoretical maritime boundary defined by drawing a median line through that strait. It symbolizes the de facto border between China and Taiwan along the strait that connects the East and the South China seas.

In 1955, a United States Air Force commander Benjamin O. Davis Jr. proposed the idea of the median line (the Davis Line) to reduce the risk of a new cross-strait crisis after the first one. No agreed boundaries are established in the strait because both the People's Republic of China (PRC) and the Republic of China (ROC, which controls Taiwan) claim sovereignty over both sides of it.

As the line has never been formally agreed, its coordinates are not clearly defined in terms of geography. The PRC does not recognize the principle of a median line.

The ROC has officially recognized a median line since 26 May 2004, when its defence minister Lee Jye announced certain coordinates of points on the line. In 2008, a report gave further coordinates. The defence ministry defined the line further on 30 July 2019.
