= Matthew Miller (spokesperson) =

American public official (born 1973/1974)

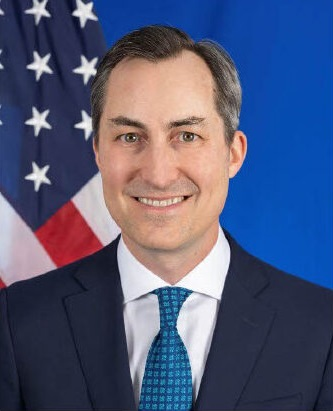

30th Spokesperson for the United States Department of State
- In office April 24, 2023 – January 20, 2025
- President: Joe Biden
- Deputy: Vedant Patel
- Preceded by: Ned Price
- Succeeded by: Tammy Bruce

Personal details
- Born: Matthew Alan Miller; 1973 or 1974 (age 52–53)
- Party: Democratic
- Education: University of Texas at Austin

Matthew Alan Miller (born 1973 or 1974) is a former American public official who was spokesperson for the United States Department of State from 2023 to 2025. A longtime Democratic Party communications operative, he previously served in the Obama administration and for multiple Democratic presidential campaigns.

During his tenure as spokesperson for the State Department, he addressed issues including the Russo-Ukrainian war (2022–present), 2023 Chinese military exercises around Taiwan, and the Gaza war following the October 7 attacks in Israel. Some of Miller's statements on the Gaza conflict, U.S. policy toward Hamas, and responses to international criticism of the war and allegations of Gaza genocide drew criticism. After leaving office, Miller stated that European recognition of Palestine and pro-Palestinian protests were appropriate, said the Biden administration put insufficient pressure on Israel, accused Israeli soldiers of war crimes while rejecting claims of genocide, and condemned Israel for sabotaging ceasefire efforts.

== Early life and education ==
Miller was born in 1973 or 1974. As of 2010, his mother was a retired management analyst for the U.S. Department of Agriculture, and his father was a retired pastor. He graduated with honors from the University of Texas at Austin.

== Career ==
Miller has worked for Democratic U.S. Senator Robert Menendez, as well as the 2004 Kerry and the 2012 Obama presidential campaigns. During the Obama administration, Miller headed the Office of Public Affairs at the Department of Justice, and served as the spokesman for U.S. Attorney General Eric Holder.

After the 2020 U.S. presidential election, Miller was part of the Biden presidential transition. During the early days of the Biden administration, he led the efforts to get Antony Blinken's nomination as U.S. Secretary of State confirmed. In 2022, he coordinated communications efforts regarding Russia's invasion of Ukraine for the U.S. National Security Council. Miller then worked for management and communications firm Vianovo, while also appearing as an analyst on MSNBC.

=== Department of State spokesperson ===
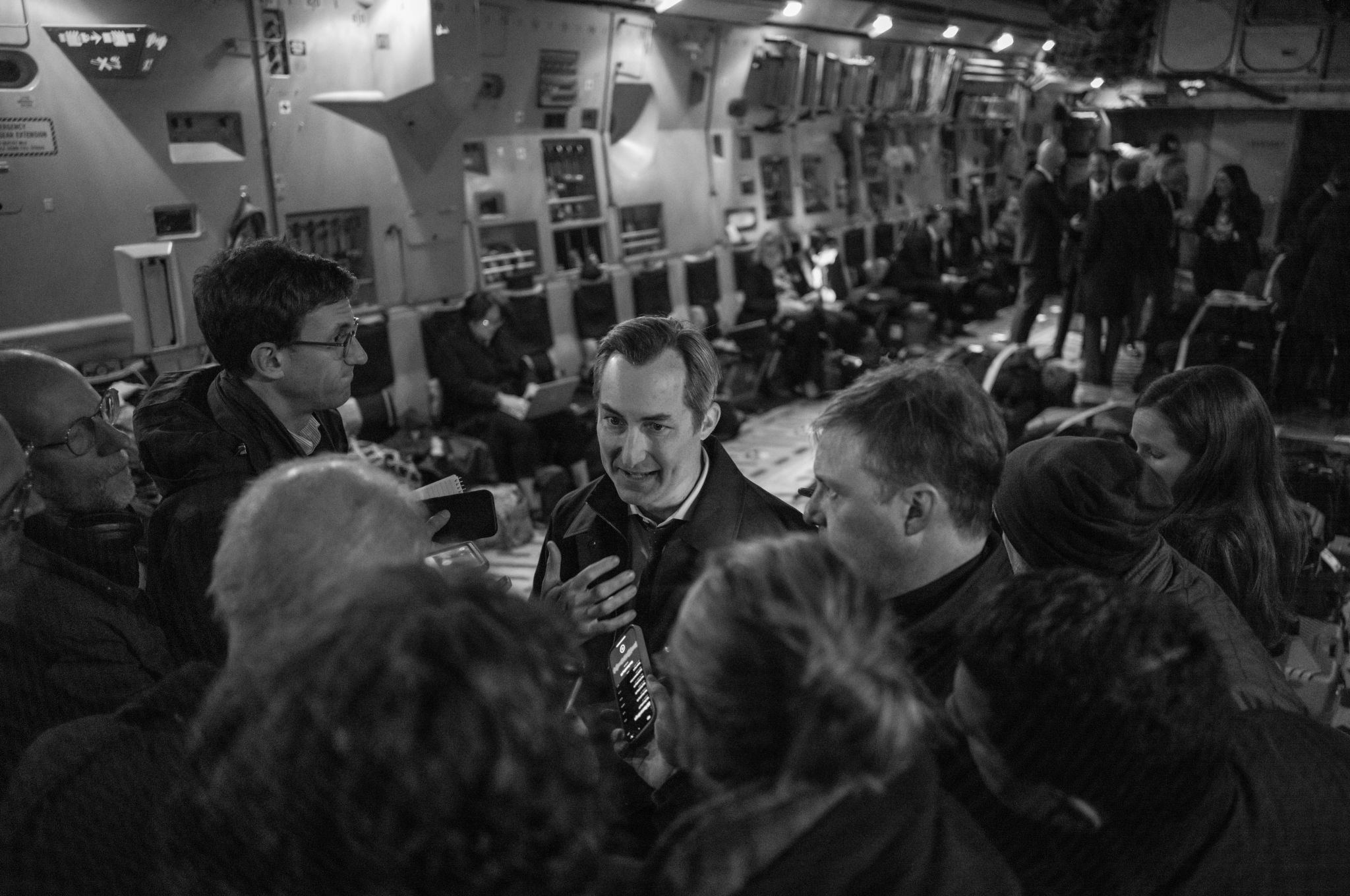
Miller (center) fields questions from reporters including (visible, from left) Michael Birnbaum, Tom Bateman, and Michael Crowley on a military aircraft on December 13, 2024.

On April 11, 2023, Miller was named as the spokesperson for the United States Department of State, succeeding Ned Price. He started in this new position on April 24, 2023.

He has been critical of Russia, including for escalation of its invasion of Ukraine, detention of Evan Gershkovich and suppression of information from Russian citizens in relation to slowing connections to YouTube in the country. A deepfake created using spliced footage from multiple press briefings of Miller saying Belgorod was an appropriate target for Ukrainian strikes and that the city had been evacuated circulated in May 2024; he denounced the deepfake as "disinformation". Voice of America described the deepfake as having hallmarks of the Russian information war against Ukraine. Miller was banned from Russia in retaliation for American sanctions on Russians and his role in outlining American foreign policy.

He expressed concerns about Chinese support for the war and condemned Chinese military drills near Taiwan following a speech by Taiwanese president Lai Ching-te and Chinese withdrawal from arms control talks following American arms sales to Taiwan.

Miller served as the spokesperson during and after the October 7 attacks and the subsequent Gaza war. Miller said "too many innocent Palestinians" had been killed following injuries and deaths at an aid site in February 2024 and called for Israel to increase the flow of aid to Gaza. He called for a full investigation into August 2024 allegations of sexual assault of Palestinian prisoners by Israel Defense Force (IDF) members and condemned a strike by the IDF on a building in the Gaza Strip that killed at least 55 people in October 2024, calling it "a horrifying incident with a horrifying result". The same month, Miller said Israel's efforts to resolve humanitarian issues in Gaza had been insufficient.

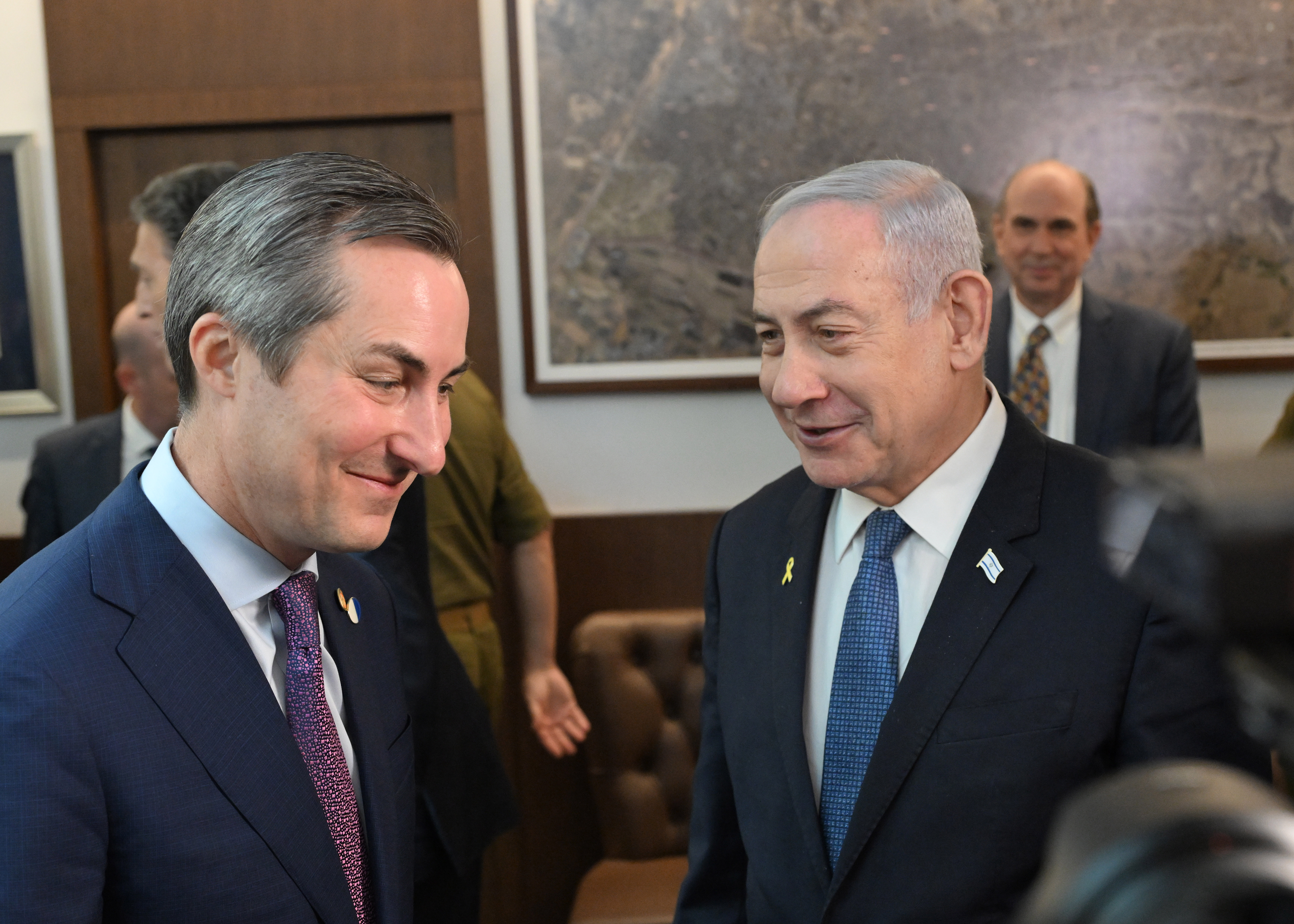
Miller speaking with Israeli Prime Minister Benjamin Netanyahu in Israel on October 22, 2024

Miller was accused of inappropriate levity when discussing the Gaza war by Sam Husseini and Matt Lee, with the former accusing Miller of smirking when talking about the war's death toll. Miller denied the accusation. In response to a question about aid failing to reach Gaza citizens, Miller said that Israel had failed to properly facilitate its transfer, but that the evaluation period was 30 days and it "wasn't the end of the semester", drawing a rebuke from Lee. Mark O'Connell criticized Biden administration spokespeople generally and Miller specifically in The Irish Times, writing that Miller's "apparent disregard" for the people in Gaza led to his levity. In defining American opposition to United Nations Special Rapporteur on the occupied Palestinian territories Francesca Albanese and her report finding that Israel had committed genocide in Gaza, Miller alleged Albanese had a history of antisemitic comments, drawing condemnation and calls for his resignation by Trita Parsi and others. Miller later said he was referring to specific remarks made by Albanese in 2022 regarding a "Jewish lobby controlling America", reported by The Times of Israel. In September 2024, he said that the United States has always been "committed to the destruction of Hamas" while also seeking a "diplomatic resolution to conflict in the Middle East". Current Affairs editor-in-chief Nathan J. Robinson called the position self-contradictory, as Hamas is a party in the conflict. In discussing the death of Kamel Jawad, an American killed in the 2024 Israeli invasion of Lebanon, Miller said it was the State Department's understanding that Jawad was a legal permanent resident rather than a citizen. This was criticized by the Council on American–Islamic Relations. Miller subsequently said the department was examining its records to confirm his citizenship, and it later confirmed he was a citizen.

On January 20, 2025, he was succeeded by Tammy Bruce. He credited incoming members of the second Trump administration for their assistance negotiating a ceasefire in the conflict. In a 2025 interview with Sky News, Miller described recognition of Palestine by European countries and the 2024 pro-Palestinian protests on university campuses as "appropriate", and stated belief that the Biden administration could have done more to pressure the Israeli government to agree to ceasefire. While Miller has stated that Israeli soldiers are guilty of war crimes in the Gaza war, he also believes that Israel's actions in Gaza are not genocide. In August 2025, Miller said that the Israeli government had sabotaged the ceasefire agreement on multiple occasions.

=== Post-Biden administration (2025-present) ===
Following the end of the Biden administration, Miller returned to work as a partner at the Tucker Eskew founded consulting and public relations firm Vianovo. Miller had worked at Vianovo for over a decade prior to his tenure in the State Department.

== Personal life ==
Miller married his second wife in 2010. His first marriage ended in a divorce.

Political offices
Preceded by Ned Price	Spokesperson for the United States Department of State; 2023–2025	Succeeded by Tammy Bruce
