= 2022 visit by Nancy Pelosi to Taiwan =

Diplomatic visit by US House speaker Nancy Pelosi and five other Democratic House members

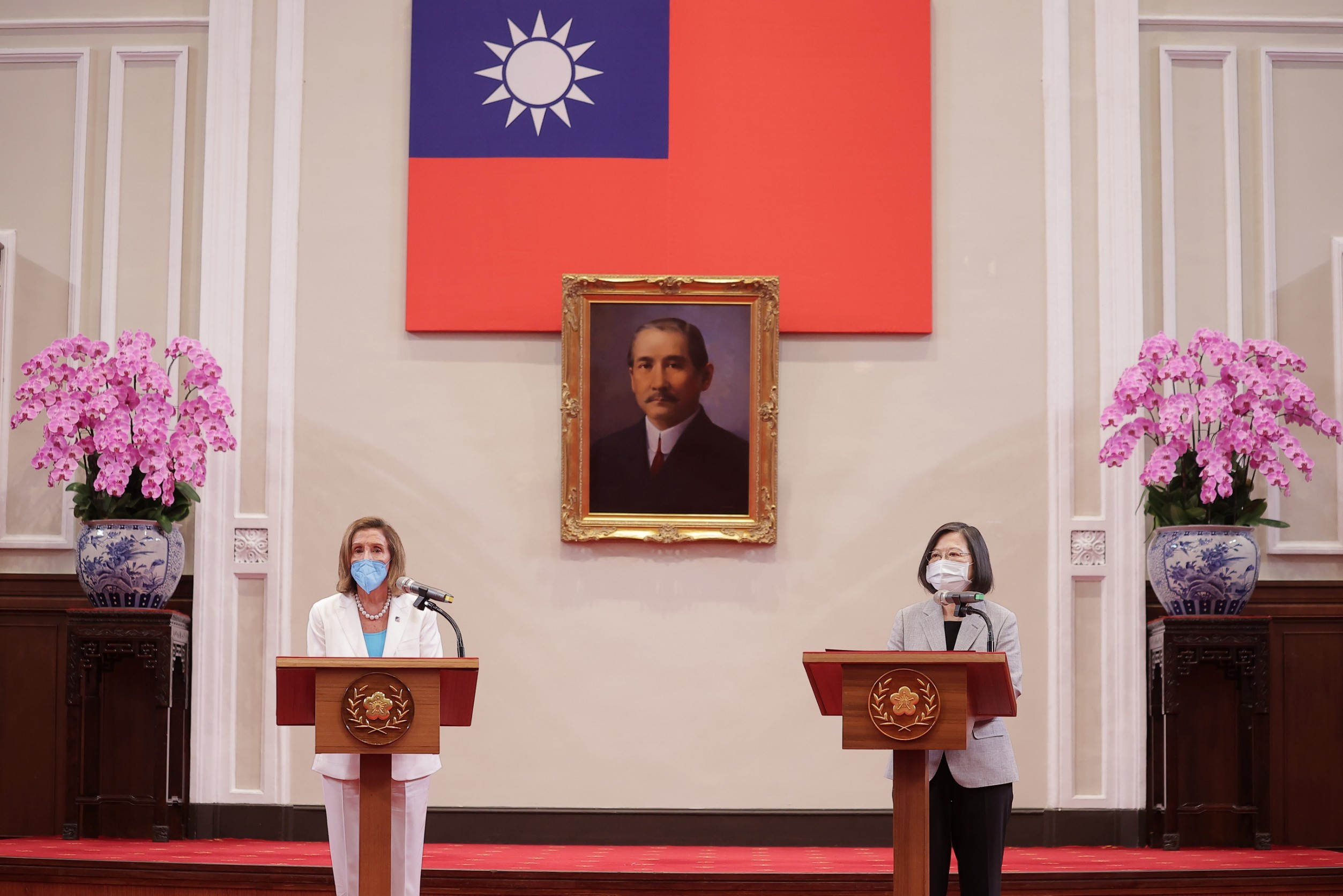
- Nancy Pelosi and President Tsai Ing-wen hold a press conference in Taiwan's Presidential Office.
- Date: August 2–3, 2022
- Location: Taipei, Taiwan

American politician Nancy Pelosi, while serving as the speaker of the U.S. House of Representatives, visited Taiwan on August 2, 2022. A delegation of five Democratic Party members of the House of Representatives accompanied Pelosi on the visit. The two-day trip to Taiwan was part of a tour of Asia that also included stops in Singapore, Malaysia, South Korea, and Japan. President Joe Biden discouraged but did not prevent Pelosi from going; the White House later affirmed her right to visit the island.

Taiwanese foreign minister Joseph Wu received Pelosi and her delegation. Shortly after her arrival, Pelosi said that her visit was a sign of the United States' "unwavering commitment to supporting Taiwan's vibrant democracy". Pelosi's trip included a visit to the Legislative Yuan and a meeting with President Tsai Ing-wen before her departure for South Korea.

The visit was condemned by the Chinese government, which sent warnings through diplomatic channels to the U.S. government. After Pelosi's departure, China commenced large-scale military exercises encircling Taiwan, which ran for a week from August 4 to 11, 2022, initiating the Fourth Taiwan Strait Crisis. Additional "regular" exercises were announced to run in the Yellow Sea and Bohai Sea until August 15 and September 8 respectively, but ended early on August 10.

== Background ==
Mainland China controlled by the People's Republic of China (in green) and Taiwan controlled by the Republic of China (in orange) on the location map

The last visit to Taiwan by a US Speaker was in April 1997, by Republican politician Newt Gingrich. As Speaker of the United States House of Representatives, Pelosi is second-in-line to the US presidency after the vice-president, making her the highest ranking US official to visit Taiwan since then. In 2021, she had already called for a diplomatic boycott of the 2022 Winter Olympics in Beijing, China. On April 7, 2022, Japanese Fuji News Network first reported Pelosi's intentions of visiting Taiwan. Her Asian trip was postponed after she was tested positive for COVID-19. On July 19, 2022, the Financial Times revealed the possibility of Pelosi visiting Taiwan as part of her Asian tour.

Pelosi's tour of Asia was announced on July 31, 2022, to "reaffirm America's unshakeable commitment to our allies and friends in the region", with an itinerary initially limited to Singapore, Malaysia, South Korea and Japan. On the morning of the day of the visit, August 2, it was still not known for certain whether the visit to Taiwan would take place. White House Coordinator for Strategic Communications at the National Security Council representative John Kirby said on the evening of August 1 (EDT) that China could respond with a missile launch near Taiwan or could conduct other military exercises to show its disapproval of the visit of an American politician. At the same time, Kirby said that the US was not afraid of threats from China and would not sit idly by in the event of any aggression.

In an opinion article for The Washington Post, Pelosi wrote on August 2: "We take this trip at a time when the world faces a choice between autocracy and democracy. As Russia wages its premeditated, illegal war against Ukraine, killing thousands of innocents – even children – it is essential that America and our allies make clear that we never give in to autocrats." Pelosi has long criticised the PRC and is outspoken about its alleged human rights abuses, also opposing the US forming closer economic ties with the PRC government in the 2000s.

On July 29, Taiwan finished conducting its five-day Han Kuang exercise, the country's largest annual military exercise, which included simulated interception of hostile attacks from sea and air.

== Visit ==
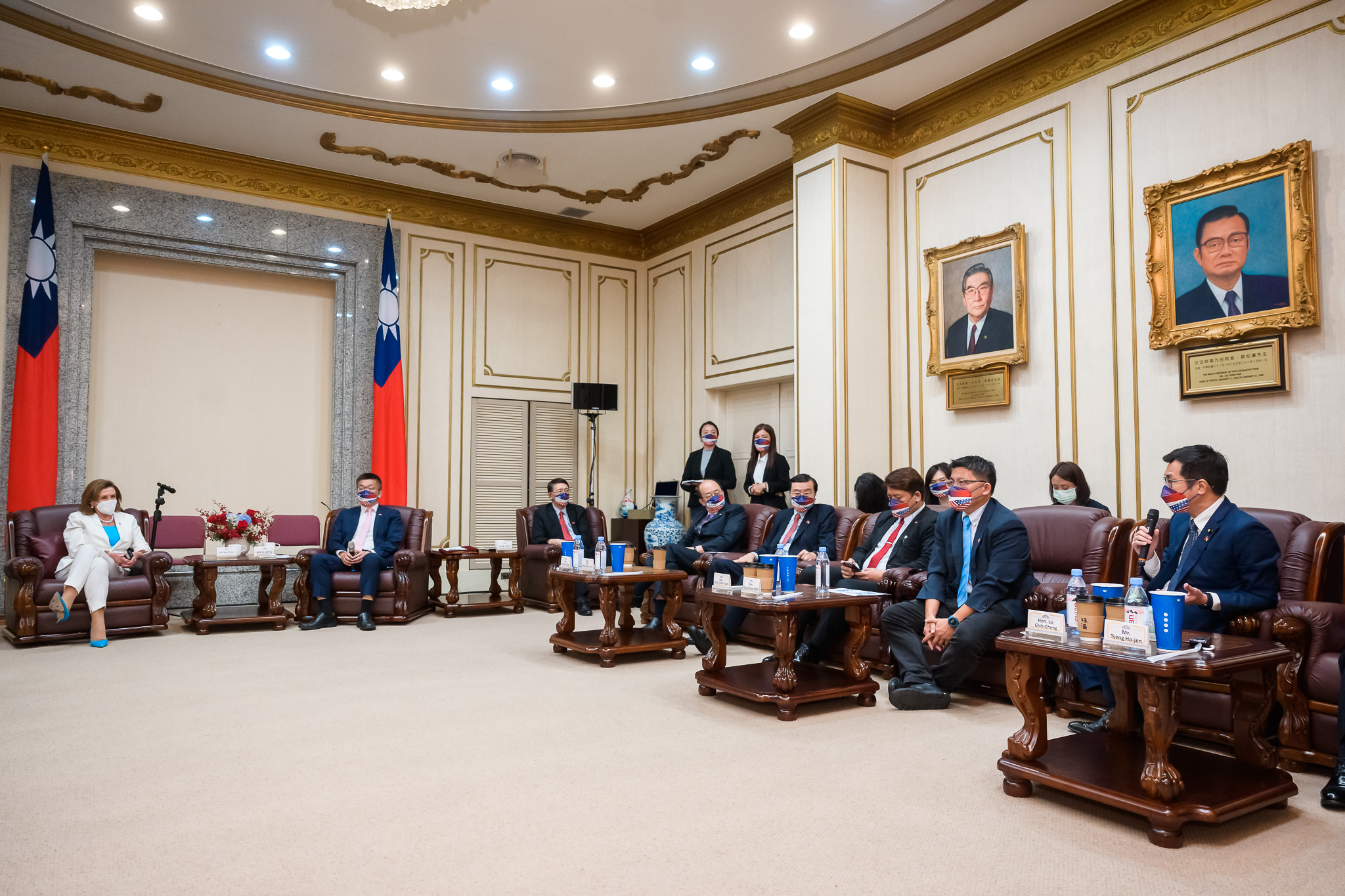
Nancy Pelosi's visit to the Legislative Yuan of the Republic of China (Taiwan).

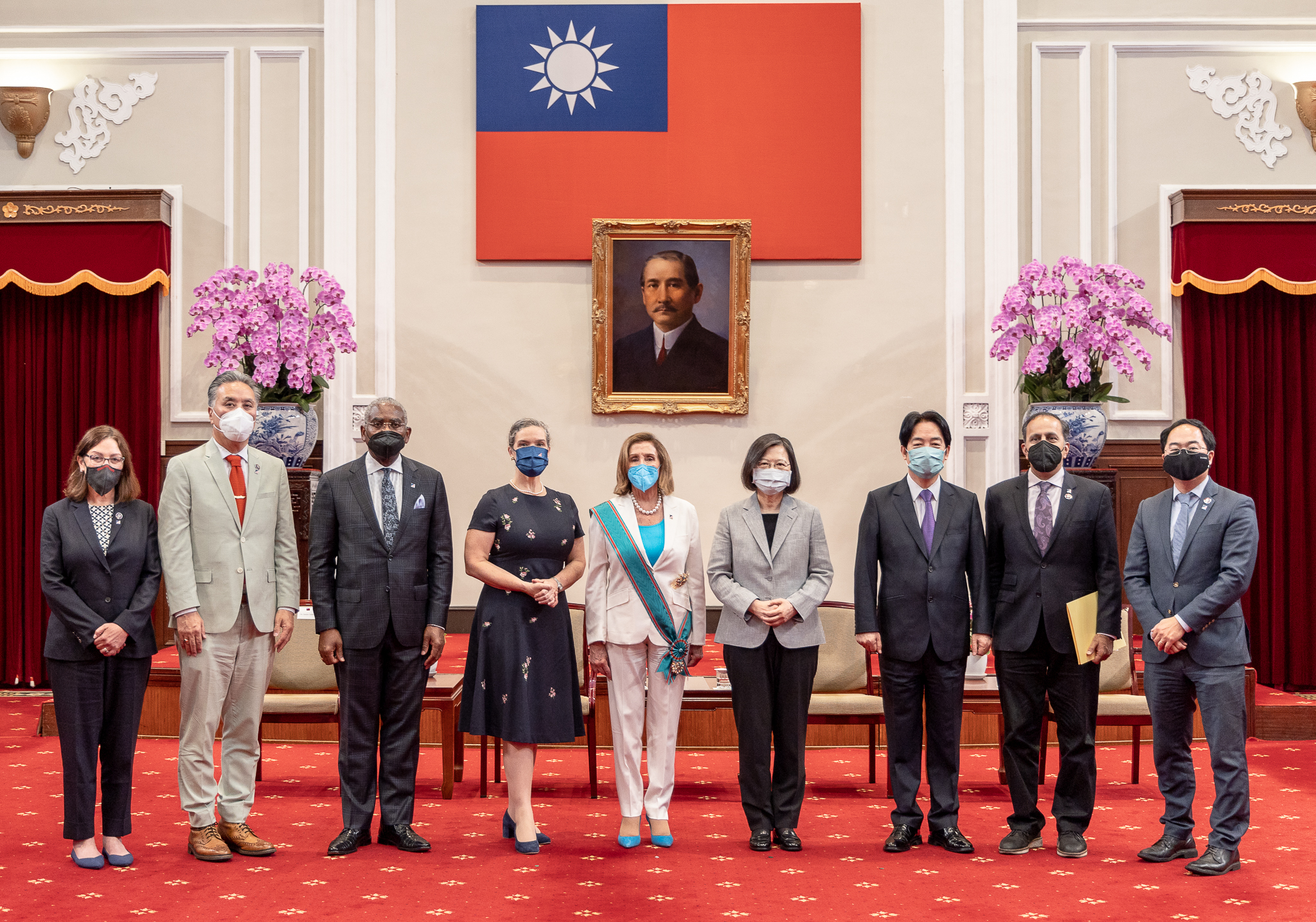
Nancy Pelosi's delegation meeting Taiwanese president Tsai Ing-wen and vice president Lai Ching-te at the Presidential Office Building with Sandra Oudkirk, Director of the American Institute in Taiwan.

After departing Malaysia, Pelosi's delegation arrived without incident in Taipei, Taiwan, at 10:43 pm National Standard Time on the evening of August 2 via a US Air Force transport plane and was received by Minister of Foreign Affairs Joseph Wu and Sandra Oudkirk, Director of the Taipei Office of the American Institute in Taiwan (AIT). Pelosi tweeted that her visit was a sign of the United States' "unwavering commitment to supporting Taiwan's vibrant democracy." Upon Pelosi's arrival, both the ruling Democratic Progressive Party and opposition Kuomintang endorsed the visit and Taipei 101 illuminated a welcome message for the delegation. The delegation stayed overnight at the Grand Hyatt Taipei.

Pelosi's delegation included the following members of the US House of Representatives: (Note: Michael McCaul (R-TX) was invited but declined due to a personal obligation conflicting with the visit.)

- Gregory Meeks (D-NY)
- Raja Krishnamoorthi (D-IL)
- Suzan DelBene (D-WA)
- Andy Kim (D-NJ)
- Mark Takano (D-CA)

Following a breakfast meeting at the American Institute in Taiwan on the morning of August 3, Pelosi visited the Legislative Yuan with her delegation. While there, she was received by vice president of the Legislative Yuan, Tsai Chi-chang and addressed the legislature in a short speech, saying Taiwan was "one of the freest societies in the world". She advocated further US economic cooperation with Taiwan with the CHIPS Act, and in areas relating to climate change, the COVID-19 pandemic, and democracy.

She proceeded to the Presidential Office Building and met with President Tsai Ing-wen, who awarded her the Order of Propitious Clouds (with Special Grand Cordon). A closed media session was held afterwards with only Taiwan's Central News Agency, Bloomberg News, and Japan's Asahi Shimbun in attendance. Pelosi expressed her views that China's anger at her visit was due to her being a woman and not because of her rank as the highest-level American politician to have visited Taiwan in 25 years.

At noon, President Tsai hosted a banquet at the Taipei Guest House to entertain Pelosi's delegation. Taiwan Semiconductor Manufacturing Company founder Morris Chang, chairman Mark Liu, and Pegatron vice chairman Jason Cheng were invited to attend.

The delegation's final activity was a visit, at about 2:40 pm for an hour, to the National Human Rights Museum at the Jing-Mei White Terror Memorial Park documenting the White Terror period in Taiwan. During the visit, they met with Wu'erkaixi, a former student leader of the Tiananmen Square protests, Lam Wing-kee, a dissident Hong Kong bookseller, and Lee Ming-che, a Taiwanese activist who was imprisoned in China and Kelsang Gyaltsen Bawa, the representative of the Tibet Office in Taiwan.

In a press release, Pelosi declared that the visit "in no way contradicts longstanding United States policy, guided by the Taiwan Relations Act of 1979, US-China Joint Communiques and the Six Assurances. The United States continues to oppose unilateral efforts to change the status quo." NSC representative Kirby reiterated this perspective at a press conference held during the visit saying, "The Speaker's visit is totally consistent with our longstanding One China policy." Pelosi departed Taiwan for South Korea after 6:00 pm on the evening of August 3.

== Reactions ==
=== United States ===
President Joe Biden initially cautioned against the reported trip on July 20, 2022, saying the US military had assessed "it is not a good idea right now". However, on August 1, White House national security spokesman John Kirby said that Pelosi had the right to visit Taiwan, adding that the United States would not be intimidated by China's expected escalation in response to the potential trip.

American politicians, officials, and analysts condemned the series of retaliatory measures that China undertook against Taiwan and the United States for the visit. US Secretary of State Antony Blinken issued this statement:

The United States has conveyed to the PRC consistently and repeatedly that we do not seek and will not provoke a crisis. President Tsai has said the same thing. China has chosen to overreact and use Speaker Pelosi’s visit as a pretext to increase provocative military activity in and around the Taiwan Strait. We anticipated that China might take steps like this. In fact, we described this exact scenario. The fact is the Speaker's visit was peaceful. There is no justification for this extreme, disproportionate, and escalatory military response. Let me say again that nothing has changed about our "one China" policy, which is guided by the Taiwan Relations Act, the three Communiques, and the Six Assurances. We don't want unilateral changes to the status quo from either side. We do not support Taiwan independence. We expect cross-strait differences to be resolved peacefully, not coercively or by force.

Similarly, Republican Senators exhibited rare support for Pelosi. Senate Republican leader Mitch McConnell was joined by 25 other Republican senators in expressing support for Pelosi's trip to Taiwan. In justifying their support, the Republican senators called the trip "consistent with the United States' One China policy". Although Texas Senator Ted Cruz was absent from the joint statement, he praised Nancy Pelosi's visit to Taiwan while criticising Biden's lack of support. Similarly, Senators Rick Scott and Lindsey Graham also expressed approval of the trip despite their absence from the joint statement.

The White House announced on August 4 that the Pentagon has directed the aircraft carrier USS Ronald Reagan to remain in the area near Taiwan "to monitor the situation" as China launches missiles in the region. Furthermore, NSC spokesperson John Kirby said that the US has delayed a planned test of a Minuteman III ICBM to avoid increasing tensions. It had also summoned the Chinese ambassador Qin Gang to protest China's military actions in response to Pelosi's visit.

=== People's Republic of China ===
Areas announced for military exercises and training activities by the People's Republic of China following Pelosi's visit

The People's Republic of China strongly condemned the visit, and called the visit a "provocation" by the US that "seriously infringes upon China's sovereignty". In a telephone meeting between US President Joe Biden and PRC leader Xi Jinping the week before, the PRC government warned the US to abide by the One China principle, that "those who play with fire will perish by it", and that the US would be "playing with fire" if Biden were to allow Pelosi to visit the ROC. Xi stated that China had no intention of going to war with the US over the visit and that both sides needed to maintain peace and security and avoid a "full-blown crisis".

On August 2, PRC ambassador to the UN Zhang Jun said that such a visit is provocative and will undermine China-US relations. The US ambassador to Beijing, Nicholas Burns, was summoned by the Chinese Foreign Ministry to protest Pelosi's visit. Chinese ambassador Qin Gang delivered a firm formal complaint and expressed a vigorous objection to the White House National Security Council and the Department of State regarding Pelosi's visit. On August 7, State Councilor and Foreign Minister Wang Yi further accused the US of interfering in China's internal affairs, condoning or tolerating "Taiwan Independence" forces, and deliberately undermining peace across the Taiwan Strait.

In response to Pelosi landing in Taipei, on the night of August 2, the PLA Eastern Theater Command began joint naval and air force exercises in areas north, southwest and southeast of Taiwan; long-distance, live-fire artillery shooting in the Taiwan Strait; and conventional-headed missile test firings in waters east of Taiwan. Taiwan's Ministry of National Defense (MND) reported twenty-one People's Liberation Army (PLA) planes flew into its air defense identification zone (ADIZ) on August 2. The MND reported that 22 PLA aircraft entered its ADIZ crossing the median line of the Taiwan Strait, and an additional five fighters entered the southwestern part of its ADIZ on August 3. In addition, the PRC began large-scale military drills in six areas encircling Taiwan on August 4, which ended on August 11, marking the beginning of the Fourth Taiwan Strait Crisis, China's biggest escalation in 26 years. Taiwan reported 11 Chinese Dongfeng ballistic missiles were fired on August 4, while Japan reported nine ballistic missiles were fired and five of which landed in its exclusive economic zone, southwest of the Yaeyama Islands. According to the Japanese Ministry of Defense, this is the first time ballistic missiles launched by China had landed in Japan's exclusive economic zone and it lodged a diplomatic protest with Beijing in response to the perceived transgression.

The drills caused disruptions to civil aviation and commercial shipping in the region.

The New York Times reported that many netizens in China were upset that government officials had made serious military threats, but did not follow through on them. In response to the criticism, Foreign Ministry spokesperson Hua Chunying later called on citizens to be "rational patriots" and to trust the government. Chinese government officials later worked to temper the public's disappointment, claiming that the government's response was carefully calibrated. In a similar vein, Chinese nationalist Hu Xijin issued a tweet in which he called on the Chinese Air Force to shoot down the plane carrying Pelosi while the Chinese ambassador to France Lu Shaye, speaking on a French TV program, called for the re-education of the Taiwanese population in the hypothetical event that China reunified with Taiwan. Hu's Twitter account was temporarily suspended for violating the platform's commenting rules while Lu's remarks were condemned by American and European officials.

Additional "regular" exercises were announced on August 7, which are scheduled to run in the Yellow and Bohai Sea until August 15 and September 8, respectively. China then announced an early end to the drills on August 10, 2022, but also stated that it would regularly patrol the Taiwan Strait.

While Pelosi was still in Taiwan, Chinese hackers were suspected of hacking electronic screens at a Taiwan Railways Administration (TRA) station and 7-Eleven outlets displaying the message "Warmonger Pelosi get out of Taiwan."

==== Hong Kong ====
Though the Hong Kong Basic Law stipulates that the mainland Chinese government be responsible for foreign affairs, many government officials and organizations in Hong Kong made public statements against Pelosi's visit. The government officials who criticized the visit included Chief Executive John Lee, Chief Secretary Eric Chan, Financial Secretary Paul Chan, and Secretary for Justice Paul Lam. Government departments also released statements against the visit, including the Security Bureau, the Constitutional and Mainland Affairs Bureau, the Innovation, Technology and Industry Bureau, and the Transport and Logistics Bureau. Pro-Beijing political parties who condemned the visit included the Democratic Alliance for the Betterment and Progress of Hong Kong, the Liberal Party, the New People's Party, the Hong Kong Federation of Trade Unions, and the Business and Professionals Alliance.

==== Sanctions ====
On August 1, before Pelosi's visit, China barred shipments from more than 100 Taiwanese food exporters.

China's Ministry of Commerce also imposed economic sanctions on Taiwan (effective from August 3, 2022) by suspending the export of natural materials like sand and the import of Taiwanese products like fruits or fish.

On August 5, the Chinese Foreign Ministry announced sanctions on Pelosi and her immediate family in response to her visit to Taiwan. It is not immediately known what the Chinese sanctions against Pelosi would entail. The ministry also suspended co-operation channels with the US on several fronts, including dialogue between military leaders, criminal-judicial assistance, combating transnational crimes, and climate change talks. On the same day, it lodged representations and protested the Taiwan-related statements made by the G7 foreign ministers and the EU Senior Representative for Foreign Affairs and Security Policy.

=== International ===
Several international governments reacted to the visit and China's military drills.

==== Intergovernmental organizations ====
- ASEAN – In a meeting of 27 countries including the United States, ASEAN warned the tensions could lead to "open conflicts and unpredictable consequences", and called for maximum restraint.
- European Union – An EU spokesperson emphasized the bloc's "clear One China Policy" while engaging in "friendly relations and close cooperation with Taiwan". On August 4, the EU's foreign policy representative released a joint statement issued by the G7 which condemned China's reaction to Pelosi's visit. The European Parliament adopted a resolution on September 15, condemning the Chinese military exercises in the Taiwan Strait.
- G7 – The group issued a joint statement which described China's drills and economic sanctions against Taiwan as unnecessary, escalatory and threatening. It said China's reaction risked destabilizing the region and was disproportionate to the normal and routine practice of legislators from G7 countries traveling internationally. They also said that "There is no change in the respective one China policies, where applicable, and basic positions on Taiwan of the G7 members."

==== Nations ====
- Australia – Prime Minister Anthony Albanese said, "We don't want to see any unilateral change to the status quo." Australia issued a joint statement with the U.S. and Japan urging China to immediately cease its military exercises.
- Belarus – Belarusian Ministry of Foreign Affairs condemned the tensions as "provoked" by the U.S. due to the visit, and said it shares China's concerns "regarding Washington's destructive actions aimed at interfering in China's internal affairs and escalating the situation".
- Canada – Defence minister Anita Anand said China's live-fire exercises has been an "unnecessary escalation," and that there is no justification to use a visit as a pretext for aggressive military activity in the Taiwan Strait.
- France – Foreign Minister Catherine Colonna said China should not use Pelosi's visit as a pretext for the adoption of measures capable of fomenting tensions.
- Germany – Foreign Minister Annalena Baerbock said, "We do not accept when international law is broken and a larger neighbor invades its smaller neighbor in violation of international law — and of course, that also applies to China."
- India – Ministry of Foreign Affairs of India spokesperson Arindam Bagchi said, "Like many other countries, India too is concerned at recent developments. We urge the exercise of restraint, avoidance of unilateral actions to change status quo, de-escalation of tensions and efforts to maintain peace and stability in the region."
- Iran – Nasser Kanaani, the Iranian Foreign Ministry spokesperson, criticised Pelosi's visit and reiterated Iran's support for a "One China" policy.
- Japan – After a meeting with Pelosi, Prime Minister Fumio Kishida described China's missile launches as "a serious problem for our country's security and the safety of our people" and that "China's actions on this occasion have a serious effect on the peace and security of the region and the international community, and we urged an immediate halt to the military exercises." He added that the US and Japan would work together to maintain peace and stability in the Taiwan Strait.
- Laos – The Lao Ministry of Foreign Affairs said that it is "concerned over the development in the Taiwan strait, including a provocative action, which may lead to a tension in the region" and called Taiwan "an inalienable part of China", continuing by saying Laos "opposes any intention aiming at creating a situation for ''two China' or 'one China, one Taiwan'".
- Lithuania – Foreign Minister Gabrielius Landsbergis praised the visit through Twitter, "Speaker Pelosi has opened the door to Taiwan much wider, I am sure other defenders of freedom and democracy will be walking through very soon."
- Myanmar – Ministry of Foreign Affairs of Myanmar stated that the country "opposes any provocative actions causing instabilities in the region and attempts that aim to interfere in the internal affairs of other states" and "fully supports the “One China Policy” and reaffirms that Taiwan is an integral part of the People's Republic of China".
- New Zealand – Prime Minister Jacinda Ardern said, "Dialogue and diplomacy is what we need in these tense times."
- North Korea – The state news agency KCNA criticised what it called US "imprudent interference" in China's internal affairs. A North Korean foreign ministry spokesperson said they "vehemently denounce" any external force's interference in the issue of Taiwan and "fully support" China.
- Pakistan – The Pakistani Foreign Office said that "Pakistan is deeply concerned over the evolving situation in the Taiwan Strait, which has serious implications for regional peace and stability," and that it "stands by" the One-China principle.
- Philippines – The Department of Foreign Affairs on August 4 issued a statement for all parties concerned to exercise restraint, urged for dialogue. It also reiterated the country's continued observance of the One-China policy two days after Chinese Ambassador to Manila Huang Xilian appealed to the Philippines to strictly abide to the policy. Aquilino Pimentel III and Risa Hontiveros of the Senate criticized Huang for dictating the country's foreign policy. In a meeting with United States Secretary of State Antony Blinken and Bongbong Marcos in Manila, Blinken assured the United States' commitment to the Mutual Defense Treaty with the Philippines amidst the tensions.
- Russia – Russia called the visit a "clear provocation, which is in line with the United States' aggressive policy aimed at comprehensively containing China". The government added that Beijing "has the right to take measures to defend its sovereignty and territorial integrity in relation to the Taiwan issue".
- Singapore – A statement released by the Ministry of Foreign Affairs after a meeting between Singapore's Minister for Foreign Affairs Vivian Balakrishnan and China's Foreign Minister Wang Yi stated: "Singapore has a clear and consistent 'one China' policy and is opposed to Taiwan independence and any unilateral moves to change the status quo".
- South Korea – An official from the South Korean presidential office said, "Our government's stance is to maintain close communication with relevant parties ... on the basis that peace and stability in the region through dialogue and cooperation are important". South Korea president Yoon Suk-yeol shunned a meeting with Pelosi when she visited South Korea right after visiting Taiwan, in a bid to placate China.
- United Kingdom – Foreign secretary Liz Truss criticised China's "inflammatory" response to the visit, and said Pelosi's meetings with human rights activists were "perfectly reasonable".
- Vietnam – Foreign ministry spokesperson Le Thi Thu Hang said that "Vietnam wishes for all relevant parties to restrain themselves, not escalate tension in the Taiwan Strait, positively contribute to the maintenance of peace and stability, and strengthen cooperation and development in the region and the world".

== Interpretations and popular response ==
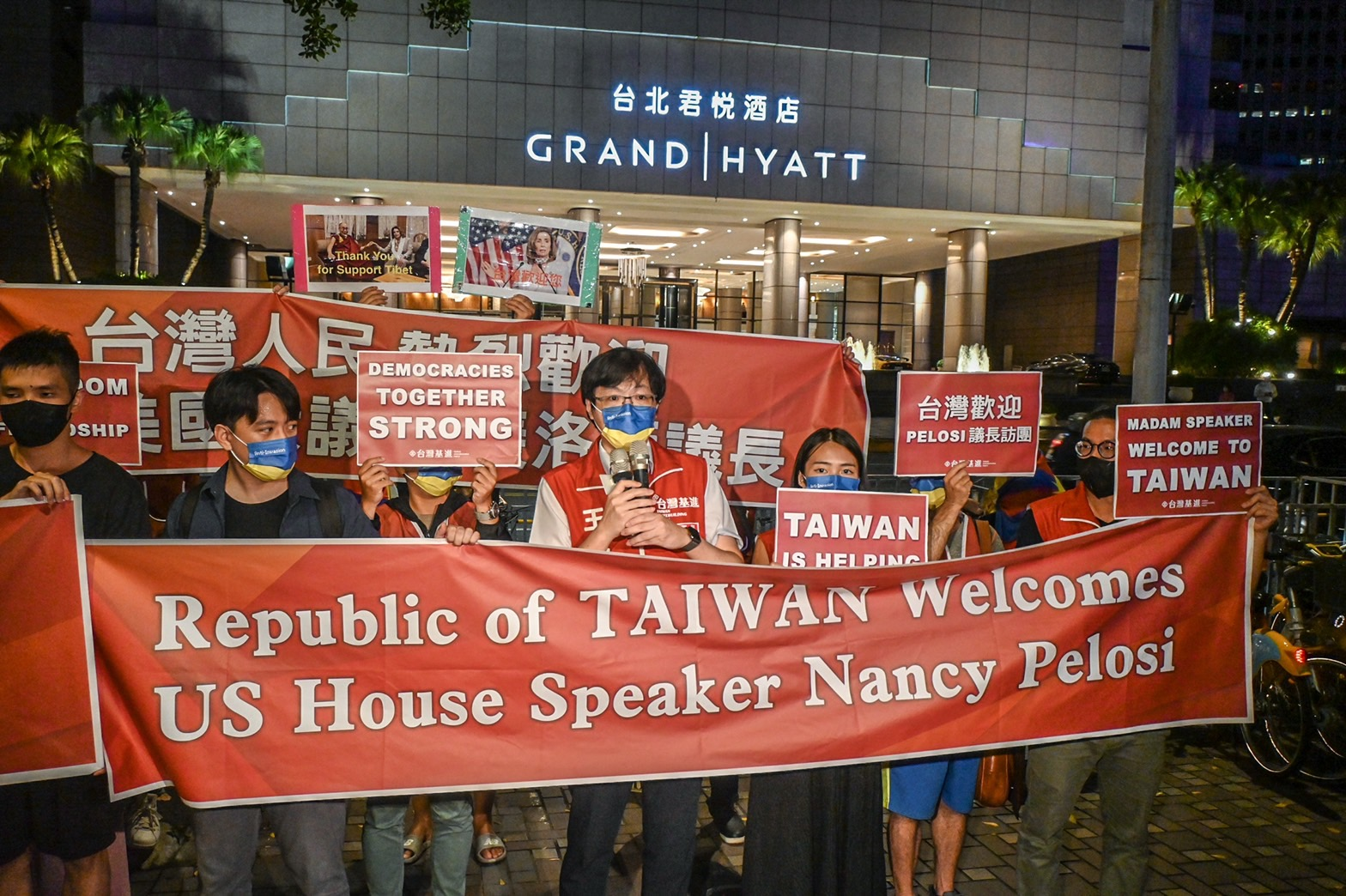
Taiwan Statebuilding Party welcoming the delegation outside Grand Hyatt Taipei

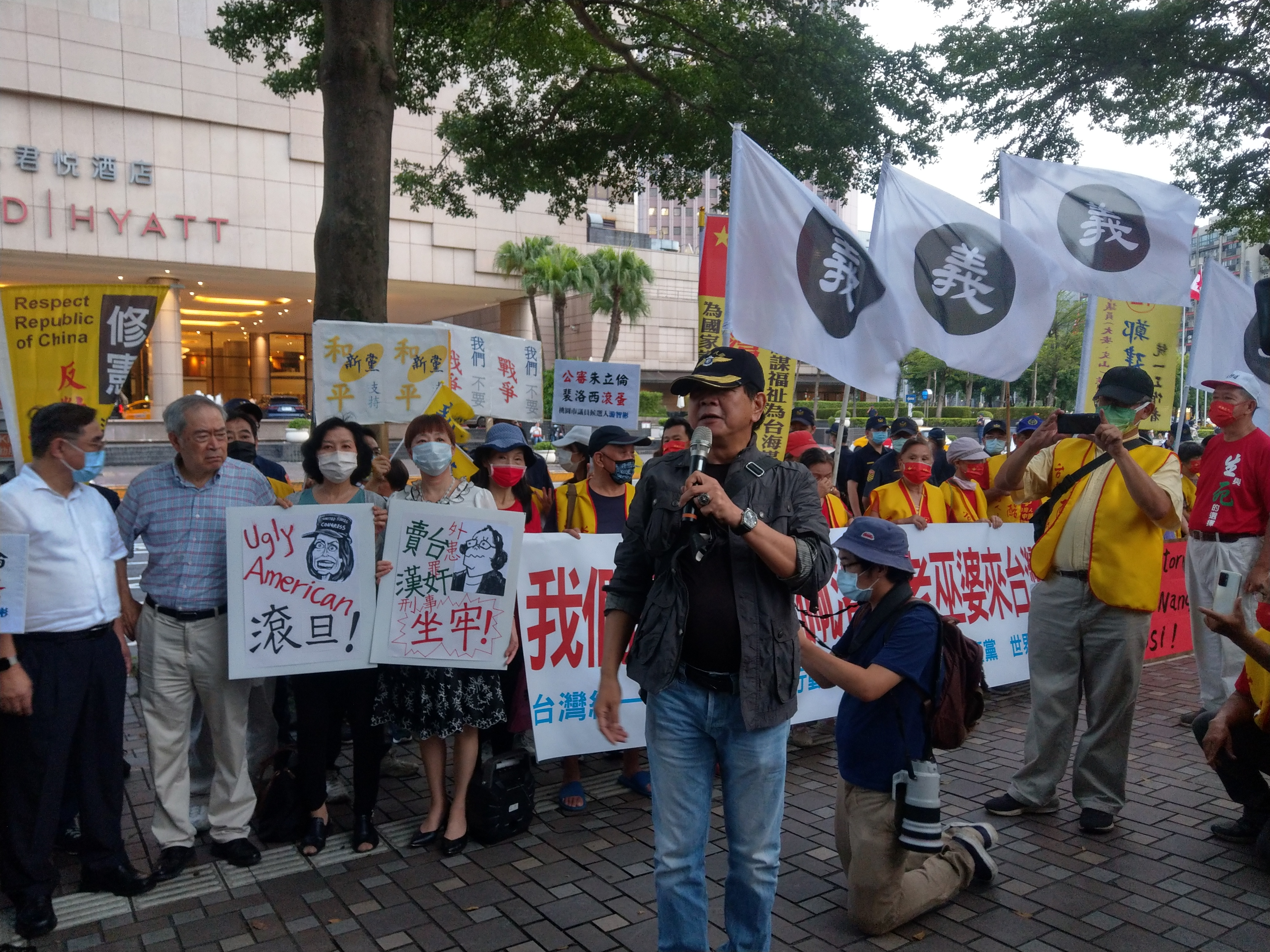
The Patriot Alliance Association protesting opposite the Grand Hyatt Taipei

In an opinion piece written for The New York Times before Pelosi's arrival, Thomas Friedman referred to the trip as "reckless", writing that "Nothing good will come of it". Two op-eds also published by The New York Times took the opposing view: Bret Stephens praised Pelosi's decision to follow through with her trip despite the risks it carried, while Yu-Jie Chen, a professor at Academia Sinica, welcomed the visit as a valuable expression of solidarity in light of Taiwan's rising tensions with China. Writing for Intelligencer, Ross Barkan expressed sentiments similar to those in Friedman's op-ed, stating that there was "nothing immediately tangible that Pelosi can accomplish by going to Taiwan". An article in Foreign Policy by historian A. A Bastian said that the disinformation and cyberattacks connected to Pelosi's visit were part of a long-running campaign of information warfare that China has been conducting against Taiwan. In an interview with Isaac Chotiner, published by The New Yorker, Davidson College professor Shelley Rigger said that despite the initial intention to deliver symbolic support to Taiwan, the ensuing political brinkmanship between the United States and China meant that Taiwan's interests and concerns were sidelined.

The plane carrying the delegation, dubbed "SPAR19", was the most tracked aircraft on FlightRadar24 during its flight to Taiwan. Bloomberg reported some 300,000 users of the site tracked the flight, a number that FlightRadar24 reported grew as high as 708,000 as the plane approached Taipei and landed. A cumulative 2.92 million people used the site to observe the flight. The plane took a detour to avoid flying over the airspace above the contested South China Sea, which is claimed by China.

When interviewed by The New York Times, Pelosi's constituents in the Chinatown neighborhood of San Francisco expressed "anger and apprehension" over the visit and concerns that the visit might exacerbate xenophobia and racism against Chinese-Americans related to the COVID-19 pandemic. Jonathan Lee, an academic at San Francisco State University, said that Pelosi's trip was unlikely to damage her high political standing amongst her Chinese American constituents as their concerns have primarily been focused on domestic issues and the voting bloc as a whole has leaned towards the Democratic Party. Taiwanese Americans in the Bay Area, also interviewed by The New York Times, were supportive of the visit.

The potential of a visit initially received little attention from Taiwan's domestic media, which prioritized other news including a local heatwave and local elections. Attention in Taiwan increased after the visit was confirmed, roughly 48 hours before the visit took place.

Analysis by international studies and political science scholars Yao-Yuan Yeh, Fang-Yu Chen, Austin Horng-En Wang, and Charles K.S. Wu concluded that high-level visits by foreign officials can be an important way for a stronger member of an alliance to reassure the smaller partners about the alliance's strength. Yeh et al. noted that preceding survey research found that a visit by a group of U.S. senators in June 2021 "significantly increased" the confidence of Taiwanese respondents in the Taiwanese military, and that "the effects hold across different political groups, which suggests the impact of the visit by the U.S. senators wasn't the result of partisanship or nationalism within the survey sample." Based on these and other findings, Yeh et al. suggested that the Pelosi visit "would probably significantly reassure the people of Taiwan, enhancing public support on the island for military and defense spending as well as U.S. strategic policy goals."

Most Taiwanese welcomed Pelosi's visit as a sign of U.S. support in the face of persistent threats from China. Taiwan's tallest building, Taipei 101, displayed the messages "Welcome to Taiwan, Speaker Pelosi" and "Thank you, friend of democracy" in Mandarin and English during the visit. A small group of supporters, including representatives of the Democratic Progressive Party, greeted Pelosi upon her arrival. There were some dissenting voices within Taiwan, including some Taiwanese who favor unification with China. In a poll of 7,500 readers of the pan-Blue coalition supporting United Daily News, 61% thought the visit was "not welcome" as it "may destabilize the Taiwan Strait".

The founder of Taiwan-based semiconductor company United Microelectronics Corporation, Robert Tsao pledged one hundred million US dollars to Taiwan's Ministry of National Defense in the interest of "safeguarding freedom, democracy, and human rights." The pledge came as a response to Chinese military aggression following the visit to Taiwan.

An article in Bloomberg said that Pelosi's visit hindered Biden's attempt to create a united front against China involving America's Asian allies and security partners Opinion pieces in the Diplomat and Brookings took the opposite view, arguing that Pelosi's visit helped with alliance building efforts for Taiwan. Former senior CIA analysts Chris Johnson and John Culver believed Chinese actions are orchestrated to have both aggressions and constraints. The military exercises were aimed to set an expectation for Taiwan, the United States Congress, and China's internal populace on the potential future responses in relation to Taiwan independence movement, unification, and One-China policy.

A year after the visit, The Washington Post columnist David Ignatius assessed that the visit had "done considerable damage to the island’s security", and that President Biden should have blocked the visit. Matthew Fulco of the Japan Times argues that the visit led to increasing Chinese military activities around Taiwan, which gave China justification for escalation, eroded island's defense posture and increased risk of conflict.

== Aftermath ==
In mid-August 2022, the U.S. announced formal trade negotiations with Taiwan. On June 1, 2023, the U.S. and Taiwan signed the first agreement under the U.S.-Taiwan Initiative on 21st Century Trade which was launched in June 2022.

At the ASEAN Foreign Ministers' Meetings in August 2022, ASEAN and individual member states of ASEAN reiterated their support of the One China policy.

After Pelosi's visit, China began to expand its military presence in the area, using the visit as justification to establish a new status quo in the Taiwan Strait. Taiwanese Foreign Minister Joseph Wu denounced Chinese military exercises a "serious provocation", while Chinese Foreign Ministry spokesman Wang Wenbin called China's military response to the Pelosi's visit as "justified" to protect territorial integrity.

On April 5, 2023, President Tsai Ing-wen met with then US House of Representatives Speaker Kevin McCarthy and a bipartisan group of Congressional leaders at the Ronald Reagan Presidential Library in Simi Valley, California, followed by a joint press conference.

Jake Sullivan, who served as the National Security Advisor under the Biden administration from 2021 to 2025, commented on a podcast interview in November 2025 that "the cost to Taiwan of that visit far exceeded the benefit to Taiwan of that visit" because it led to "substantive changes in Taiwan's immediate environment to the negative; on the positive side, kind of some symbolism".

== See also ==
- Chinese military exercises around Taiwan
  - 2022 Chinese military exercises around Taiwan
  - 2023 Chinese military exercises around Taiwan
  - Joint Sword-2024A and 2024B
  - Strait Thunder-2025A and Justice Mission 2025
- Taiwan Strait Crises
  - First Taiwan Strait Crisis
  - Second Taiwan Strait Crisis
  - Third Taiwan Strait Crisis
- Chinese Civil War
- China–United States relations
- Cross-Strait relations
- Foreign relations of China
- Foreign relations of Taiwan
- Foreign relations of the United States
- History of China
- History of Taiwan
- One China
- Political status of Taiwan
- Taiwan–United States relations
