= Ned Price =

American diplomat and political advisor (born 1982)

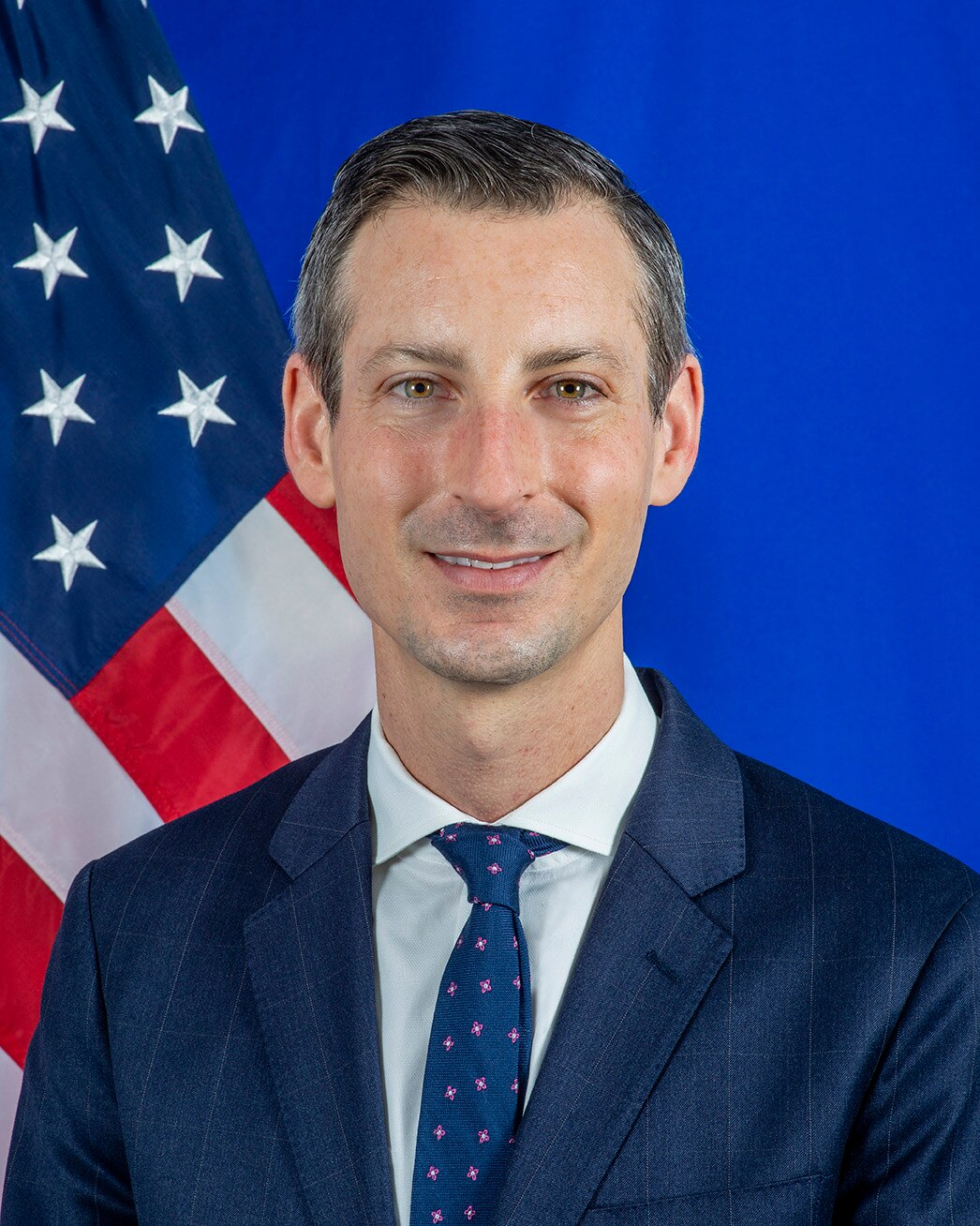
- Official portrait, 2021

Deputy to the United States Ambassador to the United Nations
- In office February 29, 2024 – January 20, 2025
- President: Joe Biden
- Preceded by: Jeffrey Prescott
- Succeeded by: TBC

29th Spokesman for the United States Department of State
- In office January 20, 2021 – March 17, 2023
- President: Joe Biden
- Deputy: Jalina Porter; Vedant Patel
- Preceded by: Morgan Ortagus
- Succeeded by: Matthew Miller

Personal details
- Born: November 22, 1982 (age 43)
- Education: Georgetown University (BS); Harvard University (MPA)

Edward "Ned" Price (born November 22, 1982) is an American diplomat, political advisor and former intelligence officer who served as the deputy to the United States Ambassador to the United Nations from 2024 to 2025.^{[†]} In this role, he was considered a Deputy Cabinet Secretary and a sitting member of the National Security Council's Deputies Committee. He previously served as Senior Advisor to the Secretary of State from 2023 to 2024 and the Spokesperson for the United States Department of State from 2021 to 2023. He worked at the Central Intelligence Agency (CIA) from 2006 until 2017.

In February 2017, Price published a controversial op-ed piece in The Washington Post, outlining his decision to retire from the CIA rather than work in the Trump administration.

== Early life and education ==
Price grew up in Dallas, where he graduated from St. Mark's School of Texas, the son of a Christian mother and a Jewish father. He was inducted into the Cum Laude society, and served as editor of The Marksmen, the school's yearbook, as well as a contributing member of The ReMarker. He then graduated summa cum laude from Georgetown University, where he studied international relations at the School of Foreign Service, which named him the class Salutatorian. He chose this university and field of study in anticipation of joining the CIA after graduation. He later earned a master's degree from Harvard University's Kennedy School of Government, where he was a Public Service Fellow and earned a citation for a superior master's thesis.

== Career ==
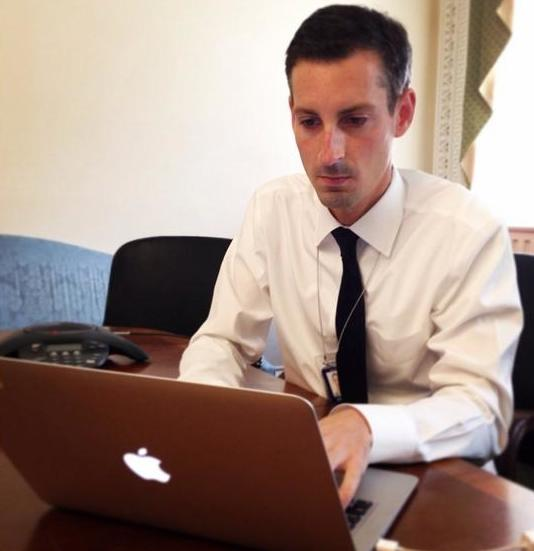
Price live blogging at the White House in 2014

Early in his career, Price worked as an intelligence analyst at the CIA. His focus was on the detection and disruption of possible terrorist attacks against the United States and its interests. In 2013, Mother Jones quoted Price defending the CIA financing research on climate change, in the face of opposition from Republican lawmakers who had described the CIA unit as "a waste of resources" and "spying on sea lions". Later in his CIA career, he was loaned to the National Security Council, serving as its spokesperson and as a Special Assistant to President Barack Obama. Price discusses his experiences working under President Obama in West Wingers: Stories from the Dream Chasers, Change Makers, and Hope Creators Inside the Obama White House (2018).

Price is a co-founder and previously served as Director of Policy and Communications at National Security Action, a 501(c)(4) registered lobby group along with several former Obama national security advisors.

=== Op-ed piece ===
In a February 2017 Washington Post op-ed piece, Price described mounting concerns over Donald Trump, first when he was candidate, then prior to inauguration, and then as the sitting president. Price described his initial concern when Trump blithely dismissed the opinions of senior intelligence officials during a debate with rival candidate Hillary Clinton. Price then described how demoralized he and fellow CIA officials felt when newly inaugurated President Trump used a visit to CIA headquarters for campaign-style self-promotion. Finally, Price reflected on how Trump removed senior intelligence officials from the "principal's committee", and expressed concern that by ignoring their advice he was putting public safety at risk.

In his op-ed, Price had pointed out that he had loyally served in both Republican and Democratic administrations.

=== Concerns related to Jared Kushner ===
In an article published in Politico on July 14, 2017, Price expressed concerns related to the appointment and continued hold of a security clearance of President Trump's son-in-law Jared Kushner. In the article, Price reviewed the extensive vetting that he had experienced to gain a security clearance, which lasted approximately a year, and compared that to the security clearance granted to Kushner. Discussing the disclosures of the developing information related to Kushner's apparent involvement in a Russian interference in the 2016 United States presidential election, Price said: "I am confident in saying that my clearance would have been immediately revoked had I, as a career CIA officer, been accused of a fraction of these activities."

=== Biden administration ===
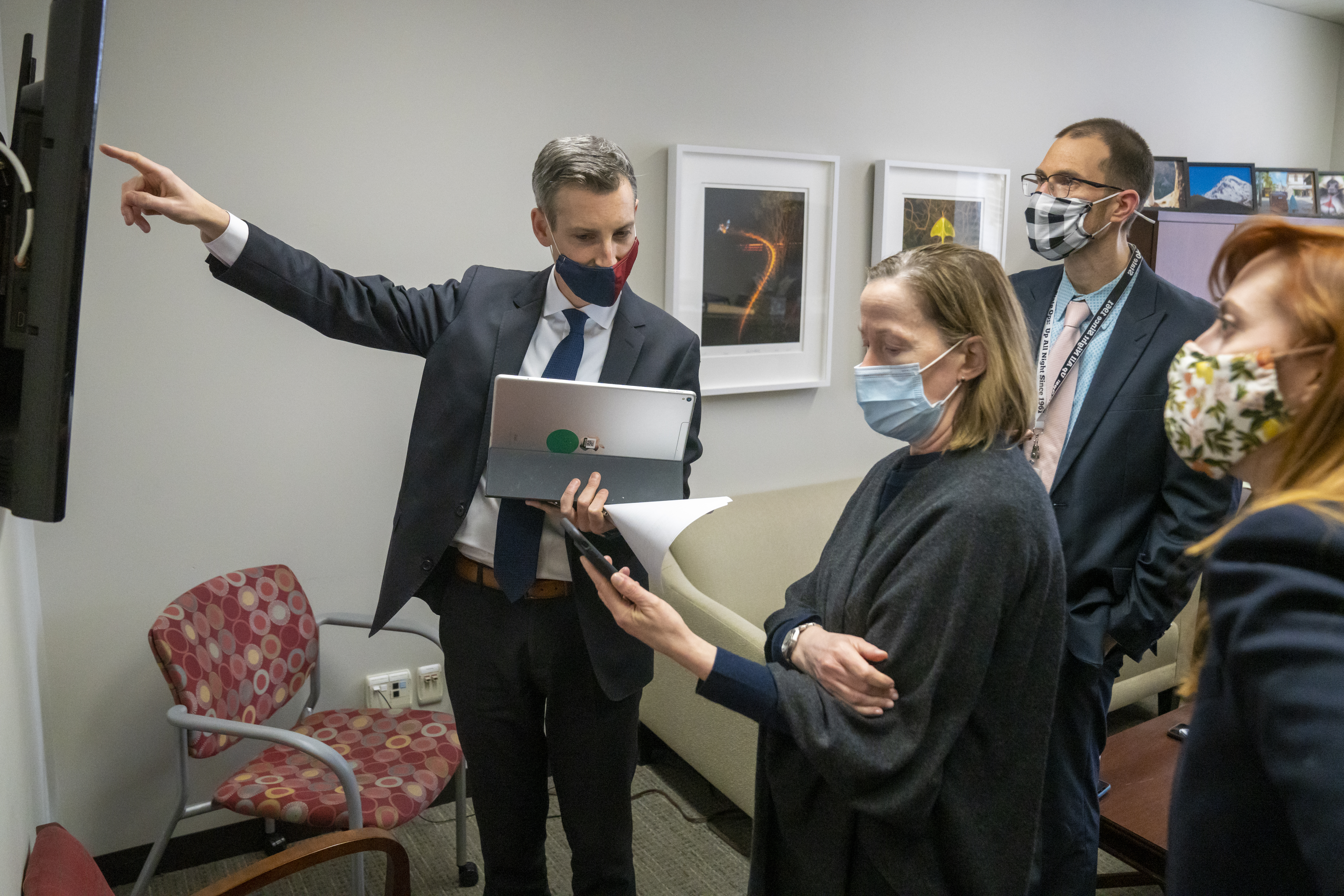
Ned Price in February 2021

On January 20, 2021, Price assumed office as the Spokesperson for the United States Department of State in the Biden administration; he was the first openly gay person in this post. In addition to his role as Spokesperson, he was widely seen as one of Secretary of State Blinken's closest and most trusted advisors.

In March 2021, Price stated that the U.S. has "serious concerns" about the International Criminal Court's (ICC) investigation into war crimes committed during the 2014 War in Gaza. Price stated that the ICC has "no jurisdiction over this matter" and is "unfairly" targeting Israel; his statement is consistent with Trump's executive order 13928, which denies the jurisdiction of ICC over the United States and its allies.

Price also raised concerns when he used the "America First" trope of Donald Trump to justify ban on vaccine raw materials to India.

On February 6, 2022, Price engaged in a heated exchange with Associated Press (AP) reporter Matt Lee over the Biden administration's claims about Ukraine. In the exchange, which was widely circulated, Price said that Russia was planning to stage an attack as a pretext for war; he provided no evidence to support the assertion, despite multiple questions from the AP reporter. On February 24, 2022, Russia invaded Ukraine after a series of attempted pretexts.

In December 2022, Ned Price said that Azerbaijan's blockade of Nagorno-Karabakh has serious humanitarian consequences and called on Azerbaijan to restore free movement through the Lachin corridor.

Price stepped down as Department Spokesperson on March 17, 2023, and shortly thereafter took up his role as Senior Advisor to Secretary of State Blinken. He oversaw implementation of Blinken's key priorities and frequently accompanied him on his travels around the world.

In February 2024, he was appointed by President Biden to serve as the Deputy to the U.S. Representative to the United Nations, Linda Thomas-Greenfield. In addition to managing day-to-day diplomacy, he served as a standing member of the NSC's Deputies Committee and regularly represented the U.S. Mission during meetings of the Principals Committee chaired by President Biden. He held the position for the remainder of Biden's term in office.

=== Subsequent career ===
Price served as a Residential Fellow for the Institute of Politics at the Harvard Kennedy School for the Fall 2025 semester. In December 2025, following the sudden death of the institute's director, Setti Warren, Price began serving as the interim co-director of the Institute of Politics alongside Beth Myers while the school conducts a search for a permanent IOP director. Price serves as the primary leader of the Institute, with Myers serving in a part-time capacity.

Price is a Member of the Council on Foreign Relations and serves on fiduciary and advisory boards for several non-profit organizations, including Foreign Policy for America.

== Publications ==
=== Articles ===
- Price, Ned (October 20, 2025). "I worked for Biden. Here's the gold in Trump's foreign policy". The Washington Post. Archived from the original on October 21, 2025.
- “Hegseth’s Pentagon Plan Will Hurt Our National Security,” The New York Times, September 30, 2025.
- “How Putin Tricked Trump,” Foreign Policy, August 13, 2025.
- "Americans Should Beware of Gabbard's Dangerous Distraction," Fox News, July 23, 2025.
- "Israel Should Have Let Diplomacy Run Its Course," Foreign Policy, June 16, 2025.
- Praise for the Suleimani Strike Isn’t Based in Reality, Foreign Policy, January 13, 2020 (co-authored with Jeffrey Prescott)
- “Don’t Muzzle Former C.I.A. Officers,” The New York Times, November 13, 2017 (with Cindy Otis and John Sipher).
- “Why Mike Pompeo Released More bin Laden Files,” The Atlantic, November 8, 2017.
- "I Didn't Think I'd Ever Leave the CIA. Because of Trump, I Quit," The Washington Post, February 20, 2017.

== Personal life ==
Price is openly gay and identifies as Jewish, though he rarely attends synagogue.

== Footnotes ==
^{†} N.b. the appointed role of Deputy to the Ambassador to the UN is a separate position from the Senate-confirmed role of Deputy Ambassador to the United Nations. The Deputy to the Ambassador assists the U.S. Ambassador to the UN by acting as a liaison in Washington, D.C., managing their Washington office, interacting with Congress and acting as a stand-in for the UN ambassador. The two roles co-exist, as in 2019 when Taryn Frideres was Deputy to the Ambassador at the same time that Jonathan Cohen was Deputy Ambassador to the UN.

Political offices
Preceded by Morgan Ortagus	Spokesperson for the United States Department of State; 2021–2023	Succeeded by Matthew Miller
