= Joint Sword =

Joint Sword is the name given by the People's Liberation Army to three military exercises it conducted during the Fourth Taiwan Strait Crisis.

- Joint Sword (2023) from 8–10 April 2023
- Joint Sword-2024A from 23–24 May 2024
- Joint Sword-2024B from 14–15 October 2024
