= Tucker Eskew =

American businessman

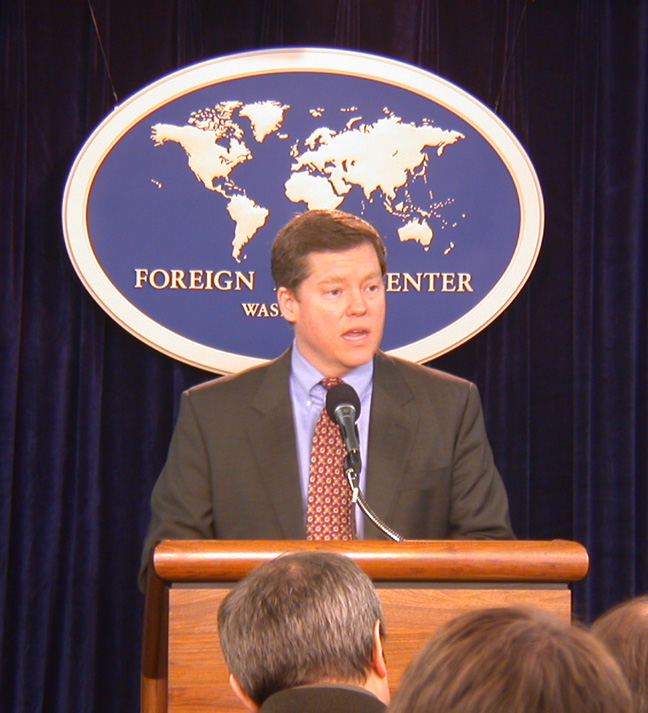
- Citizenship: American
- Education: The University of the South
- Occupations: Business and communications consultant
- Years active: 1984-present
- Organization: Vianovo
- Political party: Republican
- Spouse: Lisa Lackovic Eskew

Tucker Eskew is a political and communications strategist in the United States who served as Deputy Assistant to the President for Media Affairs and Global Communications under President George W. Bush. He joined Senator John McCain's presidential campaign in August 2008 as senior advisor and counselor to Sarah Palin. He was the founder of Eskew Strategy Group, an Alexandria-based communications firm. In 2005, he merged the Eskew Group into a new bipartisan communications firm called Vianovo.

== Early life and career ==
Eskew is a native of South Carolina. He graduated with a degree in Political Science from The University of the South in 1983. He began his political career in 1984 analyzing campaign press coverage for the Reagan-Bush committee. In 1987, Eskew became a press secretary to South Carolina Governor Carroll Campbell at age 25. He served Campbell as press secretary and communications director until 1995.

In the mid-1990s, he co-founded an electronic commerce business and later started a South Carolina-based public relations and business-consulting firm.

== 2000 George W. Bush Presidential campaign ==
Eskew served as communications director to George W. Bush during the 2000 Presidential primaries. Eskew worked as Bush's spokesman and political operative in South Carolina.

A report on the South Carolina Republican primary in The New York Times described him as "Mr. Bush's spokesman here and a longtime political operative," quoting his pushback against crossover voters: "I think this alliance between the limousine-liberal Democrats and the McCain campaign is distorting the intent of real Republican voters."

According to ABC News, "When the media first reported push-poll phone calls from Voter/Consumer Research, a company hired by the Bush campaign, asking South Carolinians if they knew about McCain's role in the S&L crisis and his scandal as a member of the Keating Five, it was Eskew -- Bush's South Carolina spokesman – who acknowledged, and defended, the calls."

After the Bush upset victory over McCain in South Carolina, Eskew became a top advisor to the Bush national campaign. In Austin, Texas at the national campaign headquarters, Eskew was part of the team that overhauled Bush's campaign website, adding new features and altering the overall layout. He served as spokesman for the Bush campaign during the 2000 Palm Beach popular vote recount.

== George W. Bush administration ==
After Bush took office in January, 2001, Eskew became the director of Bush's Office of Media Affairs at the White House, reporting to media chief Karen Hughes. In this position, Eskew directed the administration's strategy for regional American news and specialty media, including talk radio. He also oversaw Bush's website. In November 2001, Eskew was moved to 10 Downing Street and the Foreign and Commonwealth Office in London to help plan media strategy in opposition to Osama bin Laden. He co-directed the Coalition Information Centre, a publicity operation based in Washington, London and Islamabad. While in London, Eskew acted as Bush's communications liaison to the Prime Minister's office. He worked with the Blair ministry on the American and British joint media response to the September 11 attacks. Eskew met daily with Blair's Director of Communications and Strategy Alastair Campbell to discuss media strategy in the war on terrorism and the UK government's Islamic Media Unit. He participated in daily calls with global communications offices in Qatar and London and issued the White House's "Global Messenger," a daily email to US embassies. He later worked as Deputy Assistant to the president and Director of the White House Office of Global Communications where he managed American press internationally and oversaw US wartime messaging.

== 2004 George W. Bush presidential campaign ==
Eskew continued to support President Bush as a supersurrogate, or advisor, planning media strategy during the 2004 election. He oversaw campaign communications efforts in battleground states and contributed to the Republican Party platform.

== Vianovo ==
In 2003, Eskew resigned from his position in the Bush administration to launch Eskew Strategy Group alongside his wife, Lisa Lackovic Eskew.

In 2005, Eskew merged Eskew Strategy Group into political consultancy Vianovo, which he co-founded alongside Matthew Dowd, Blaine Bull and James S. Taylor.

== 2008 John McCain presidential campaign ==
In 2008, Eskew was brought on board the McCain campaign to aid vice presidential candidate Sarah Palin in the preparation of speeches and press appearance management. He served as counselor to Palin on the campaign trail. Eskew's work with Palin was portrayed by actor Colby French in the 2012 HBO original film Game Change.

== Other roles ==
Eskew was featured as a political commentator in the documentary Boogie Man: The Lee Atwater Story. In the film, Eskew says "Can you understand American politics if you don't understand Lee Atwater? I believe not."

He serves on the board of directors for the Melanoma Research Foundation, where he is chairman of the Governance Committee. He also serves on the ONE Campaign's National Advisory Committee. Eskew traveled to Ghana in 2011 on a bipartisan "listening and learning" trip led by the ONE Campaign.
