= Joint Sword (2023) =

2023 Chinese combat patrols of Taiwan

- Part of the Fourth Taiwan Strait Crisis
- Location: Northwest Pacific Ocean: Taiwan Strait; East China Sea; Philippine Sea; Luzon Strait; South China Sea
- Planned by: China
- Commanded by: Xi Jinping
- Objective: Retaliate against Taiwanese president Tsai Ing-wen's visit to the United States; Test capabilities of seizing control of the sea, air and information under the support of the joint combat system
- Date: 8–10 April 2023 (2 days)
- Executed by: People's Liberation Army; Eastern Theater Command
- Outcome: Continuation of the Fourth Taiwan Strait Crisis

The 2023 Chinese military exercises around Taiwan (simplified Chinese: 2023年环台军事演练; traditional Chinese: 2023年環台軍事演練) were a series of military exercises by the People's Liberation Army (PLA) of the People's Republic of China (PRC) encircling Taiwan. On 8 April 2023, the PLA announced the start of "combat readiness patrols" and dispatched dozens of fighter jets and several warships toward Taiwan. The exercises occurred in response to Taiwanese president Tsai Ing-wen's meeting with US Speaker of the House Kevin McCarthy.

On 4 March 2023, McCarthy announced he had planned a meeting with president Tsai, which was scheduled for early April. In response, the PLA made multiple threats toward the Taiwanese government. Tsai arrived in the U.S. on 4 April and met with lawmakers, including McCarthy. In response, four days later the PLA dispatched dozens of aircraft and several warships toward the country's surrounding waters.

== Background ==
=== 2022 military exercises ===
On 2 August 2022, then-US Speaker of the House Nancy Pelosi arrived in Taiwan and met with president Tsai Ing-wen. In response, the People's Liberation Army pursued a series of military exercises encircling Taiwan, including live-fire drills, air sorties, naval deployments, and ballistic missile launches. On 7 August, the Taiwanese government announced that it would be conducting live-fire artillery exercises in Pingtung County. During drills held in Lienchiang County, flares fired by Taiwan's army started a fire. On 10 August, the Eastern Theatre Command announced an end to the military exercises after it had "successfully completed various tasks and effectively tested the integrated combat capabilities of the troops".

=== President Tsai's visit to the U.S. ===
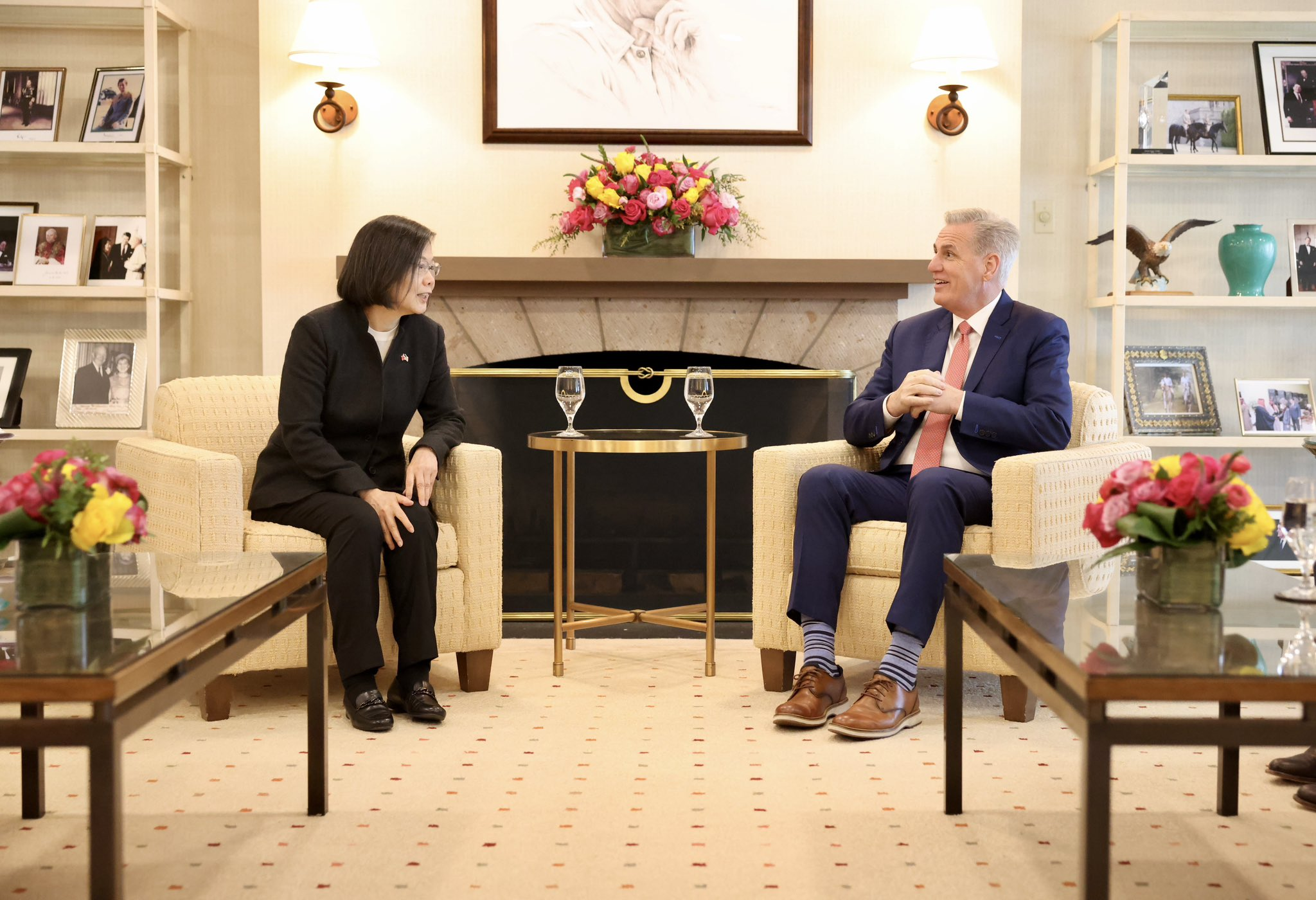
U.S. Speaker McCarthy with Taiwan president Tsai Ing-wen, April 2023

On 4 March 2023, US Speaker of the House Kevin McCarthy announced that he had planned a meeting with Taiwanese president Tsai Ing-wen in the U.S. After his announcement, the PLA threatened to take serious action against Tsai if she met with McCarthy.

Despite the threats, Tsai arrived in the U.S. on 5 April and met with McCarthy and other prominent U.S. lawmakers. The meeting took place at the Ronald Reagan Presidential Library.

Hours after Tsai's meeting, a congressional delegation consisting of Representative Michael McCaul, chair of the Foreign Affairs Committee, arrived in Taipei in their third overseas visit. During their stop, McCaul stated: "we stand here today not as Republicans or Democrats, but as Americans in strong support of Taiwan". He also compared CCP General Secretary Xi Jinping with Adolf Hitler, a remark that sparked controversy. In response, the Chinese Communist Party (CCP) sanctioned McCaul.

== Military exercises ==
On 8 April 2023, the PLA announced the start of three days of "combat readiness patrols" (战备警巡) encircling Taiwan, naming the exercises "Joint Sword" (联合利剑). That same day, Chinese state media released a video which mentioned several of the assets that would be used in the exercises, including PLA army rockets, the Navy's destroyer escort, a missile boat, the Air Force's J-series, fighter bombers, electronic warfare aircraft, and aerial tankers.

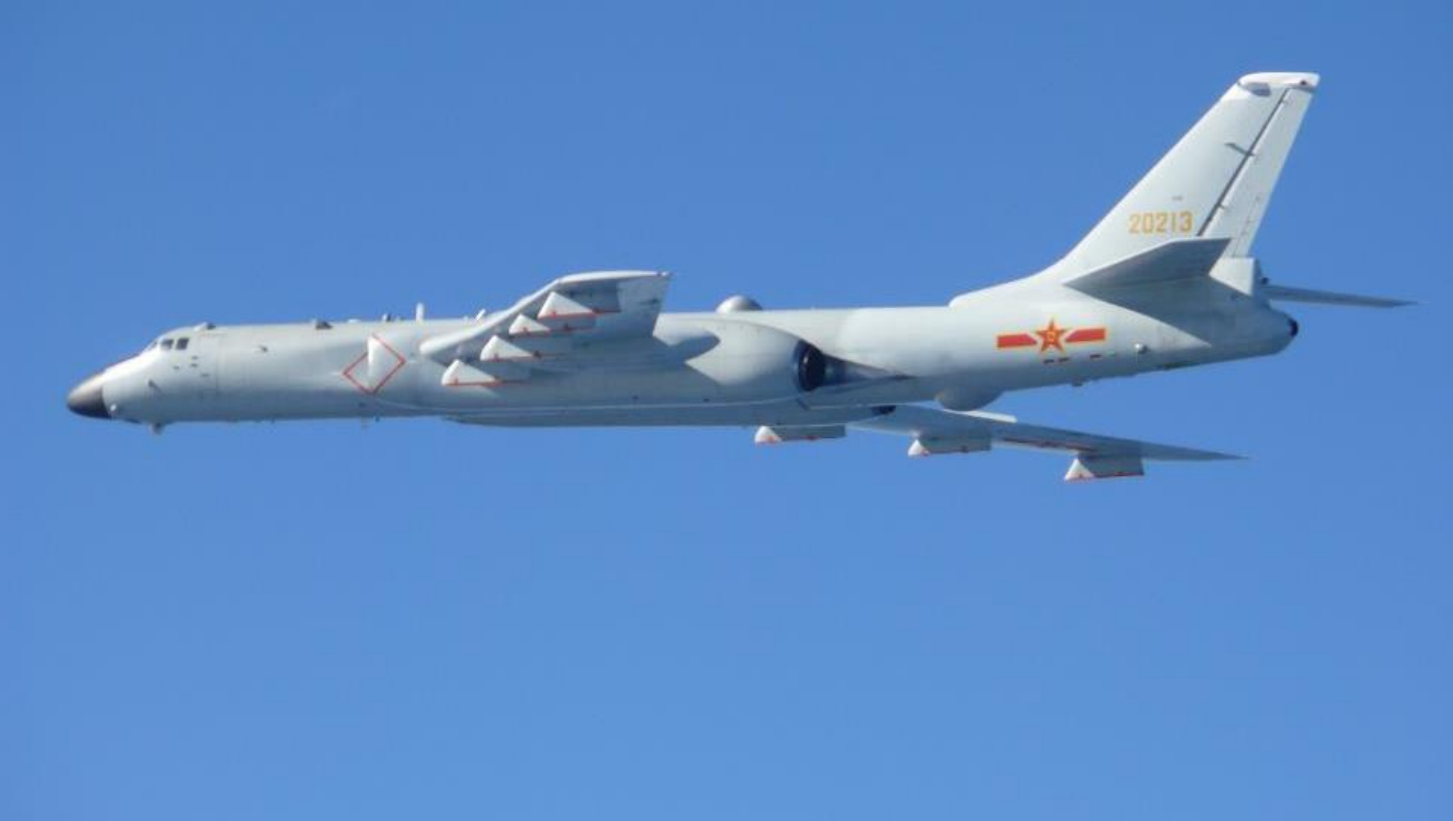
Xian H-6 bombers, one pictured here in 2022, were spotted flying over Taiwan during the exercises

Following the announcement, the military dispatched several warships and dozens of aircraft—including Sukhoi Su-30s and Xian H-6 bombers—toward Taiwan. According to Taiwan's defense ministry, approximately 71 Chinese military aircraft crossed the median line of the Taiwan Strait. The PLA later announced a live-fire exercise on waters near Pingtan Island. Taiwan released a map of the flight paths of four Chinese J-15 fighter jets to the east of the island, which analysts stated were likely from the Shandong aircraft carrier which was participating in the military exercises.

On 9 April 2023, Chinese fighter jets and war ships simulated strikes on Taiwan and simulated an encirclement of the island, prompting Taiwan to deploy its own warships, leading to a standoff between the two navies.

In response, on 10 April the U.S. Navy sent one warship to the South China Sea. That same day, China announced the end of the initial drills, but stated they would continue combat training around Taiwan.

== Reactions ==
Russian government spokesman Dmitry Peskov stated in an audio post to Telegram that China had the "right to respond" against the "provocative actions" against it.

The European Union (EU) expressed concern about the "intensification" of military activity around Taiwan, stating that the status quo should not be changed unilaterally, or by force, and urged restraint.

== See also ==
- Cross-Strait relations
