= Vianovo =

- Type: Private
- Industry: Management consulting Communications; Advocacy; Public relations
- Founded: 2005
- Headquarters: United States; Mexico
- Number of locations: 4 (2014)
- Key people: Matthew Miller (partner); Tucker Eskew (partner)
- Services: Strategic planning Crisis communications Issue campaigns Coalition building Grassroots mobilization Opinion research Market entry
- Website: www.vianovo.com

Vianovo is a United States and Mexico-based management and communication consultancy. The firm advises corporations, startups and non-profit organizations on brand, policy and crisis issues. The bipartisan firm was founded in 2005 by political strategists Blaine Bull, Matthew Dowd, Tucker Eskew and James Taylor. Many of the firm's partners were previously senior staff members on presidential campaigns, at the White House, and on Capitol Hill.

== Company overview ==
Vianovo is a management, advocacy and communication consultancy with offices in Austin, Dallas-Fort Worth, Washington, D.C. and Mexico City. The firm's services include opinion research, strategic planning, public campaigns, issue advocacy, public relations, coalition building, crisis management and cross-border expansion. Vianovo serves as an advisor to corporations, startups and non-profit organizations.

Notable clients have included AT&T, the Bill & Melinda Gates Foundation, the NBA, Malaria No More, Valeant Pharmaceuticals, and Bears for Leadership Reform. The firm also has an investment group, Vianovo Ventures, which partners with and supports startups.

Vianovo is led by eight partners: Blaine Bull, Tucker Eskew, Matthew Miller, Billy Moore, Katherine Nash Goehring, Robert Norcross, Michael Shannon and James Taylor. Other key Vianovo staff members include vice presidents Julie Hillrichs, Elizabeth Lippincott, Cesar Martinez, Lori McClure and senior advisor M.C. Andrews.

== Company history ==
Vianovo was established as a bipartisan firm in May 2005 by political strategists Bull, Dowd, Eskew and Taylor. The firm merged the founders' four agencies: Eskew Strategy Group, Dowd Strategic Consulting, StratCom Group, and CIMA Strategies.

Previous to their work at Vianovo, Dowd and Eskew held senior positions on the presidential campaigns of former president George W. Bush, and Eskew served as head of media affairs in the White House. Bull, Dowd, Moore, and Taylor worked for Senator Lloyd Bentsen in Congress.

In 2005, the company employed a new proprietary process called AIMD, which stands for Audience, Insight, Message and Delivery. Vianovo uses the process to plan and implement targeted communication. In 2006, partners William "Billy" Moore, Michael Shannon and Robert Norcross joined Vianovo. Moore was a veteran of over 50 political campaigns. Shannon came to Vianovo from the Boston Consulting Group and had previously been a strategist on the 2004 George W. Bush presidential campaign. That same year, Norcross opened a new Vianovo office in Dallas-Fort Worth. Former U.S. Ambassador to Mexico Antonio "Tony" Garza joined Vianovo as a partner in June 2009. As of 2013, Garza is chairman of Vianovo Ventures, Vianovo’s investment arm, which partners with and funds startups.

Matthew Miller joined Vianovo as a partner in 2011 after leaving his role at the United States Department of Justice, where he served as Attorney General Eric Holder's spokesperson. In March 2014, the firm formed Mexico Energy Strategic Advisory (MESA), an advisory board that offers U.S. companies and investors information, strategic advice and policy analysis on the Mexico energy market.

Founding partner Matthew Dowd left Vianovo in 2015 to launch Paradox Capital, a social impact venture fund. Katherine Nash Goehring became a partner in 2015. Prior to that, Goehring led communications and investor relations for Martha Stewart Living Omnimedia. Matthew Miller, who had departed the firm to work in the State Department of the Biden Administration, returned as a partner in 2025.

== Notable projects ==
Vianovo was hired by the National Basketball Association to help the league find a new demographic of fans in 2005. The firm conducted focus groups and consulted with NBA Commissioner David Stern. Stern implemented a controversial dress code for players later that year, banning baggy jeans, gold chains and large white T-shirts while players represented the league in an official capacity.

In December 2006, Vianovo handled media relations and communications for the White House-backed non-profit organization Malaria No More. That same year, the firm developed a marketing campaign using a political model for AT&T’s launch of U-verse, the company's bundle of fiber-optic services. AT&T and Vianovo held promotional neighborhood block parties, a tactic used by partner Dowd during the 2004 Bush campaign.

In 2008, Vianovo partnered with Convio for a National Press Club panel discussion called “Converging Campaigns: How the Internet is changing philanthropy, advocacy and politics”. The talk featured strategists and executives from Facebook, Rock the Vote, the American Cancer Society, and the Cancer Action Network. In 2009, the firm partnered with Hart Research Associates to conduct a survey among registered U.S. voters to determine public opinion in America on immunizations for children in developing countries. The project was commissioned by the Bill & Melinda Gates Foundation.

In 2012, the firm invested in the series A round of an online fundraising platform, Rally.org, alongside Bully Pulpit Initiative, Greylock Partners, Charity: Water, and Google Ventures. Together, the investors raised $7.9 million. In September 2013, Vianovo funded and completed a survey of 1,000 Mexican citizens on Mexican President Enrique Peña Nieto’s energy reform agenda to assess the Mexican political landscape and gauge public opinion.

In both 2012 and 2016, the firm and advertising agency GSD&M conducted a national poll of U.S. adults measuring American perceptions of Mexico.

In 2015, Valeant Pharmaceuticals hired Vianovo for crisis management support related to public scrutiny and congressional investigations of the company’s drug pricing. In 2016, the firm began representing Bears for Leadership Reform, a group of Baylor University alumni advocating for transparency and changes to the university’s governance in response to its sexual assault scandal.
