= Matt Lee (journalist) =

American journalist (born 1965)

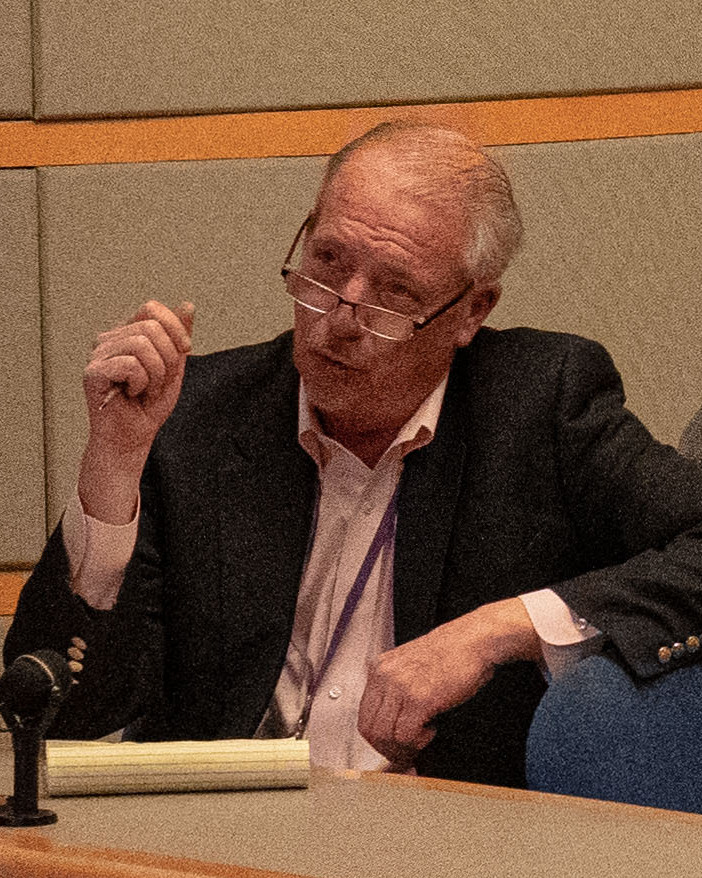
- Lee in 2023
- Born: September 9, 1965 (age 60)
- Education: Georgetown University (BSFS)
- Occupation: Journalist
- Employer: Associated Press
- Awards: Arthur Ross Media Award (2019)

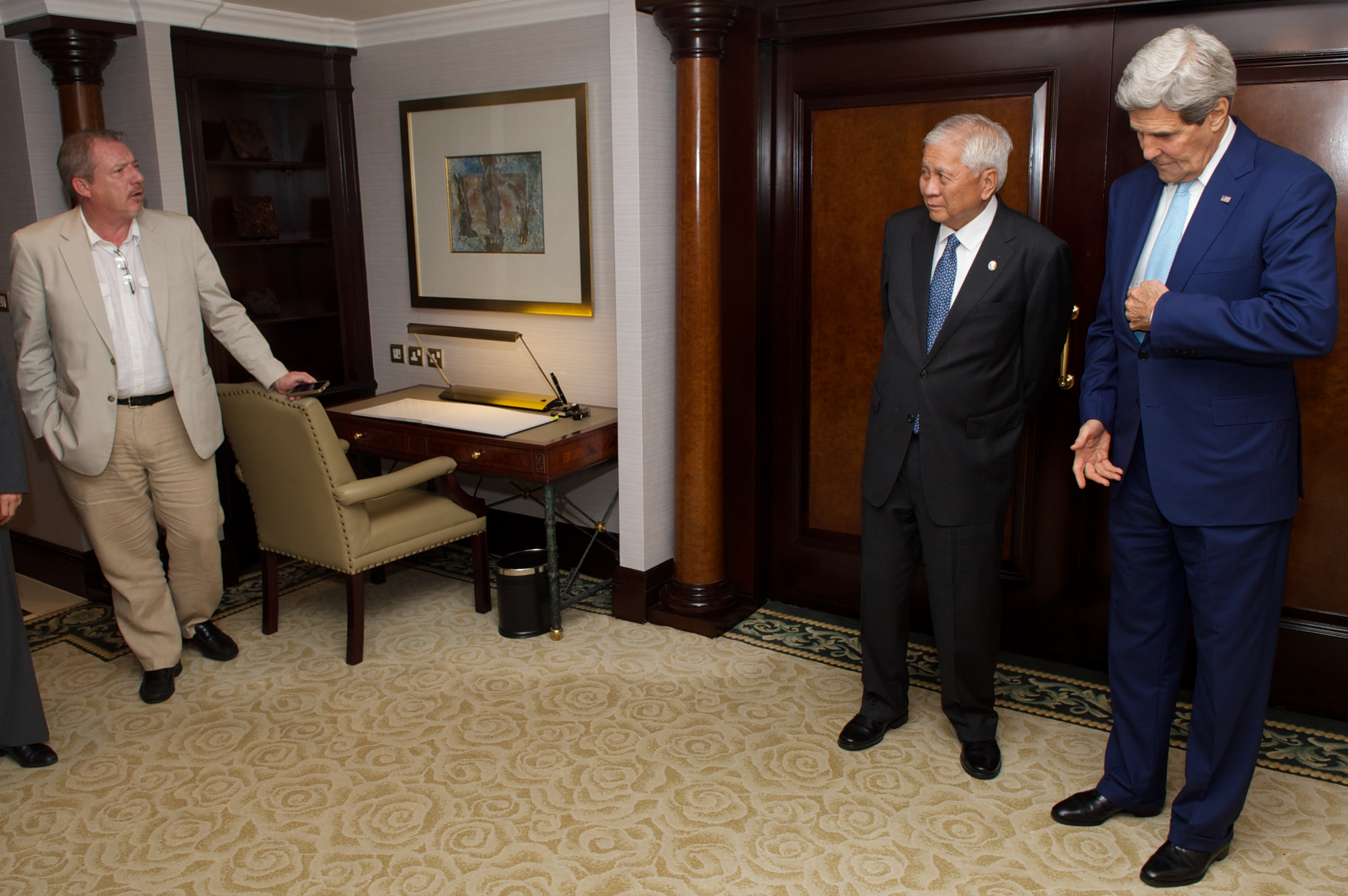
Lee with United States Secretary of State John Kerry and Secretary of Foreign Affairs of the Philippines Albert del Rosario in 2014

Matthew Lee (born September 9, 1965) is an American journalist and diplomatic writer who has been working for the Associated Press since 2007. He previously wrote for Agence France-Presse from 1995 to 2007, as well as working for The Daily Progress and The Washington Post.

== Early life and education ==
Lee graduated from Georgetown University School of Foreign Service with a Bachelor of Science in Foreign Service degree in international relations in 1989.

== Career ==
After college, he started working at The Washington Post as a news aide, a job he said in a 2019 interview started his interest in journalism. He then proceeded to move to Charlottesville, Virginia to work for The Daily Progress as a local news reporter. In 1994, Lee moved to Cambodia and worked as a freelance reporter for The Cambodia Daily and several international news outlets. In 1995, he joined Agence France-Presse and became their Phnom Penh bureau chief. On June 17, 1997, while covering a firefight in Phnom Penh between gunmen aligned respectively to the two co-rulers of Cambodia, Lee was wounded by shrapnel. From 1999 to 2005, Lee covered the United States Department of State for AFP, before becoming deputy bureau chief of Agence France-Presse's East Africa bureau in Nairobi, Kenya. In 2007, he moved back to Washington D.C. and started covering the United States State Department for the Associated Press.

As the State Department reporter for the Associated Press, Lee has been noted on multiple occasions as unusually assertive in exchanges with State Department Spokespersons Victoria Nuland, Jen Psaki, Ned Price, and Matthew Miller. In an article about the importance of an adversarial press, Nathan J. Robinson of Current Affairs described Lee's February 2022 exchange with Price as "a master class in how journalists should approach government claims".

== Personal life ==
Lee is married and has a daughter.
