= Vedant Patel =

Spokesperson for the U.S. Department of State

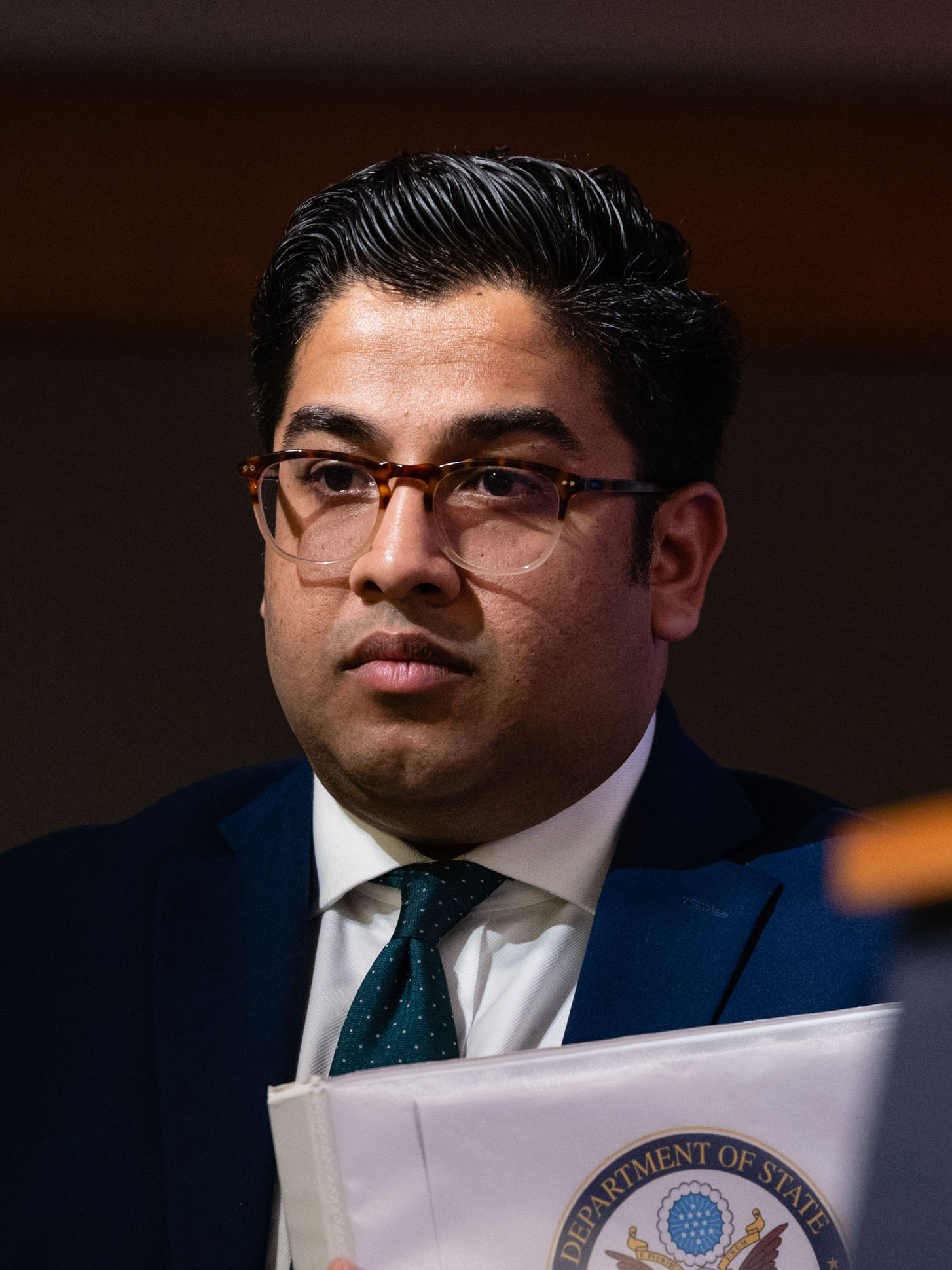
- Vedant Patel in 2023

Principal Deputy Spokesperson for the United States Department of State
- In office June 6, 2022 – January 20, 2025
- President: Joe Biden
- Preceded by: Jalina Porter
- Succeeded by: Tommy Pigott

Assistant White House Press Secretary
- In office January 20, 2021 – June 1, 2022
- President: Joe Biden

Personal details
- Education: University of California, Riverside (BS); University of Florida (MBA)

Vedant Patel is an American government official who was the Principal Deputy Spokesperson for the United States Department of State from June 2022, to January 2025 under Joe Biden. He has previously served as a spokesperson at the White House, for the Joe Biden 2020 presidential campaign, and for other politicians and organizations.

== Early life and education ==
Patel was born in Gujarat, India, and grew up in San Jose, California and attended Branham High School. He graduated from the University of California, Riverside with a degree in biology. He received a Master of Business Administration from the University of Florida.

== Career ==
Patel has worked as the communications director for U.S. Representatives Pramila Jayapal and Mike Honda, and has served as a press secretary for the Democratic National Committee.

After working for the 2020 Biden presidential campaign and the Biden presidential transition, president-elect Biden named Patel to be an Assistant White House Press Secretary in his upcoming administration in December 2020. He served in this capacity starting in January 2021, after Biden's inauguration.

On June 1, 2022, Patel left his position at the White House to serve as the Principal Deputy Spokesperson for the United States Department of State, starting his new post on June 6, 2022.

In September 2022 Patel became the first Indian American to conduct the daily press briefing at the United States Department of State.

In March 2023, after Ned Price left his post, Patel took over as the leading State Department spokesperson on an interim basis before Matthew Miller assumed the position on April 24, 2023.

The PR firm SKDK announced in May 2025 that Patel had been made senior vice president of their office in Washington, D.C. several months following the firm registering as a foreign agent to represent Israel.

Political offices
Preceded by Jalina Porter	Principal Deputy Spokesperson for the United States Department of State; 2022–2025	Succeeded by Tommy Pigott
