= Joint Sword-2024A =

Chinese military exercises

- Part of the Fourth Taiwan Strait Crisis
- Locations of the operational zones utilized by the PLA for Joint Sword-2024A
- Location: Northwest Pacific Ocean: Taiwan Strait; East China Sea; Philippine Sea; Luzon Strait; South China Sea
- Planned by: China
- Commanded by: Xi Jinping
- Objective: Retaliate against Taiwanese president Lai Ching-te's inauguration; Test capabilities of joint sea-air combat-readiness patrol, joint seizure of comprehensive battlefield control, and joint precision strikes on key targets
- Date: 23–24 May 2024 (1 day)
- Executed by: People's Liberation Army; Eastern Theater Command
- Outcome: Continuation of the Fourth Taiwan Strait Crisis

The Joint Sword-2024A (Chinese: 联合利剑—2024A) was a military exercise organized by the Eastern Theater Command of the People's Liberation Army (PLA) to organize the land, sea, air, and rocket forces of the theatre of operations in the vicinity of Kinmen, Matsu Islands, and the Island of Taiwan.

The Eastern Theater Command of Operations conducted the initial round of military drills from May 23 to May 24, 2024, Beijing time. It was followed by the Joint Sword-2024B that was conducted on October 14 to 15, 2024, Beijing time.

== Exercises ==
The People's Liberation Army's Eastern Theater Command initiated joint exercises and training in the Taiwan Strait, the northern, southern, and eastern regions of the island of Taiwan, as well as the areas surrounding Kinmen, Matsu Islands, Wuqiu Island, and Dongyin Island, at 0745 hours on May 23, 2024. After the Joint Operations Command Center of the Eastern Theatre issued operational instructions, the East Sea Fleet's numerous frigate formations maneuvered at high velocities in multiple directions to the waters surrounding the island of Taiwan. The ships initiated combat deployment upon their scheduled arrival at the designated sea area. The Eastern Theater Command Air Force conducted systematic war patrols around Taiwan and the outer islands by deploying dozens of fighter aircraft. The People's Liberation Army Rocket Force provided support and cover for multi-model formations, which were fully loaded with live ammunition, as they flew to predetermined airspace to establish a number of strike positions.

On May 23, Li Xi, the spokesman for the Eastern Theater Command, stated that the separatist forces seeking "uniqueness" are "Taiwan independence" and are demonstrating strong discipline. He also issued a serious warning to external forces that are interfering with provocations. Li Xi then disclosed the use of weapons and equipment, including Chengdu J-20, Shenyang J-16, Type 052C destroyer, Type 071 amphibious transport dock, Dongfeng series missiles, and box-type long-range rockets.

== See also ==
- Chinese military exercises around Taiwan
