= Matthew Dowd =

American political pundit and consultant (born 1961)

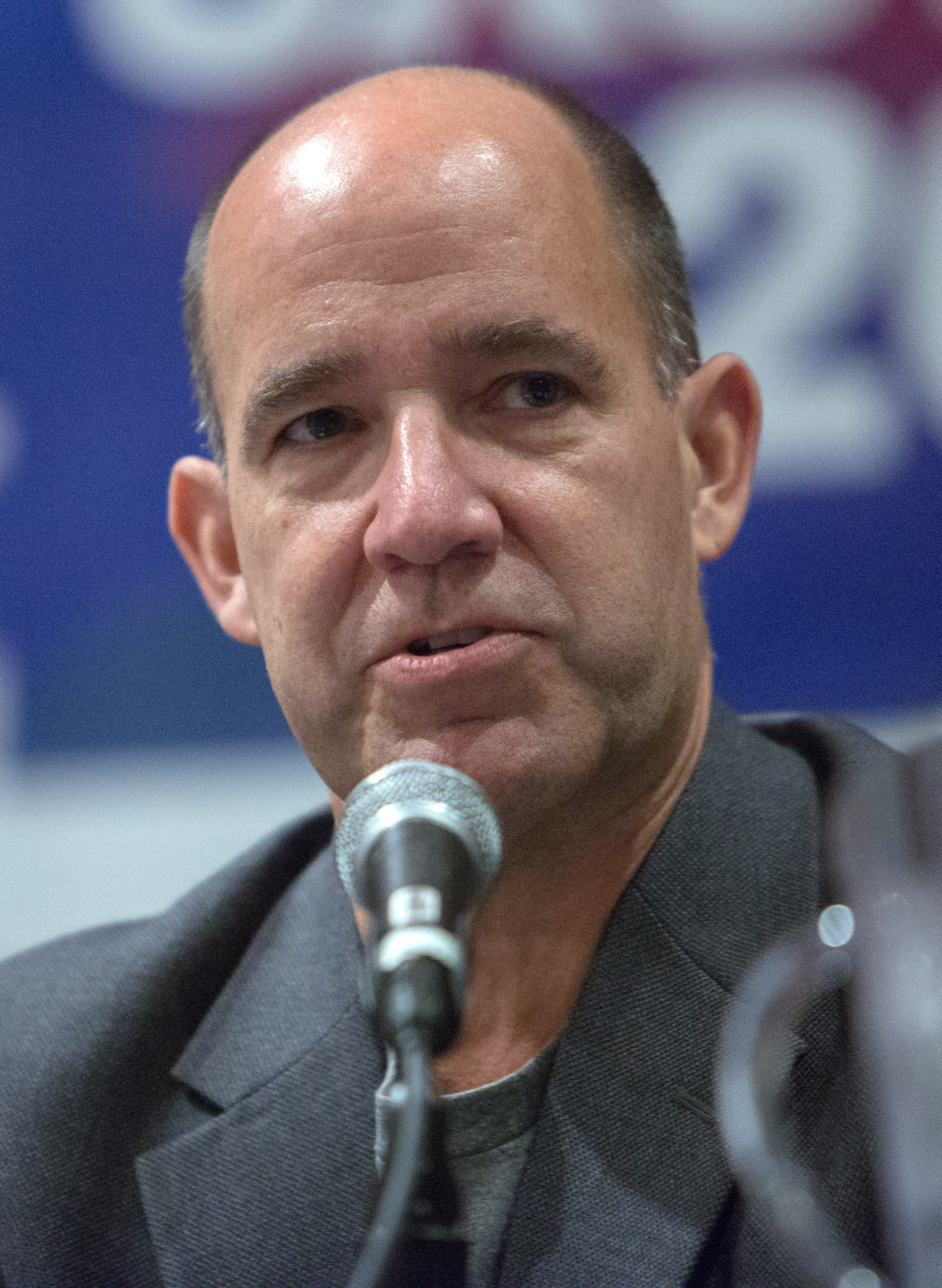
- Dowd in 2017
- Born: Matthew John Dowd; May 29, 1961 (age 65); Detroit, Michigan, U.S.
- Political party: Democratic (before 1999, 2021–present); Independent (2008–2021); Republican (1999–2007)
- Spouse(s): Tammy L. Edgerly (divorced); Nikki (divorced)
- Children: 5

Matthew John Dowd (born May 29, 1961) is an American political pundit and consultant. He is the former chief strategist for the Bush–Cheney 2004 presidential campaign and a former political analyst with ABC News and MSNBC.

== Early life ==
Dowd was born in Detroit, Michigan, to an Irish Catholic family. He grew up the third of 11 children; his father was an auto executive and his mother was an elementary school teacher before becoming a homemaker. His parents were Republicans. Dowd attended Cardinal Newman College in St. Louis, Missouri. Dowd attributes his early interest in politics to the Watergate Committee hearings during the summer of 1973 when he was 12 years old.

== Political career ==
Dowd volunteered for the campaign of Rep William Broomfield (R-MI) and, while attending college in St. Louis, Missouri, for the campaign of Governor Joseph P. Teasdale (D-MO) He also worked on the staff of Rep. Dick Gephardt, (D-MO). He began his political career as a Democrat, as a member of Senator Lloyd Bentsen's, (D-TX), Senate and campaign staffs. He also worked for, among others, Texas Lt. Governor Bob Bullock. In 1999, he switched parties to become a Republican.

During the 2002 midterm elections, Dowd was a senior adviser to the Republican National Committee. He was in charge of polling for the party committee and the White House. During the 2004 presidential election, Dowd was chief strategist for George W. Bush's re-election campaign. In 2024, Dowd, having rejoined the Democratic Party, stated that the allegations made by Swift Vets and POWs for Truth during the election were disproven and "nearly all lies". Dowd was the strategist for Arnold Schwarzenegger during his 2006 reelection campaign.

As reported in The New York Times on April 1, 2007, Dowd had come to feel a deep frustration with and great disappointment in George W. Bush, whom he criticized for failing to call the nation together in a time of war, for ignoring the will of the American public regarding the Iraq War, for his re-nomination of former UN ambassador John Bolton after his rejected confirmation and for failing to hold Secretary of Defense Donald Rumsfeld accountable for the Abu Ghraib scandal. According to Democracy Now!, Dowd claims to have undergone a change of heart regarding the Iraq War, and adopted a position advocating a withdrawal from that country, after contemplating the likelihood of his own son's deployment to the country, as well as after seeing Bush refuse to meet with anti-war-mother Cindy Sheehan in summer 2005, while he was entertaining Lance Armstrong at his ranch in Crawford, Texas; President Bush had previously met with Sheehan in June 2004. Dowd cited these incidents, as well as Bush's handling of the Hurricane Katrina disaster, as reasons for this change. Upon leaving the Bush administration, Dowd has not been on speaking terms with former White House political adviser Karl Rove. Sidney Blumenthal, in an opinion piece in Salon, titled "Matthew Dowd's not-so-miraculous conversion", described Dowd as an "opportunist".

=== Campaign for Lieutenant Governor of Texas ===
In September 2021, Dowd announced his campaign for Lieutenant Governor of Texas as a Democrat. In October 2021, the Texas Politics Project at the University of Texas at Austin, Democrat Lieutenant Governor Primary vote choice poll had Matthew Dowd with 13% of the primary vote. In early December, Dowd announced he was ending his bid for the post, citing a desire for more diversity in the race.

== Media career ==
In December 2007, he was introduced on ABC's Good Morning America as its new political contributor. He also appeared on the same network's This Week with George Stephanopoulos. Dowd was a founding partner of Vianovo, a strategy consultancy, which he left in 2015. He has taught at the University of Texas Lyndon B. Johnson School of Public Affairs. As of 2015, he is also a visiting Fellow at the University of Chicago Institute of Politics. He is co-author of The New York Times bestseller Applebee's America: How Successful Political, Business and Religious Leaders Connect with the New American Community. His book A New Way: Embracing the Paradox as We Lead and Serve was released in 2017.

On September 10, 2025, commenting on the assassination of Charlie Kirk, Dowd said on-air, "He's been one of the most divisive, especially divisive younger figures in this, who is constantly sort of pushing this sort of hate speech or sort of aimed at certain groups. And I always go back to, hateful thoughts lead to hateful words, which then lead to hateful actions. And I think that is the environment we are in. You can't stop with these sort of awful thoughts you have and then saying these awful words and not expect awful actions to take place. And that's the unfortunate environment we are in." Dowd also speculated that the shooter may have been a supporter, stating: "We don't know if this was a supporter shooting their gun off in celebration. So we have no idea about this." Later that day, MSNBC president Rebecca Kutler denounced Dowd's comments, saying, "During our breaking news coverage of the shooting of Charlie Kirk, Matthew Dowd made comments that were inappropriate, insensitive, and unacceptable. We apologize for his statements, as has he. There is no place for violence in America, political or otherwise." That evening, Dowd was fired from MSNBC.

== Personal life ==
Dowd has married and divorced twice. He has three sons from his first marriage. His second marriage ended in divorce after one of his twin infant daughters died in the hospital. His eldest son, Daniel, is an Army veteran of Operation Iraqi Freedom and was deployed to Baghdad from 2007 to 2009 as a signals intelligence specialist.

Dowd has criticized President Trump's Twitter use as being dangerous, impulsive, and counterproductive. Dowd was especially upset with tweets aimed at the leader of North Korea. During the first impeachment inquiry against Donald Trump in 2019, Dowd tweeted about a congresswoman, "Elise Stefanik is a perfect example of why just electing someone because they are a woman or a millennial doesn't necessarily get you the leaders we need." Congresswoman Stefanik called the tweet "disgusting, sexist, and shameful". After significant pressure, Dowd apologized and removed the tweet in question.

== Bibliography ==
- Applebee's America: How Successful Political, Business, and Religious Leaders Connect With the New American Community (2006) ISBN 9780743287197
- A New Way: Embracing the Paradox as We Lead and Serve (2017) ISBN 9781544500324
