= Jalina Porter =

American political advisor

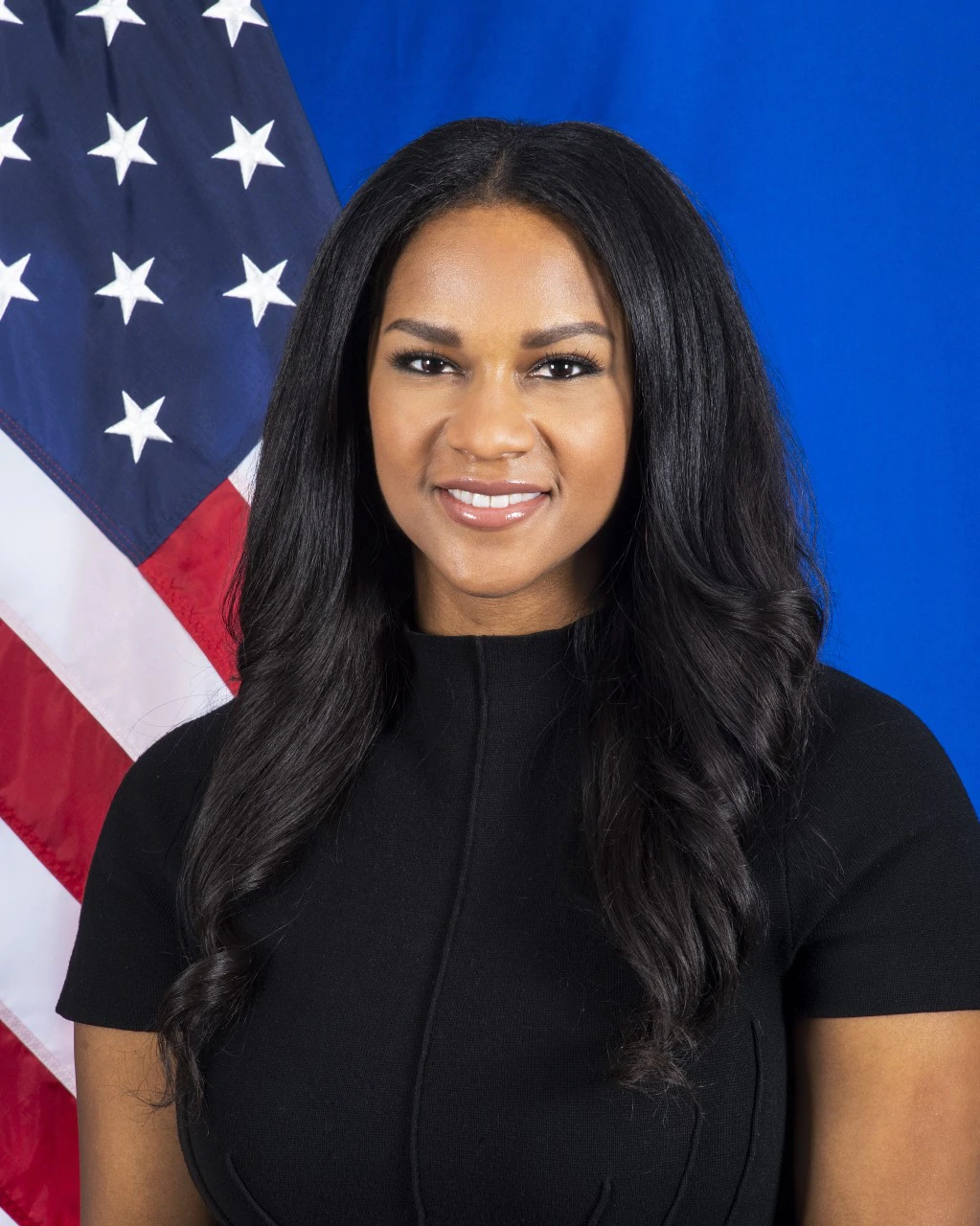
- Official portrait, 2021

Principal Deputy Spokesperson for the United States Department of State
- In office January 20, 2021 – June 3, 2022
- President: Joe Biden
- Preceded by: Cale Brown
- Succeeded by: Vedant Patel

Personal details
- Born: Baton Rouge, Louisiana, U.S.
- Party: Democratic
- Education: Howard University (Bachelor in Marketing); Georgetown University (Master of Global Strategic Communications)
- Website: https://www.jalinaporter.com/

Jalina Porter is an American political advisor who was the Principal Deputy Spokeswoman for the United States Department of State from January 2021 to June 2022 under President Joe Biden. Porter made State Department history as the first African American woman to hold the position.

== Early life and education ==
Porter was born in Baton Rouge, Louisiana to executive and former NFL wide receiver Tracy Porter and Terri Bishop Porter. She attended Carondelet High School where she was a four-year member of the Varsity Track and Field team, Varsity Song, peer counselor, and recipient of the Presidential Service Award. Porter was also active in Jack and Jill of America, Inc. during her adolescence.

Porter received a bachelor's degree in marketing from Howard University and a master's degree in Global Strategic Communications from Georgetown University. While at Howard, Porter became a member of Delta Sigma Theta sorority and frequently engaged in service projects, including rebuilding homes in the ninth ward of New Orleans, Louisiana after Hurricane Katrina.

== Career ==
Porter worked as a Peace Corps volunteer in Cambodia where she taught English in Ministry schools and worked with local and international nongovernmental organizations. She was recognized by the Peace Corps as a recipient of the Franklin H. Williams Award for her lifetime commitment to humanitarian work and community service.

Porter previously served in the U.S. House of Representatives as Communications Director for former Congressman Cedric Richmond of Louisiana. While working on Capitol Hill, Porter became a congressional fellow at Stanford University's Hoover Institution. Porter is a current Term Member at the Council on Foreign Relations, a lifetime member of the Girl Scouts, and a member of The Links, Incorporated.

She is a former professional dancer for the Washington Wizards and NFL cheerleader for the Oakland Raiders. Porter appeared on the MTV series MADE as a professional cheer coach.

=== Principal Deputy Spokesperson of the State Department ===
On January 20, 2021, Porter was sworn in as Principal Deputy Spokesperson for the United States Department of State in the Biden administration, succeeding Cale Brown from the Trump administration. Porter left office on June 3, 2022.

Porter also served as Spokesperson for United States Ambassador to the United Nations Linda Thomas-Greenfield.

Political offices
| Preceded by Cale Brown | Principal Deputy Spokesperson for the United States Department of State; 2021–2022 | Succeeded by Vedant Patel |
