= Joint Sword-2024B =

- Part of the Fourth Taiwan Strait Crisis
- Locations of the operational zones utilized by the PLA for Joint Sword-2024B
- Location: Northwest Pacific Ocean: Taiwan Strait; East China Sea; Philippine Sea; Luzon Strait; South China Sea
- Planned by: China
- Commanded by: Xi Jinping
- Objective: Retaliate against Taiwanese president Lai Ching-te's speech on National Day; Test capabilities of sea-air combat-readiness patrol, blockade on key ports and areas, assault on maritime and ground targets, as well as joint seizure of comprehensive superiority
- Date: 14–15 October 2024 (1 day)
- Executed by: People's Liberation Army; Eastern Theater Command
- Outcome: Continuation of the Fourth Taiwan Strait Crisis

The Joint Sword-2024B (Chinese: 联合利剑—2024B) was a military exercise organized by the Eastern Theater Command of the People's Liberation Army (PLA) to organize the land, sea, air, and rocket forces of the theatre of operations in the vicinity of Kinmen, Matsu Islands, and the Island of Taiwan. It was conducted from October 14 to 15, 2024, Beijing time.

== Exercises ==
On October 14, the Eastern Theater Command of the People's Liberation Army (PLA) coordinated with the People's Liberation Army Navy (PLAN), People's Liberation Army Air Force (PLAAF), People's Liberation Army Rocket Force (PLARF) and Chinese Coast Guard to conduct "Joint Sword-2024B" maneuvers in the Taiwan Strait, as well six marked areas in the waters north, south, and east of the island of Taiwan, effectively surrounding Taiwan during the drills. According to Li Xi, a spokesman for the Chinese military's Eastern Theater Command, the different branches of the Chinese military focused the exercises on sea-air combat-readiness patrols, blockades on key ports and areas, assaults on maritime and ground targets and joint seizure of comprehensive superiority. During the operation, the Chinese Coast Guard sent four fleets of ships to conduct "law enforcement inspections" around Taiwan, and carried out "comprehensive law enforcement patrols" in waters surrounding the Dongyin and Matsu Islands. The Chinese military described the exercises as a "stern warning to the separatist acts of Taiwan Independence forces."

== Reactions ==
- Republic of China (Taiwan): The Defense Ministry strongly condemned the Chinese exercises, stating that they were "irrational and provocative" and vowing to deploy "appropriate forces" to respond in order to defend its sovereignty.
- People's Republic of China: China's military called the exercises a "stern warning to the separatist acts of Taiwan Independence forces."
- United States: The United States expressed that it was "seriously concerned" by the exercises, with the State Department stating that "The PRC response with military provocations to a routine annual speech is unwarranted and risks escalation," additionally urging China to "act with restraint" and avoid any further actions which may "undermine peace and stability" in the region.

== See also ==
- Chinese military exercises around Taiwan
