= Death and funeral of Lee Teng-hui =

2020 death of 1988–2000 ROC president

Funeral of Lee Teng-hui
Memorial

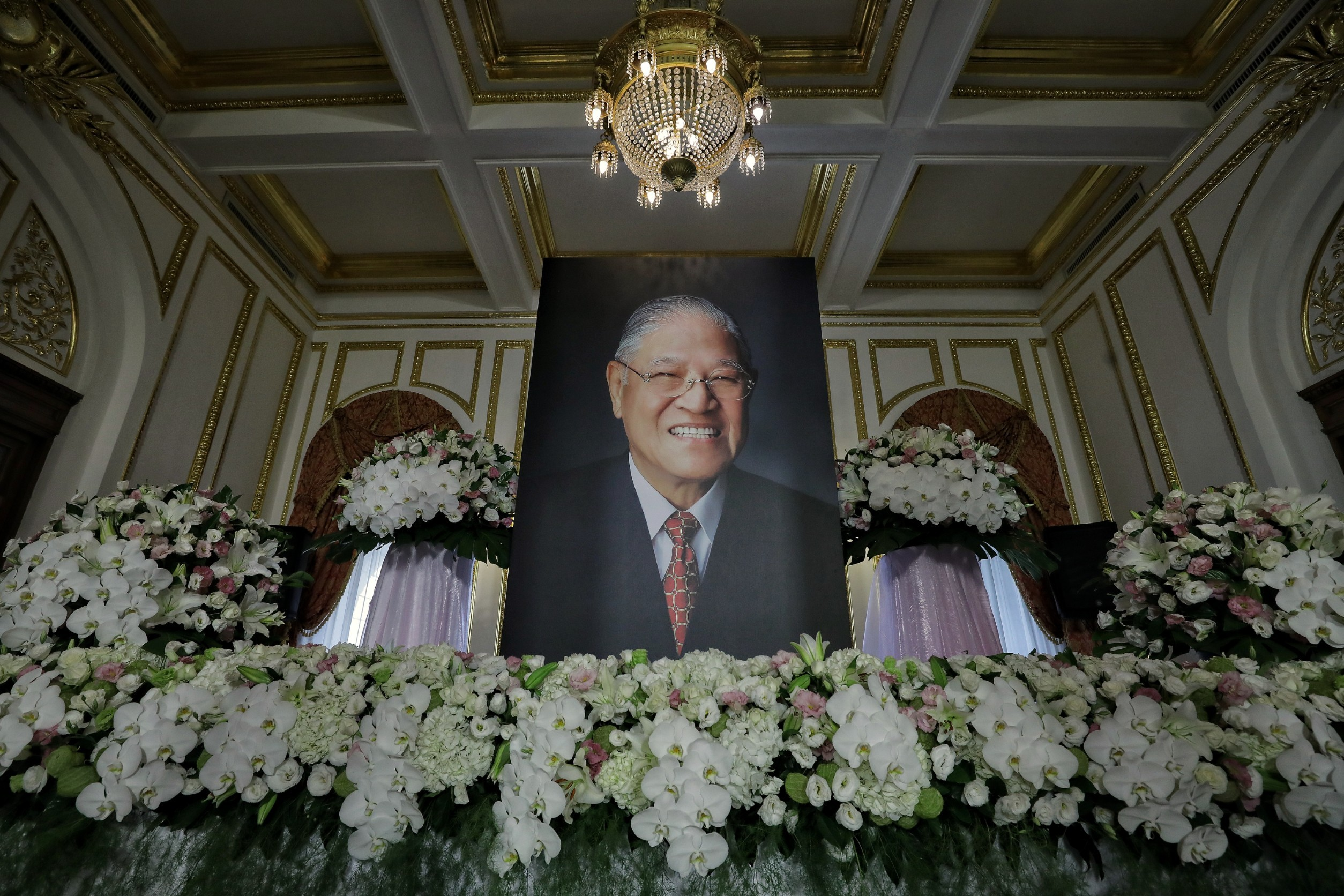
- Venue: Taipei Guest House
- Date: 1–16 August 2020

Funeral Service
- Venue: Che-lam Presbyterian Church
- Date: 14 August 2020

Farewell Service

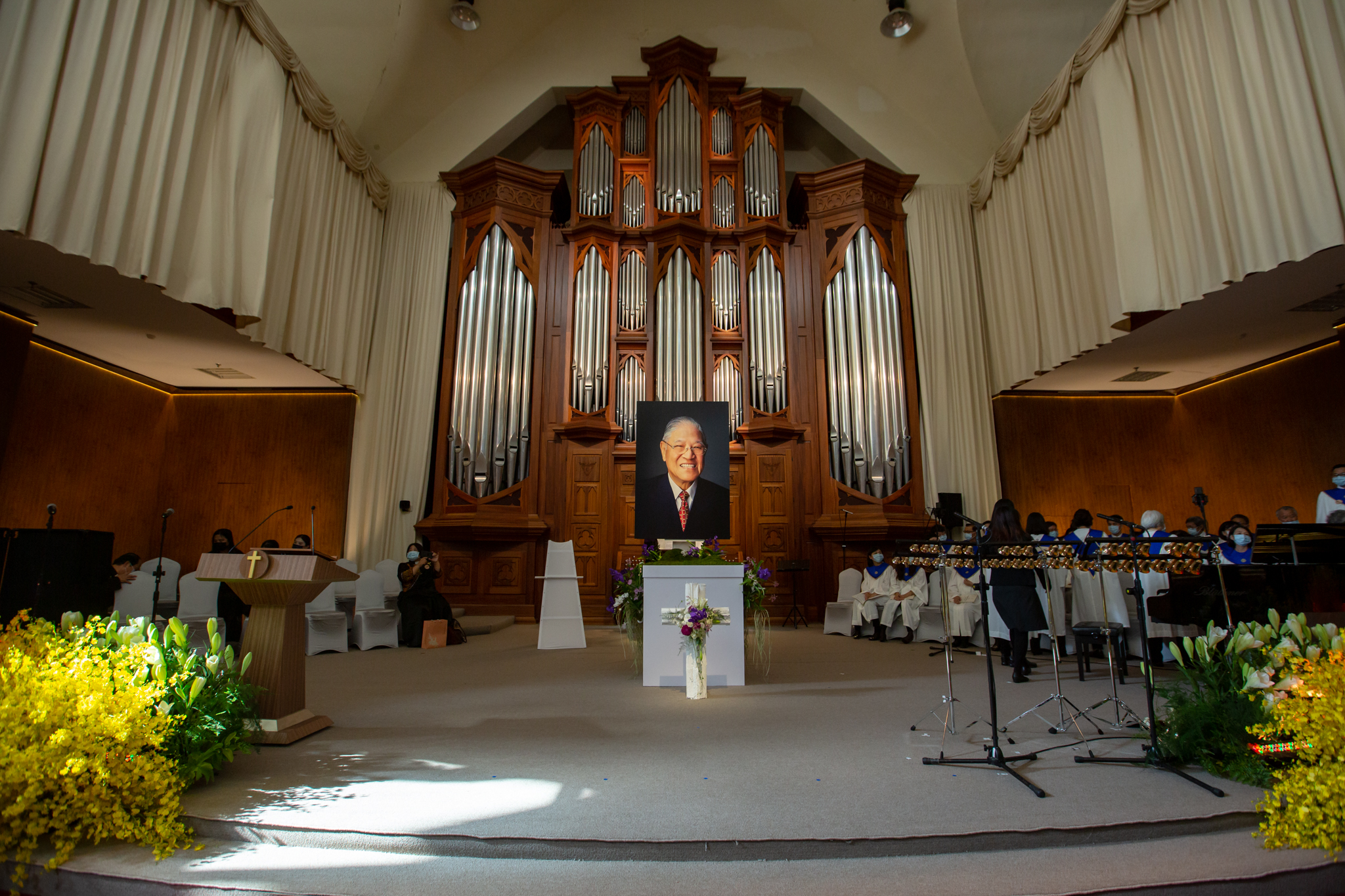
- Venue: Chapel, Aletheia University
- Date: 19 September 2020

Burial

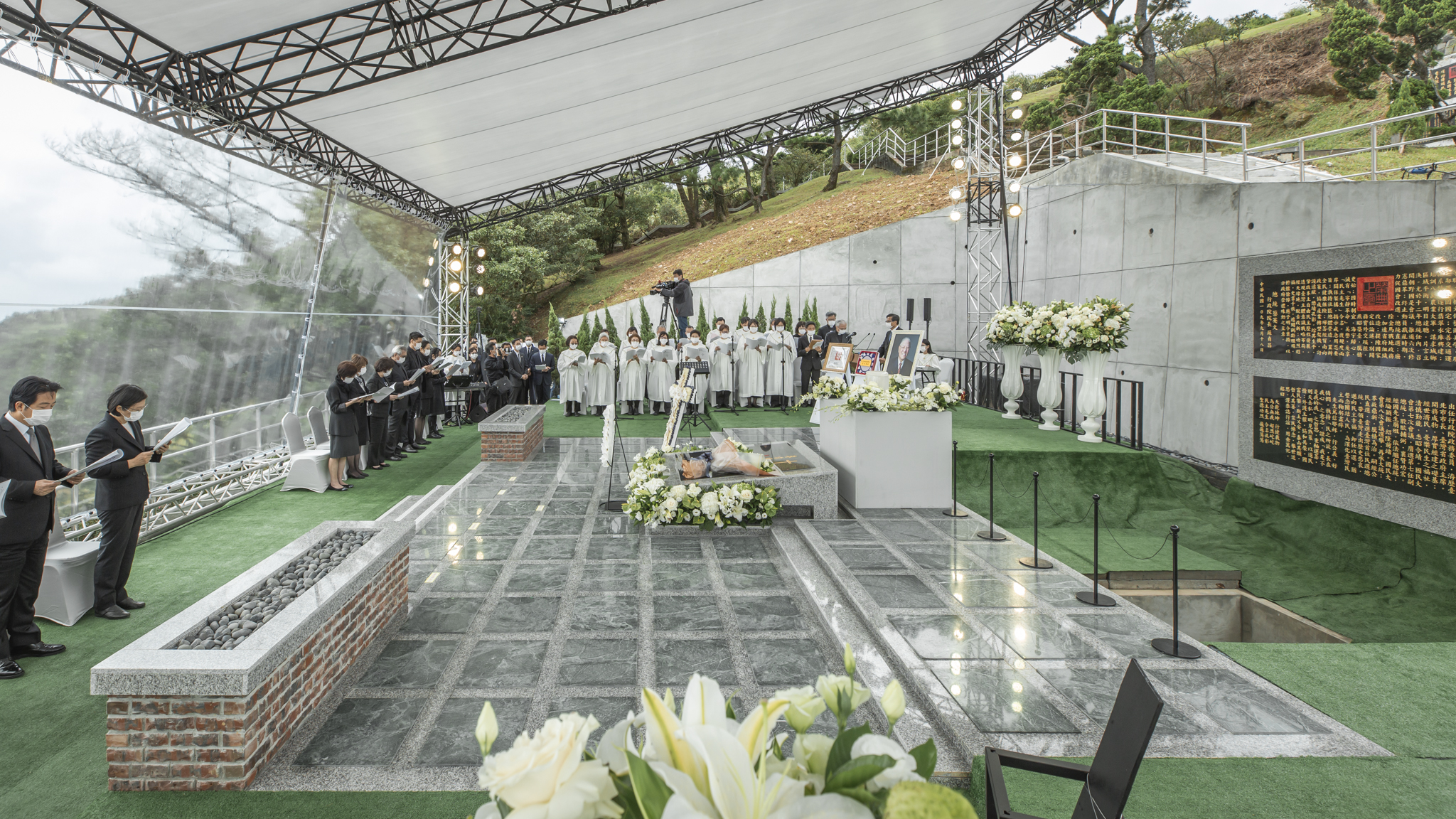
- Venue: Wuzhi Mountain Military Cemetery
- Date: 7 October 2020

Lee Teng-hui, former President of the Republic of China, died at age 97 of septic shock and multiple organ dysfunction at Taipei Veterans General Hospital on 30 July 2020.

President Tsai Ing-wen instructed a memorial to be set up at the Taipei Guest House from 1 to 16 August and the national flag to be flown at half-mast for three days starting 31 July. Lee was cremated on 14 August after a private funeral service and his ashes were interred at the Special Honour Zone of the Wu Chih-shan Military Cemetery on 7 October. He was commemorated at a public memorial service on 19 September.

== Illness and death ==
On 8 February 2020, Lee was hospitalised at Taipei Veterans General Hospital after choking while drinking milk and retained in the hospital under observation due to lung infection concerns. Later, he was diagnosed with aspiration pneumonia caused by pulmonary infiltration, and was subsequently intubated. President Tsai Ing-wen, Vice-president Lai Ching-te and Premier Su Tseng-chang visited Lee at the hospital on 29 July 2020. On 30 July, after a pastor's last prayer and accompanied by his family, Lee died of multiple organ failure and septic shock at Taipei Veterans General Hospital at 7:24 pm, aged 97 (98 in some sources, by East Asian age reckoning).

== Memorial ==
President Tsai Ing-wen instructed a memorial to be set up at the Taipei Guest House for the public from 1 to 16 August 2020 and the national flag to be flown at half-mast for three days starting noon of 31 July.

On 9 August, Yoshirō Mori, former prime minister of Japan, led a cross-party delegation and conveyed to President Tsai condolences from current Prime Minister Shinzo Abe before paying tribute to Lee at the Taipei Guest House, where he expressed gratitude for Lee's contributions to Japan–Taiwan relations and his support to Japan's post-war recovery. While not designated as an envoy, Mori is said to act on behalf of Abe. Mori had approved Lee's application for medical treatment in Japan during his premiership, against Beijing's protests and his cabinet's concerns.

On 12 August, Alex Azar, United States Secretary of Health and Human Services and the highest-level US official to visit Taiwan since 1979, paid his respects to Lee at the Taipei Guest House.

On 14 August, a woman, identified as retired entertainer Cheng Hui-chung, vandalised the memorial by throwing a balloon filled with red paint at Lee's portrait.

The memorial ended with Lee Chun-yi, deputy secretary general of the presidential office, leading the staff to bow three times to Lee's portrait. More than 43,000 people visited during the 16-day period.

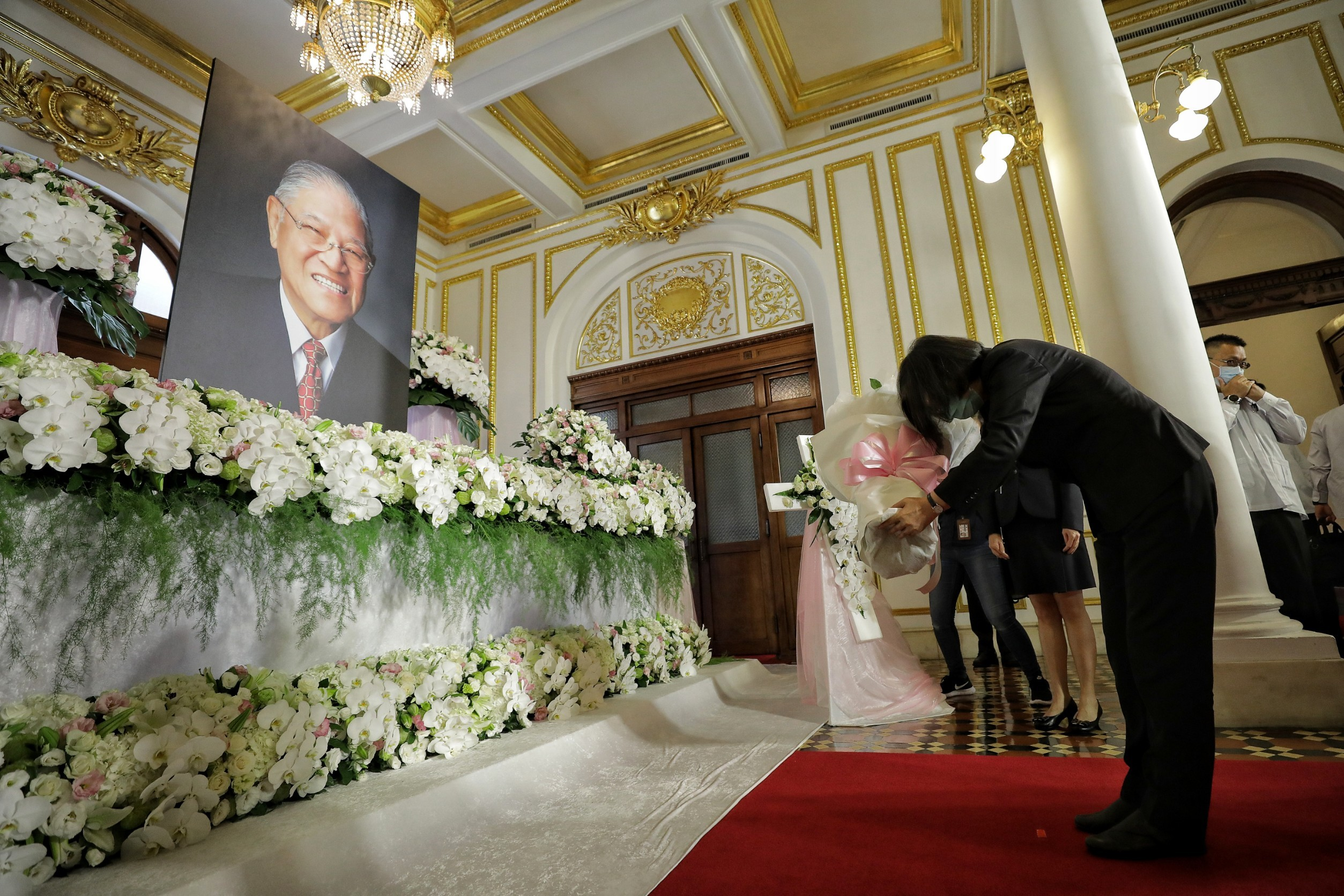
President Tsai Ing-wen paying tribute

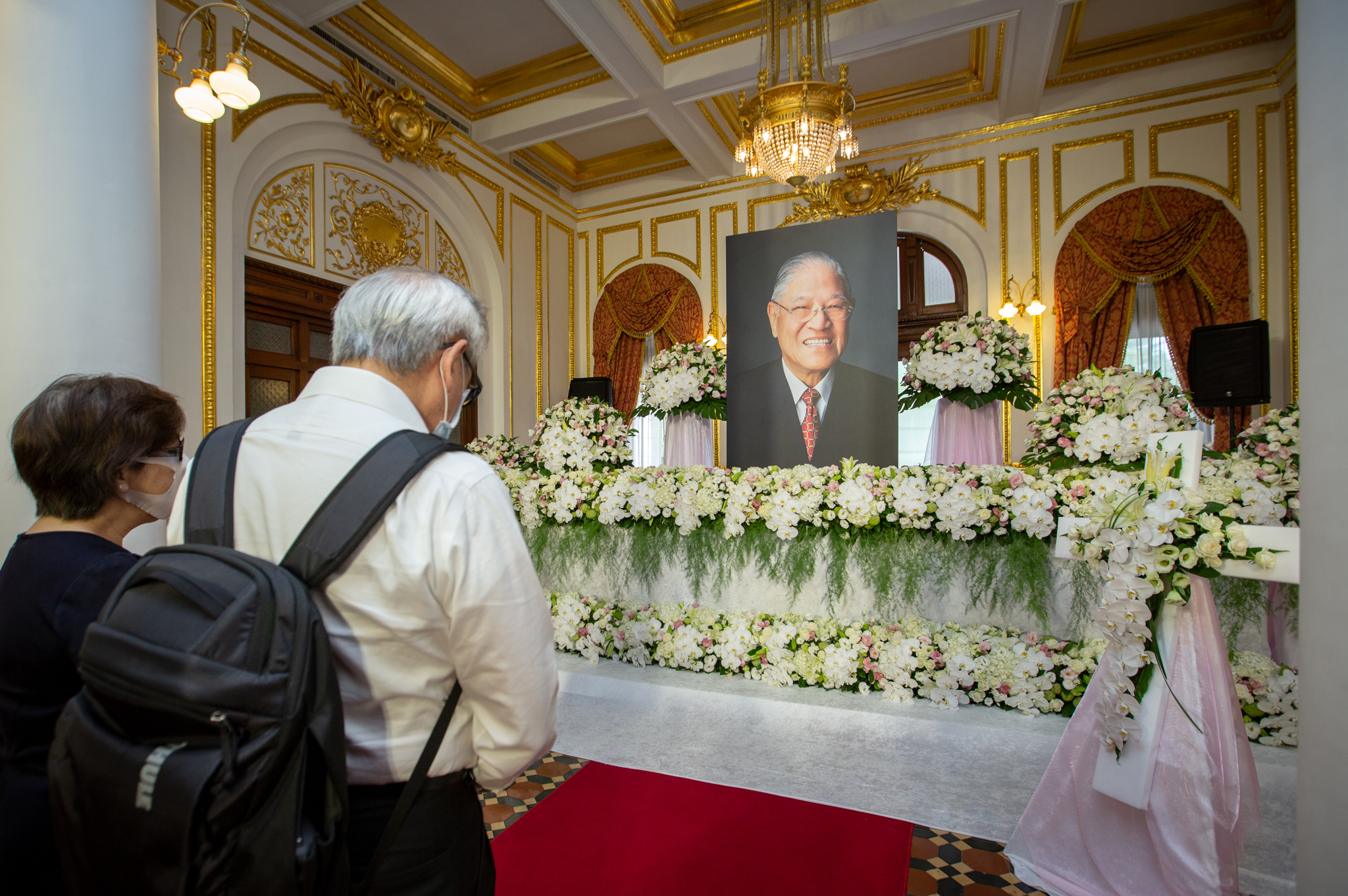
Taiwanese people paying tribute

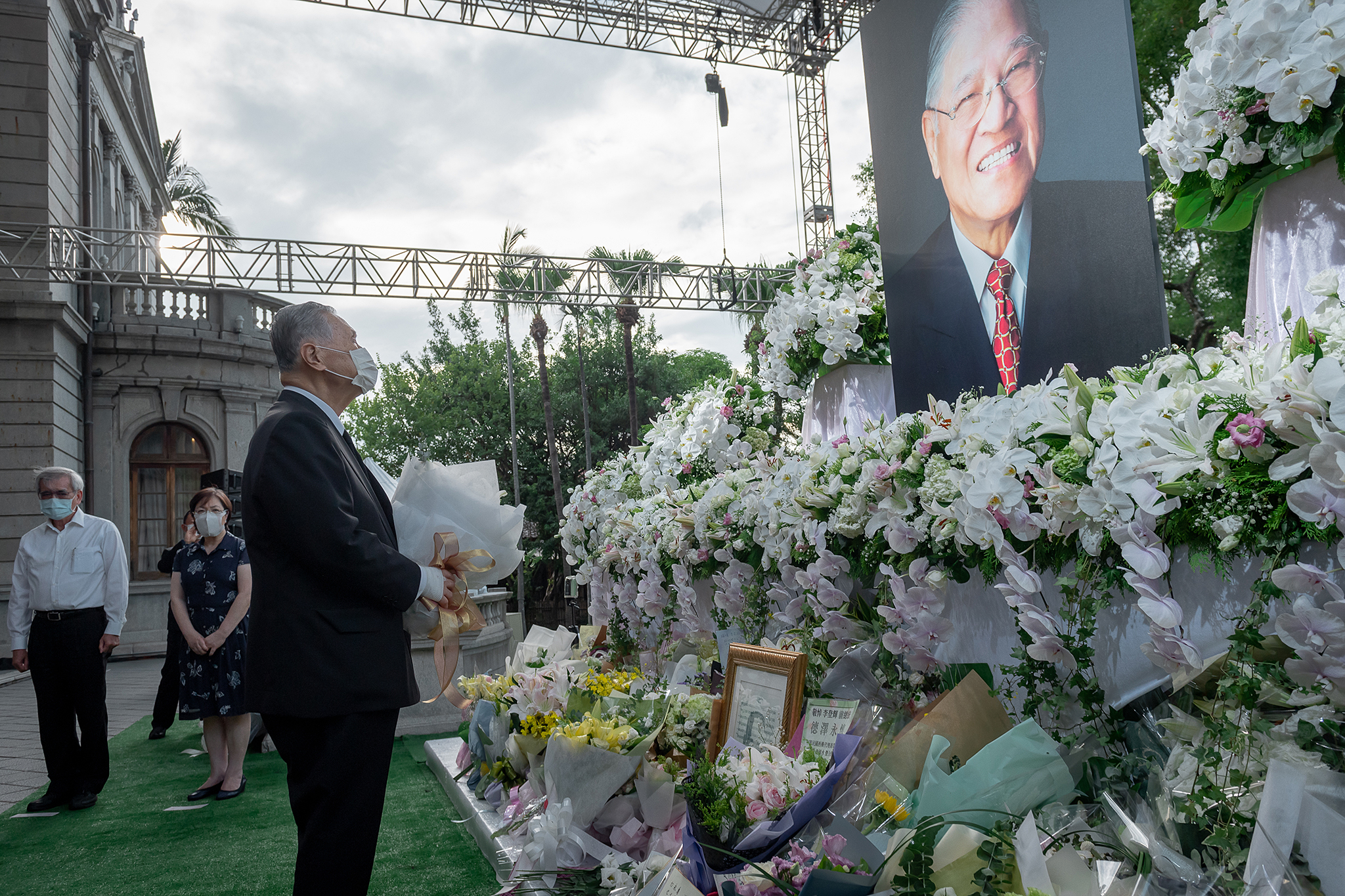
Yoshirō Mori paying tribute

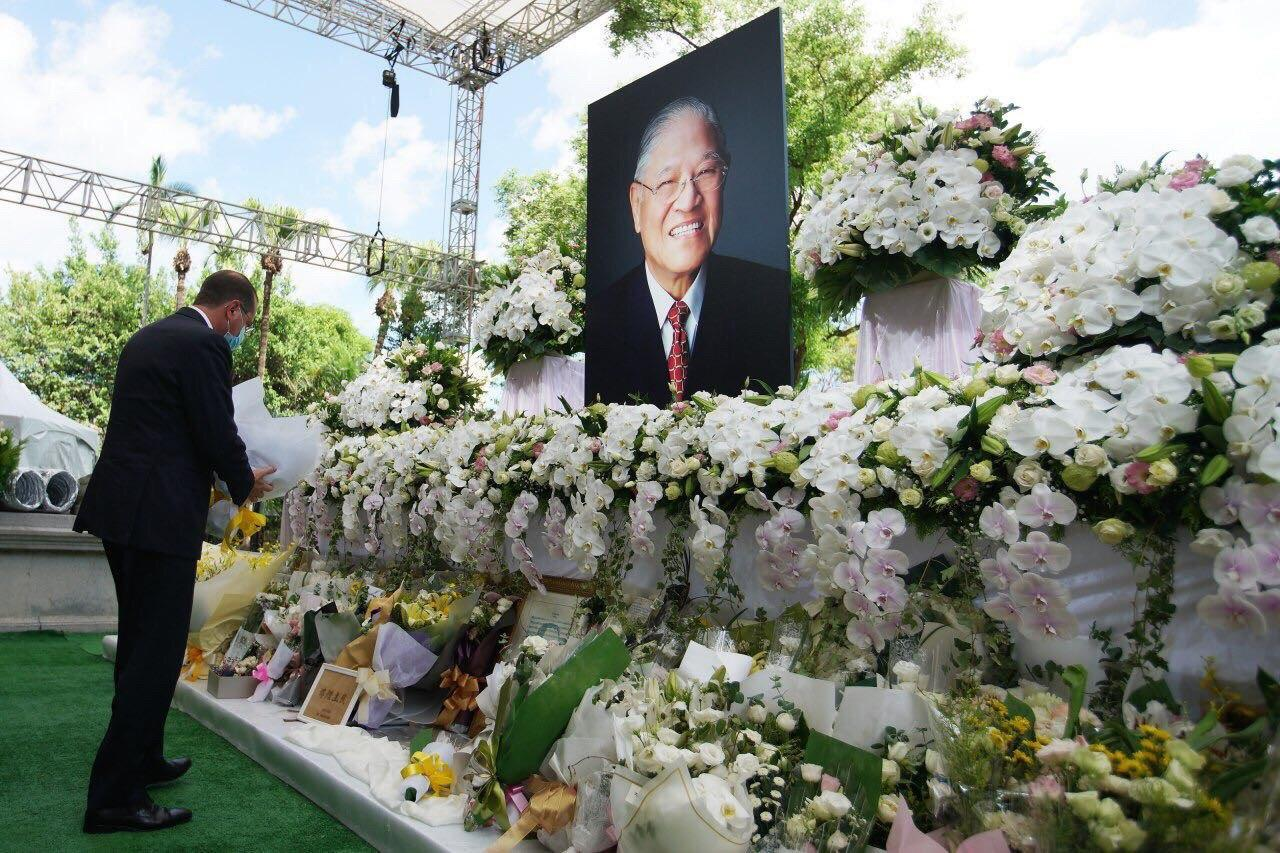
Alex Azar paying tribute

== Funeral ==
=== Planning ===
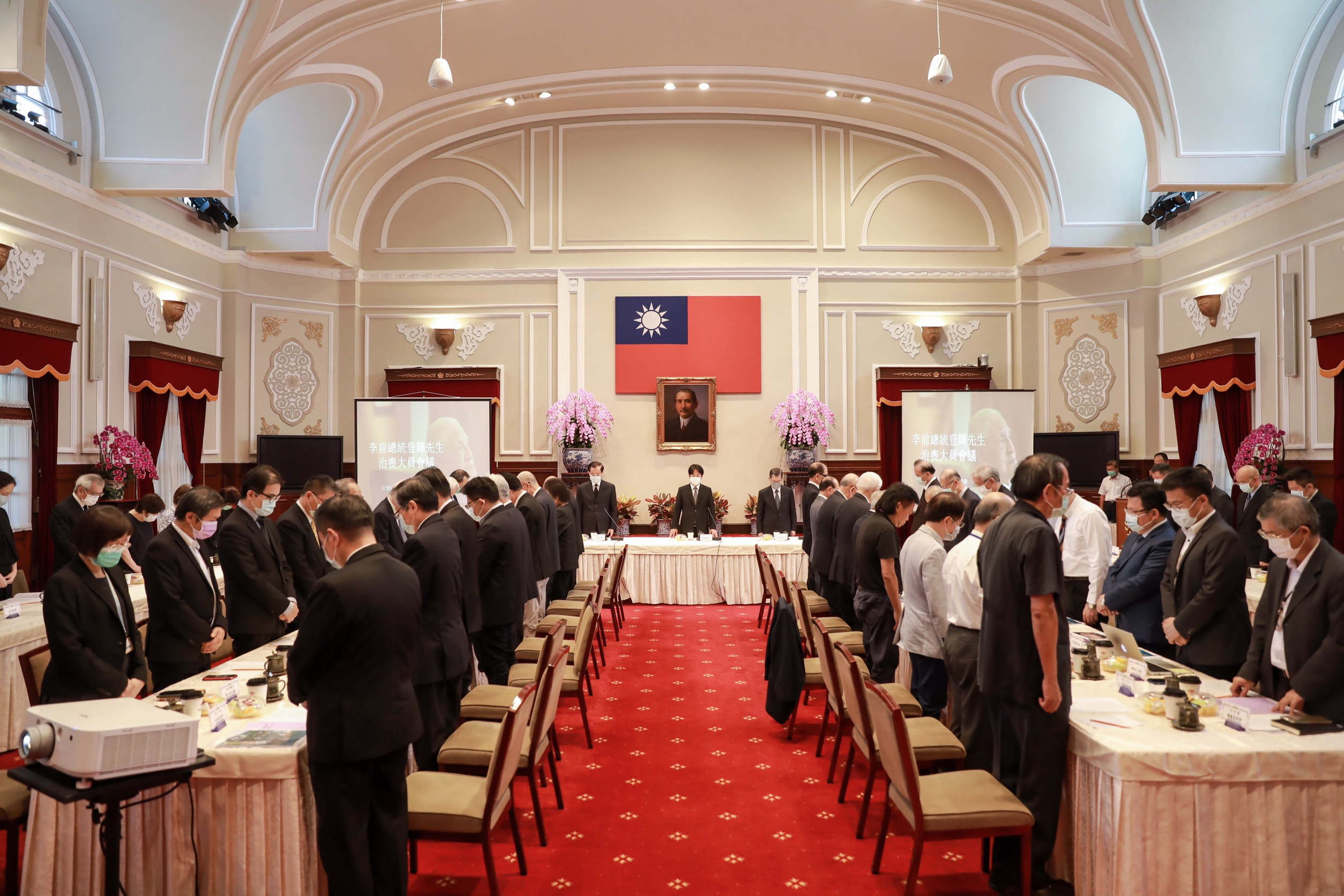
The funeral committee observing a minute of silence

A spokesperson of the presidential office said that despite the provision under the National Burial Act (1948) that a national with great contributions to the state or the mankind can be interred in a "national burial cemetery" in the national capital, the act has never been invoked due to the relocation of the government. In practice, the president appointed 21 members (in case of a passing president) to form a funeral committee, which arranges the funeral in the rite modelled after the national burial.

On 3 August, President Tsai announced a 32-member funeral committee, comprising Lai Ching-te (convenor), Lien Chan, Vincent Siew, Su Tseng-chang, Yu Shyi-kun, Hsu Tzong-li, Wu Jin-lin, Chen Chu, Wang Jin-pyng, Weng Yueh-sheng, Hsu Shui-teh, Chien Foo, David Lee, Wu Po-hsiung, Huang Kun-huei, Wellington Koo, James Soong, Peng Ming-min, Koo Kwang-ming, Morris Chang, Huang Kun-fu, Yuan Tseh Lee, Perng Fai-nan, Wang Wun-yuan, Chen Po-chih, Chiang Chi-chen, Ko Wen-je, Chiu Hsien-chih, Liu Yi-te, Hsu Kuo-yung, Joseph Wu and Yen Teh-fa. The list is noted for its inclusion of incumbent and former vice presidents, incumbent and former heads of the five government branches, senior government officials, party leaders across the Blue-Green camps and entrepreneurs.

As Lee was a Christian, the presidential office delegated the preparation of his funeral services to the Presbyterian Church in Taiwan, in accordance with the wish of his family, therefore the erecting of traditional memorial altars with incense and candles were not utilized.

Although Lee had said he wanted his ashes to be scattered on Jade Mountain, his family agreed to strike a balance between the institution of the state and the wish of the family, so that his thoughts "Complete reform from the traditions" and "Integrity and naturality" could be implemented. His younger daughter Annie also described Lee's last wishes as the strengthening of Taiwan's democracy and the unity of the Taiwanese people, and expressed a desire to demonstrate these through the arrangements of his funeral.

=== Funeral service and cremation ===
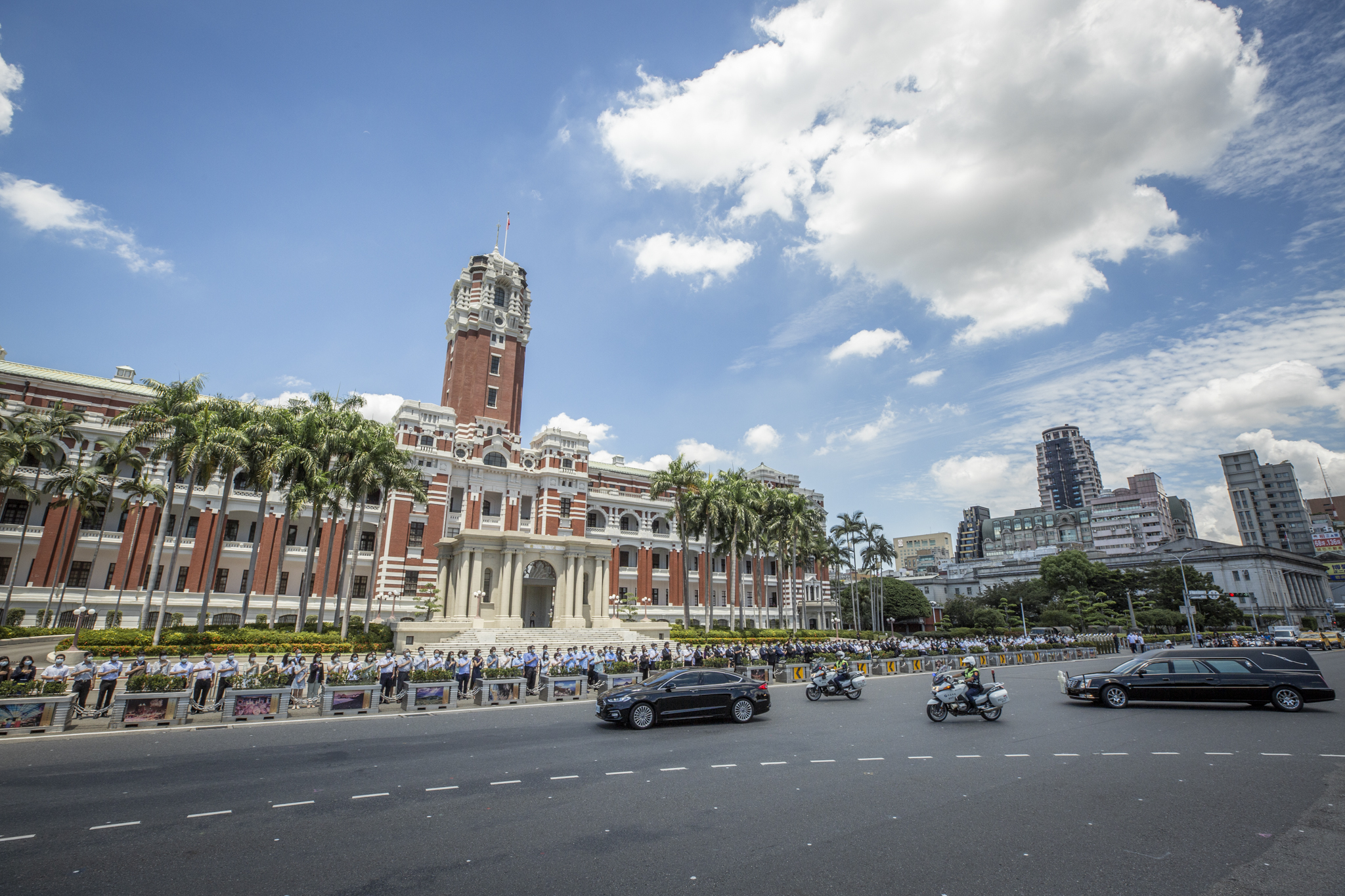
Lee's funeral procession making a lap around the Presidential Office Building

At 6:36 am on 14 August, the casket carrying Lee's remains was moved from Taipei Veterans General Hospital to Che-lam Presbyterian Church, where Lee's private funeral took place behind closed doors. At the start of ceremony, the bell was rung for 21 times, in an adaptation of the 21-gun salute in Western state funerals. The service was presided over by pastors Iap Khe-siong and Ng Chhun-seng. During the service, the Taiwanese Hokkien version of Lee's favourite hymns "Amazing Grace" and "Rock of Ages, cleft for me" were sung. Around 100 people, including 60 family members, some government officials and clergymen, attended the service but Lee's widow, Tseng Wen-hui, was absent over concern for her health.

After the funeral service, the funeral procession made a symbolic lap around the Presidential Office Building, where crowds lined up to pay their final tribute. David Lee, secretary general of the presidential office, and Wellington Koo Li-hsiung, secretary general of the National Security Council, headed the presidential office staff and military officers in a guard of honour. The cremation took place at Taipei City Second Funeral Parlor. Lee's granddaughter Lee Kun-yi carried the urn containing his ashes back to Lee's residence.

=== Farewell service ===
At 9 am on 19 September, the farewell service (memorial service) was held at the Main Chapel in Aletheia University, which was situated in Tamsui in New Taipei City; members of public could register to attend at the chapel and concert hall of the neighbouring Tamkang Senior High School. The title of the ceremony was "I do it with the People in my heart", taken from his speech during his visit to Cornell University in 1995. The ceremony was broadcast live.

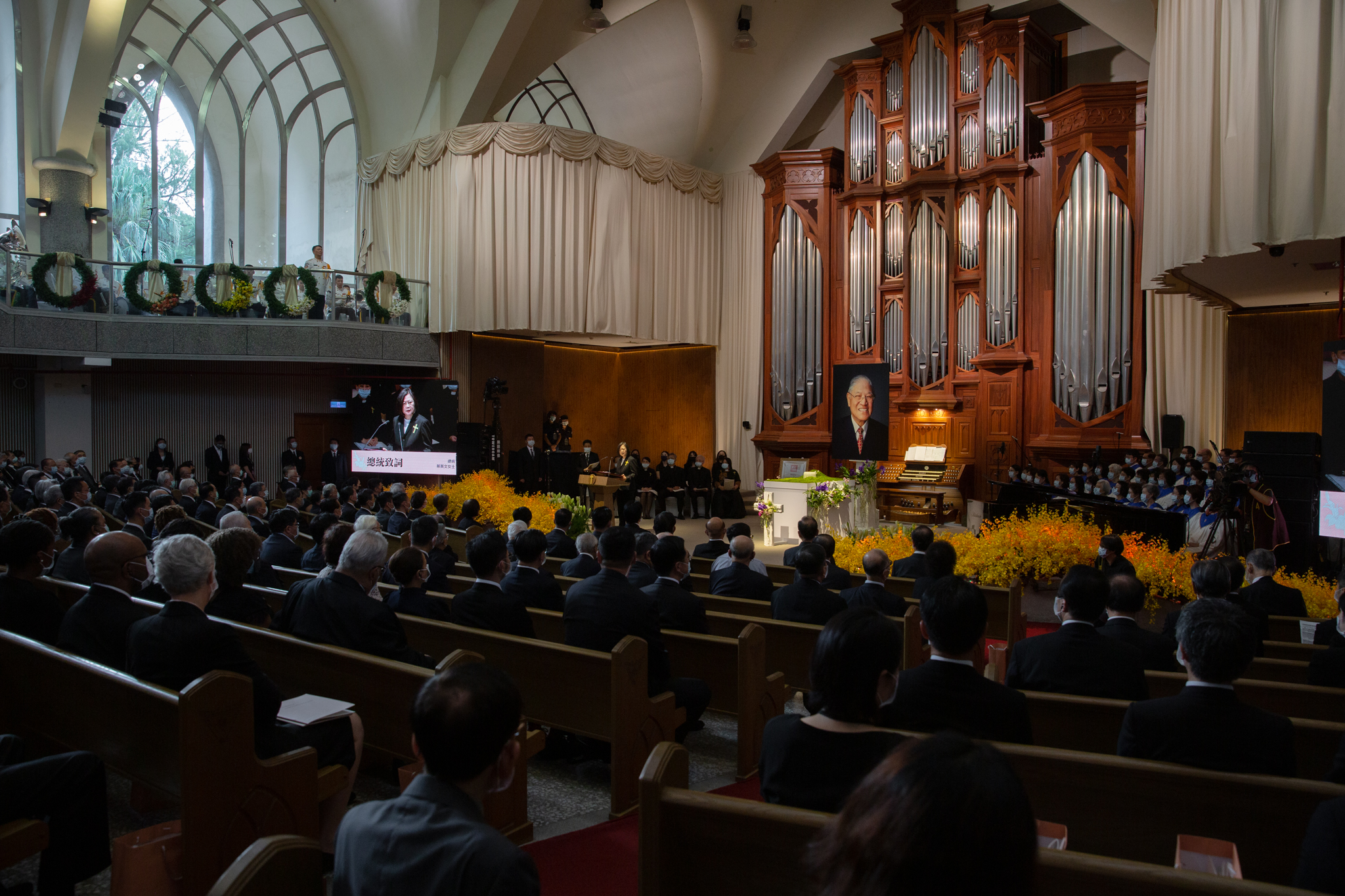
Main Venue: Chapel, Aletheia University

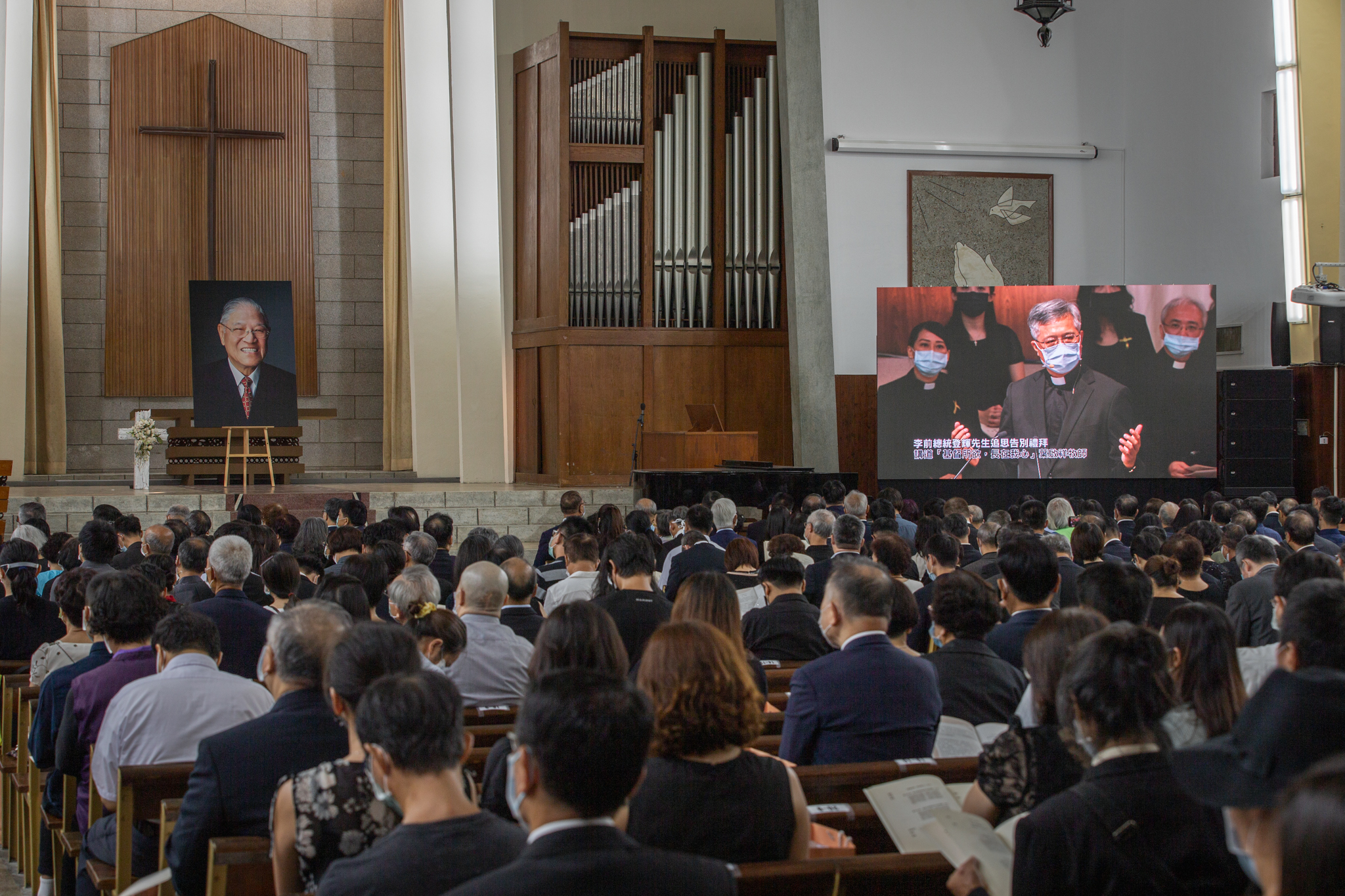
2nd Venue: Chapel, Tamkang Senior High School

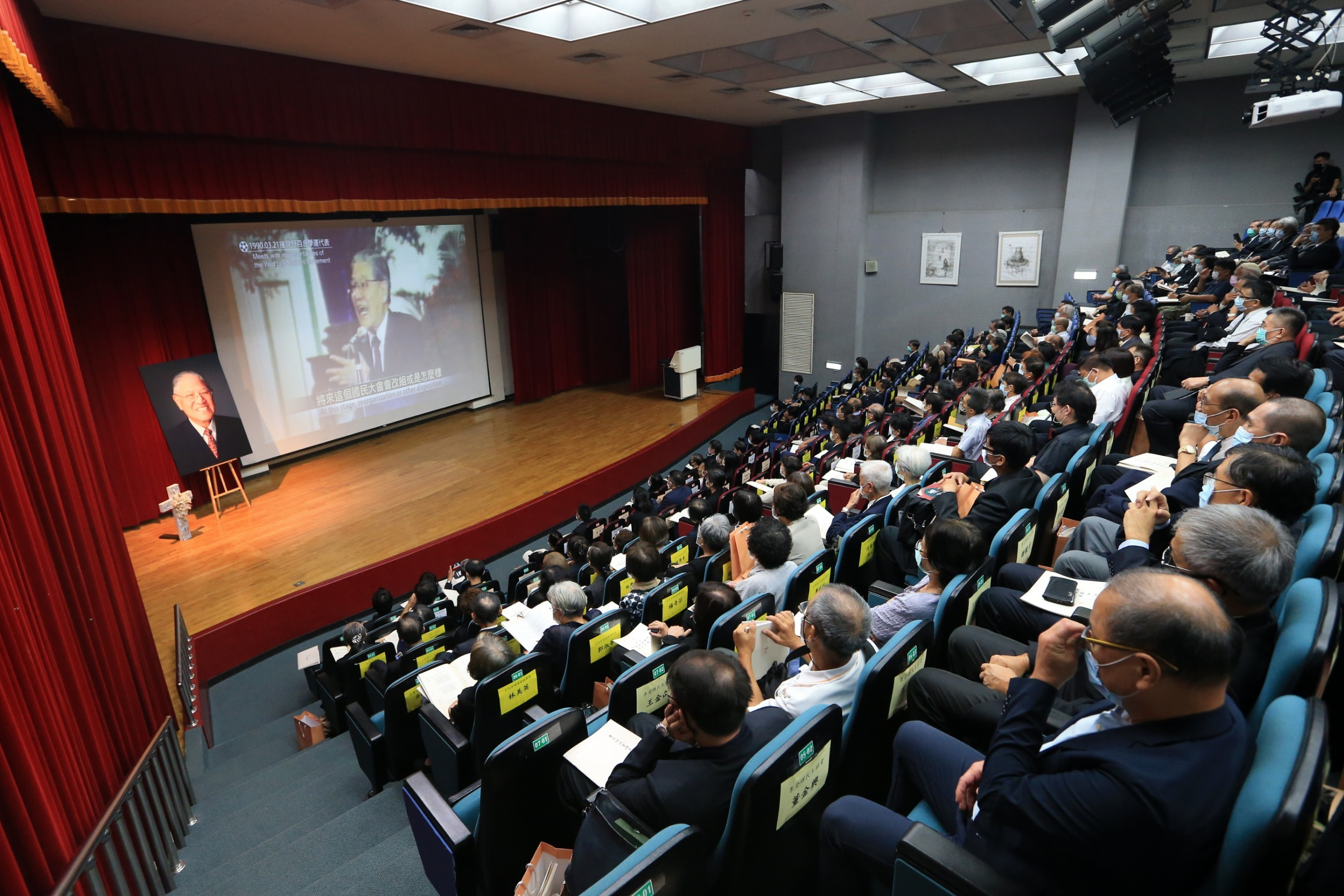
3rd Venue: Concert hall, Tamkang Senior High School

President Tsai bestowed Lee with praise and commendation by decree, the certificate of which was received by Lee's older daughter Anna. In Tsai's speech, she credited Lee as "Mr. Democracy", recalled Lee's contribution to the foundation of democratisation and localisation of Taiwan during his 12-year presidency, and vowed that the Taiwanese would "continue along the path of democracy, freedom, diversity and openness". Vice President Lai and heads of five government branches then draped the national flag over Lee's casket.

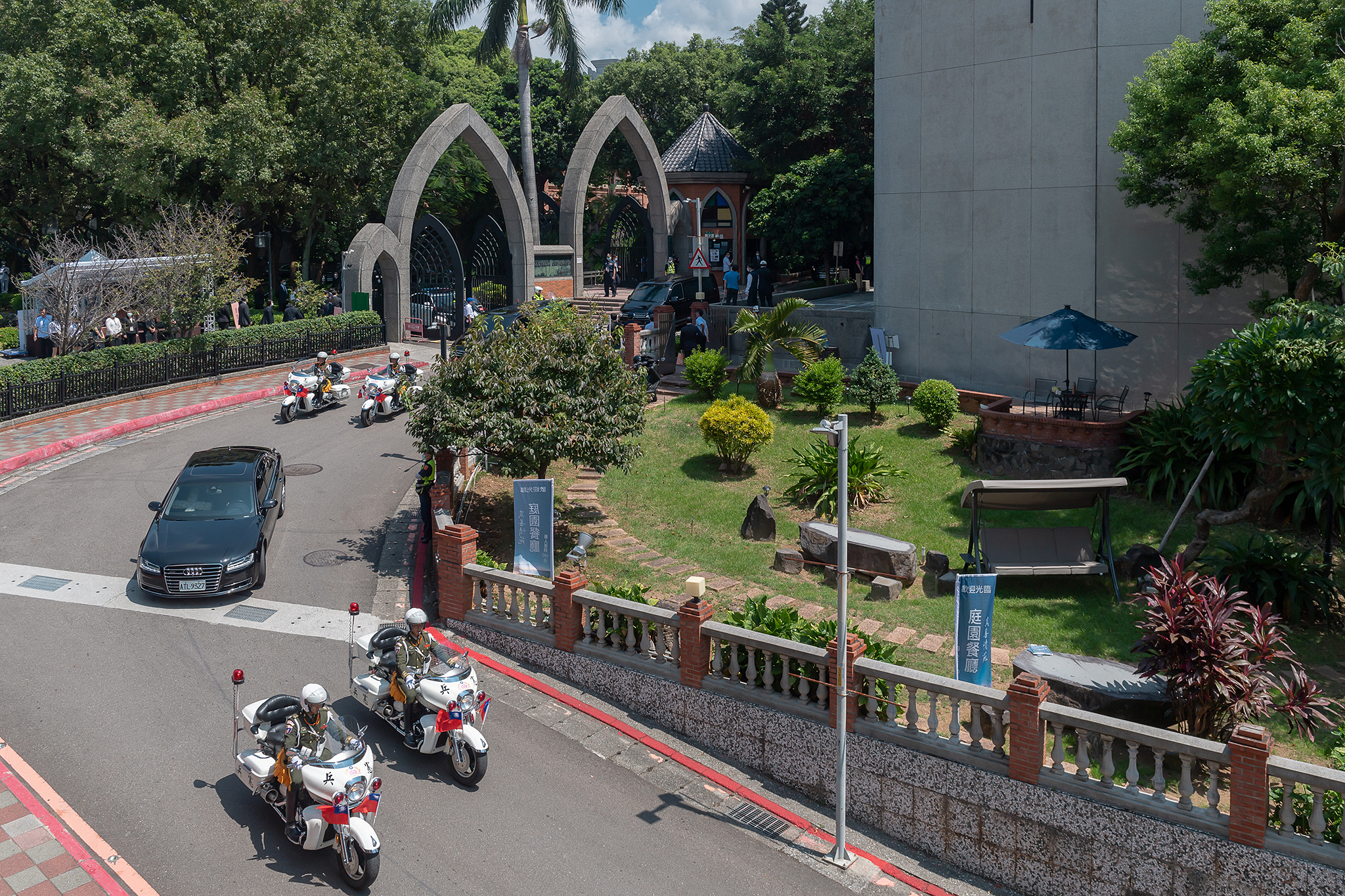
The hearse arriving at Aletheia University

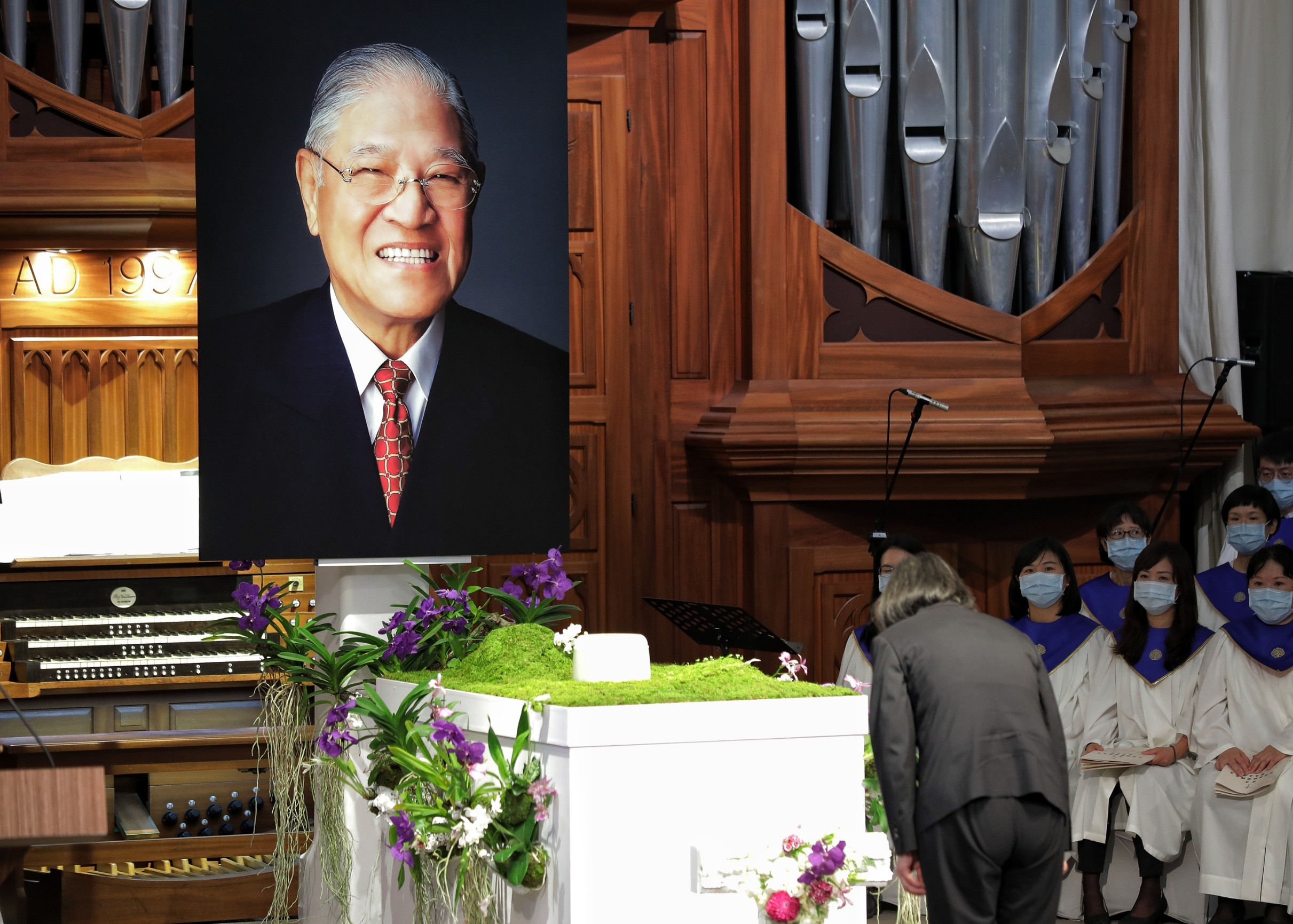
President Tsai bowing to Lee's casket

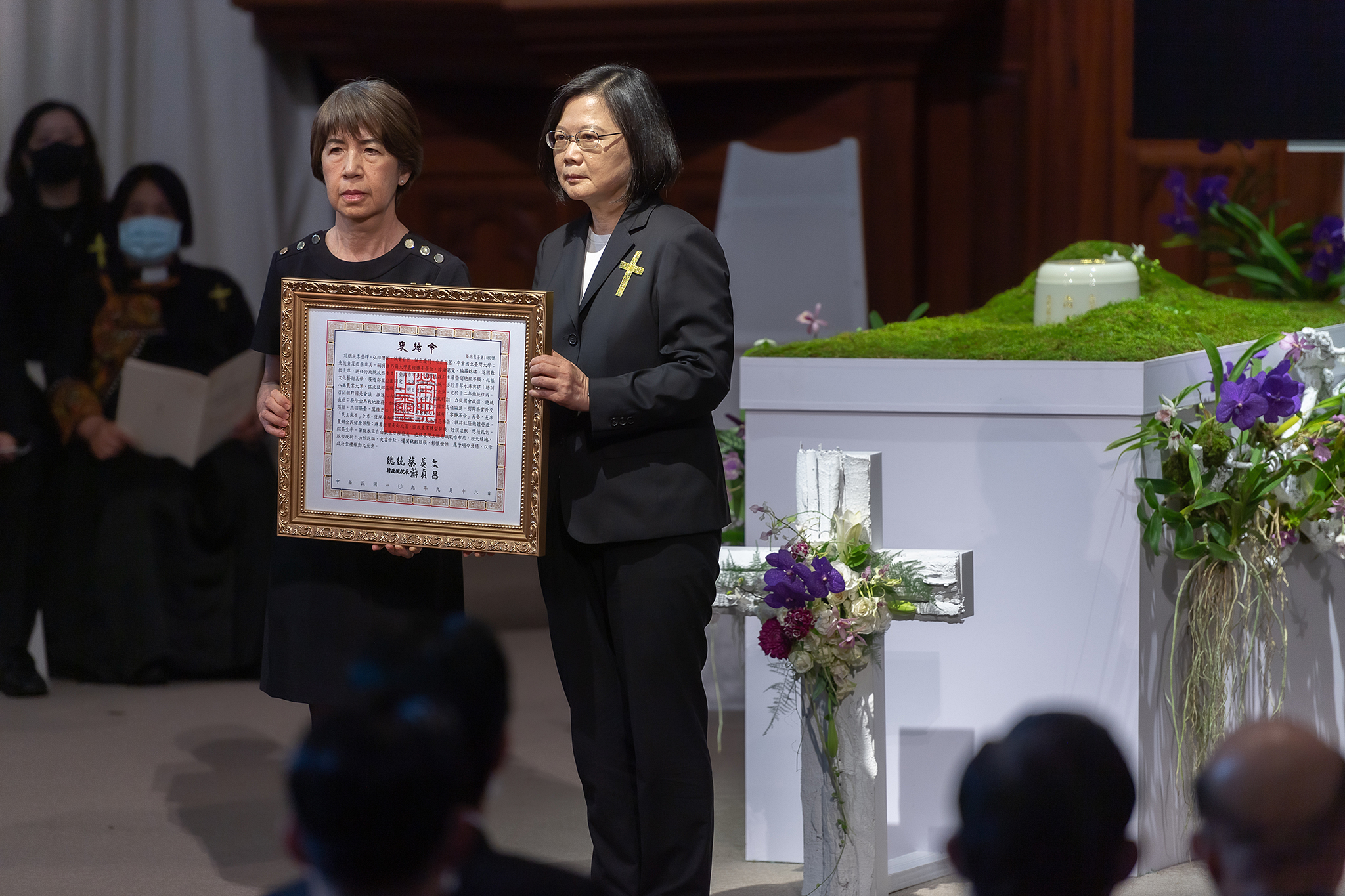
President Tsai bestowing praise and commendation

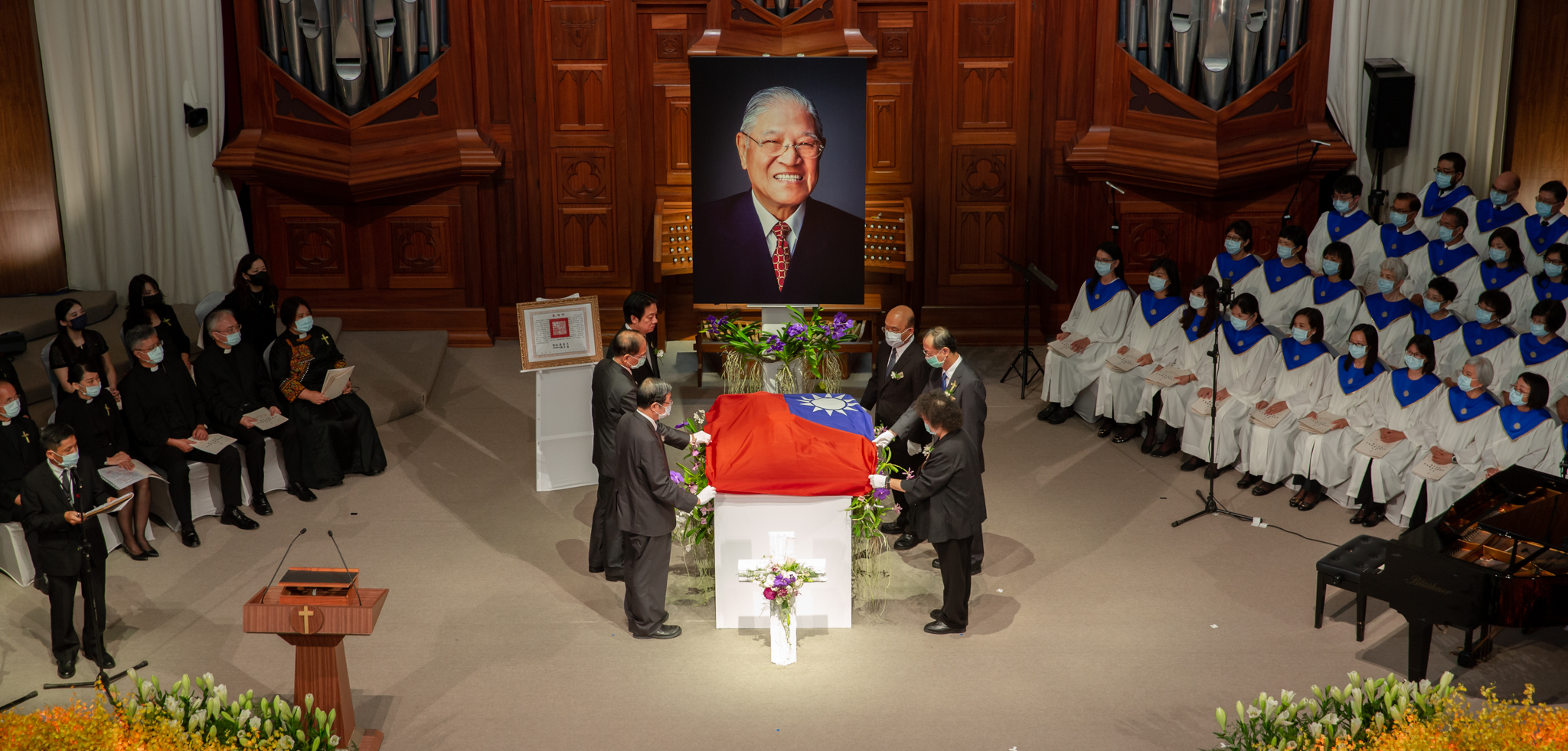
Draping of the national flag on the casket

Around 1000 guests attended the 2.5-hour service, among whom were Lee's family members, the members of the funeral committee and foreign guests, including Keith J. Krach, US Under Secretary of State and Yoshiro Mori, former prime minister of Japan. Hiroyasu Izumi, chief representative of Japan–Taiwan Exchange Association Taipei Office, read a eulogy on behalf of Shinzo Abe, the now former Japanese prime minister, who expressed respect to Lee for instilling universal values in Taiwan and forging the friendship between the two countries. In a pre-recorded video, the 14th Dalai Lama shared his memories with Lee and praised him for his commitment to democracy and freedom and preservation of Chinese culture in Taiwan.

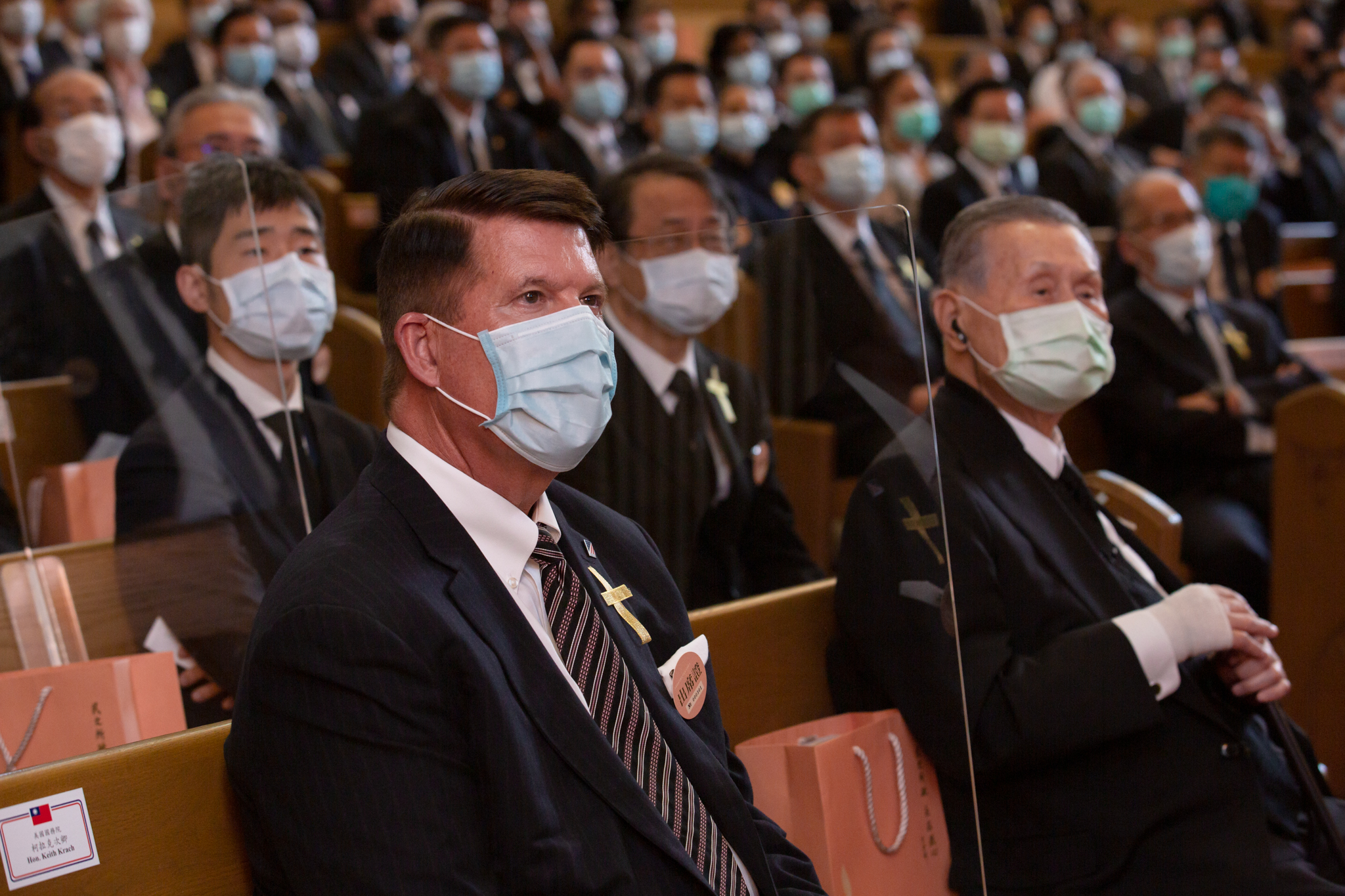
Keith J. Krach (l) and Yoshiro Mori (r) seated at the first row

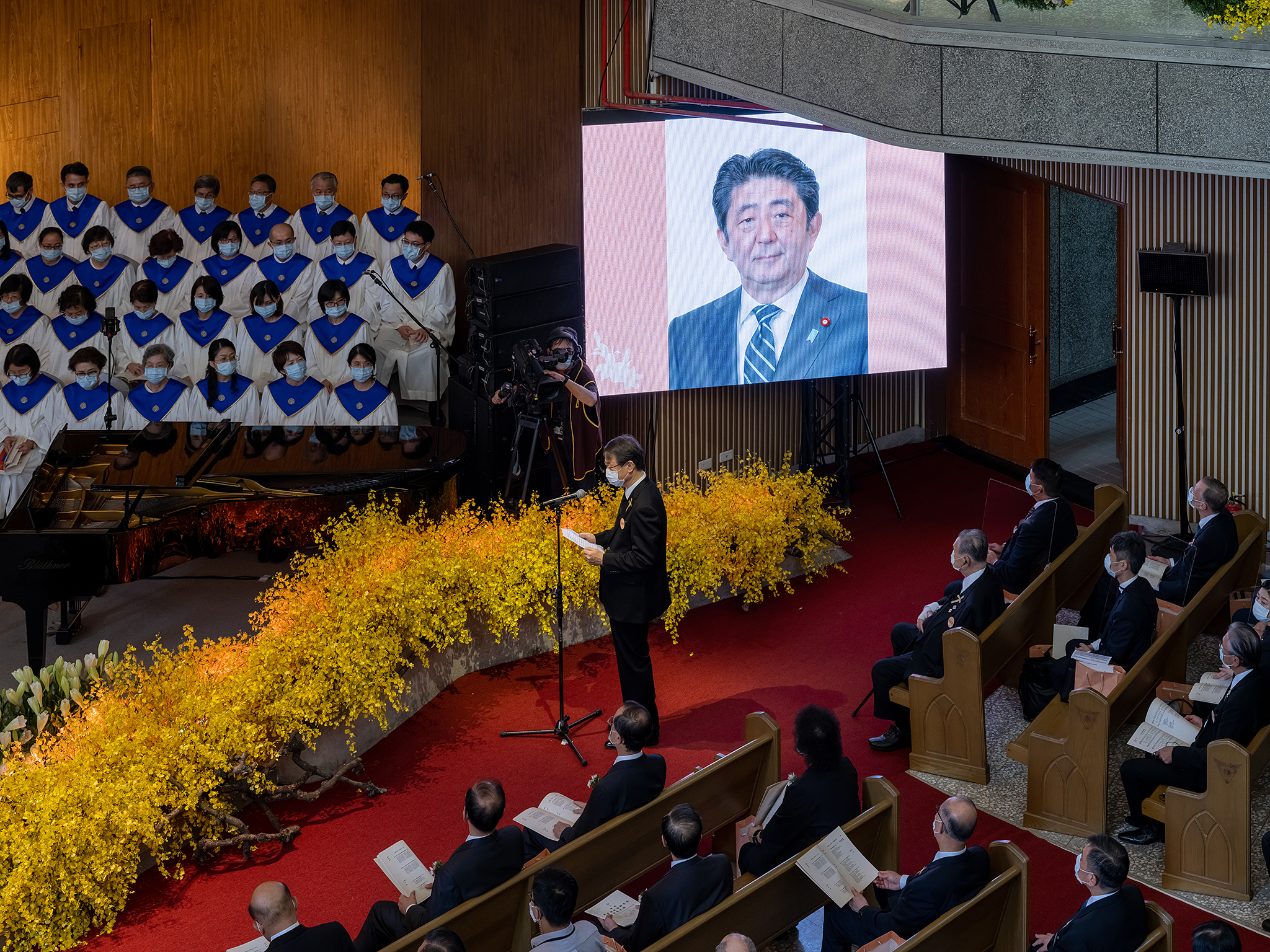
Eulogy from Shinzo Abe being read

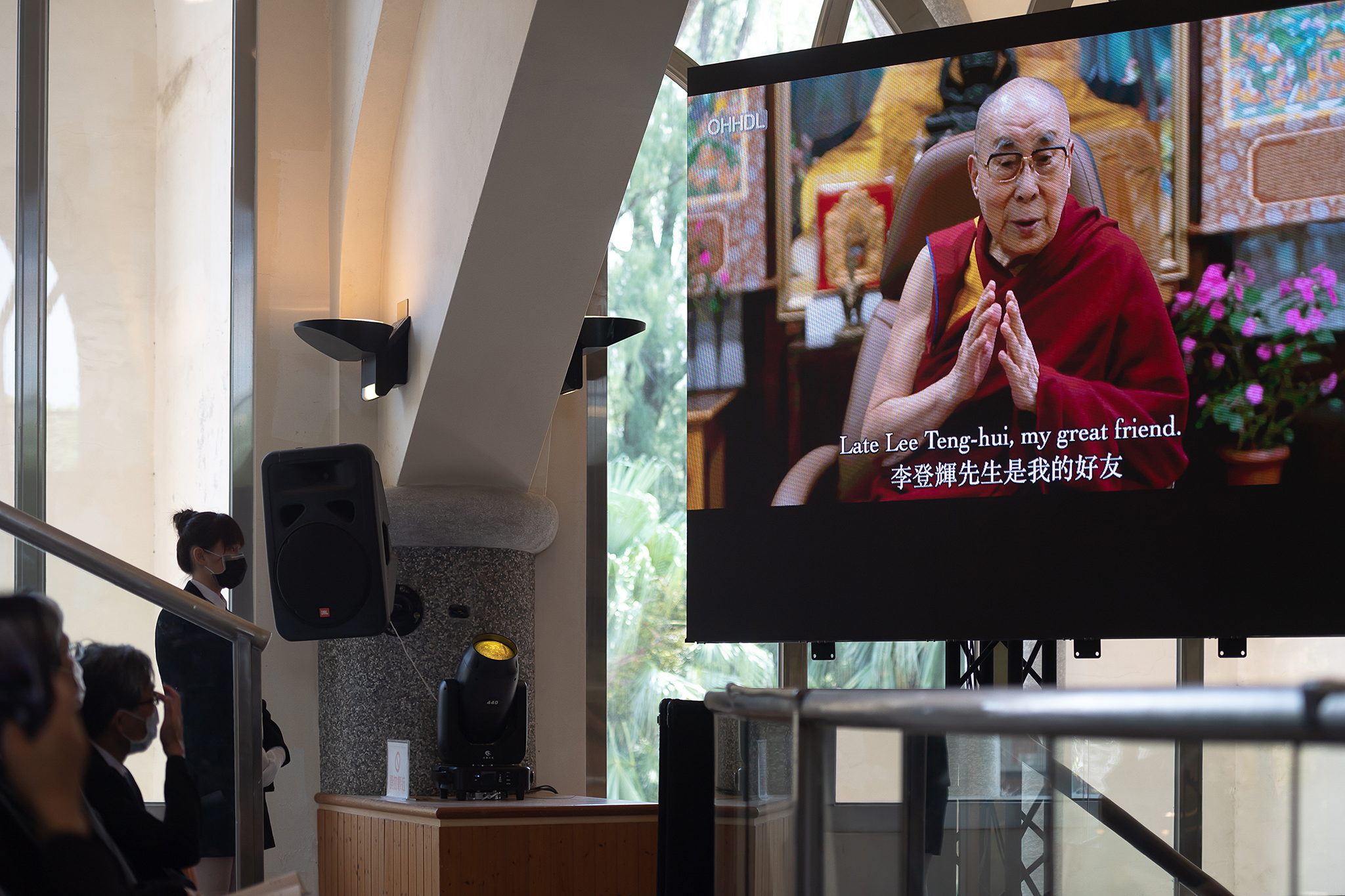
Pre-recorded video from the Dalai Lama

After the service, the hearse received a 21-gun salute from the Ministry of National Defense and made a stop at Tamkang Senior High School, where Lee had studied. The headmaster and administration of the school bowed three times and offered flower bouquets to the hearse. Afterwards, the hearse made a symbolic lap around the school library before returning to Lee's residence.

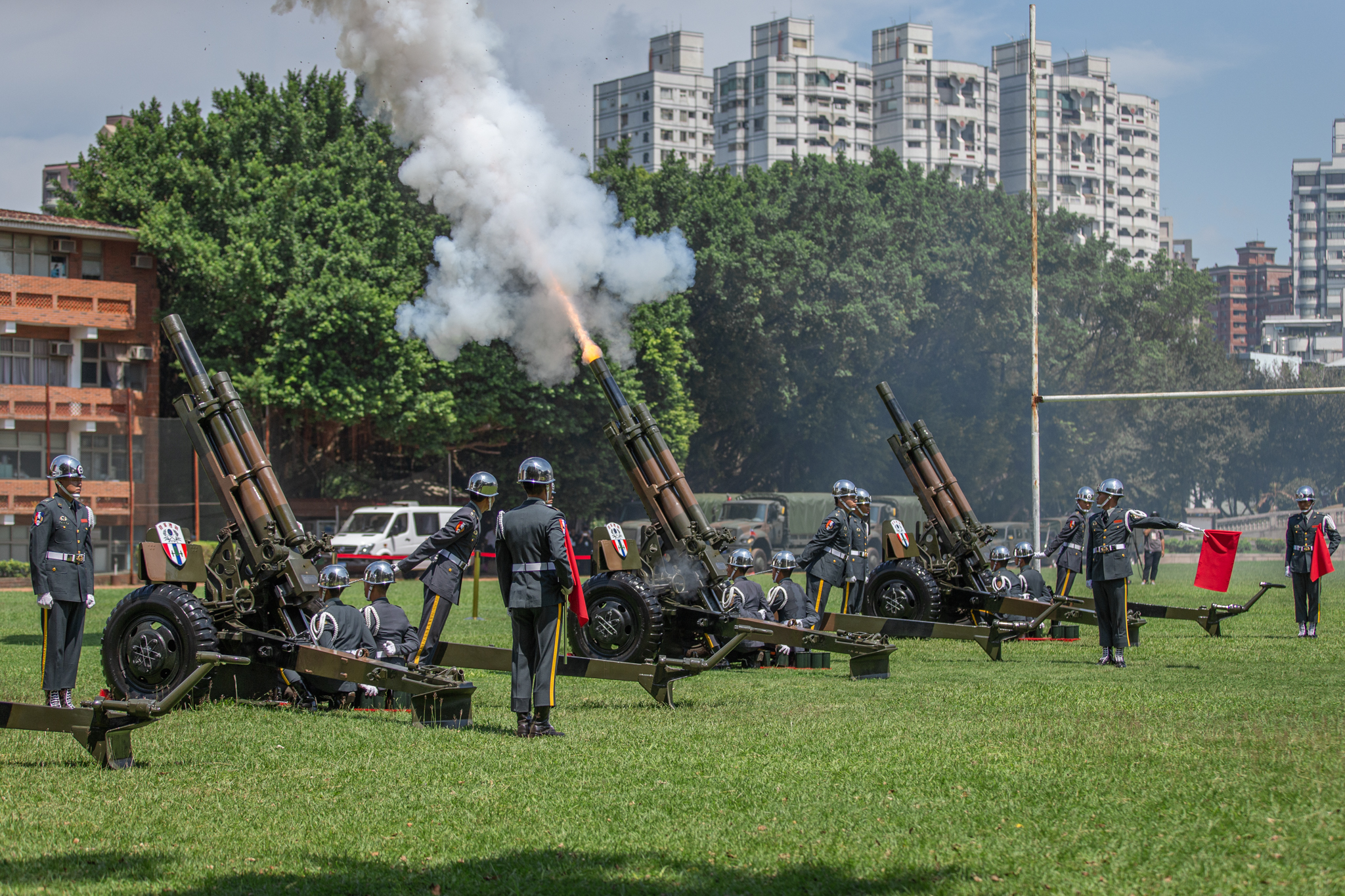
21-gun salute

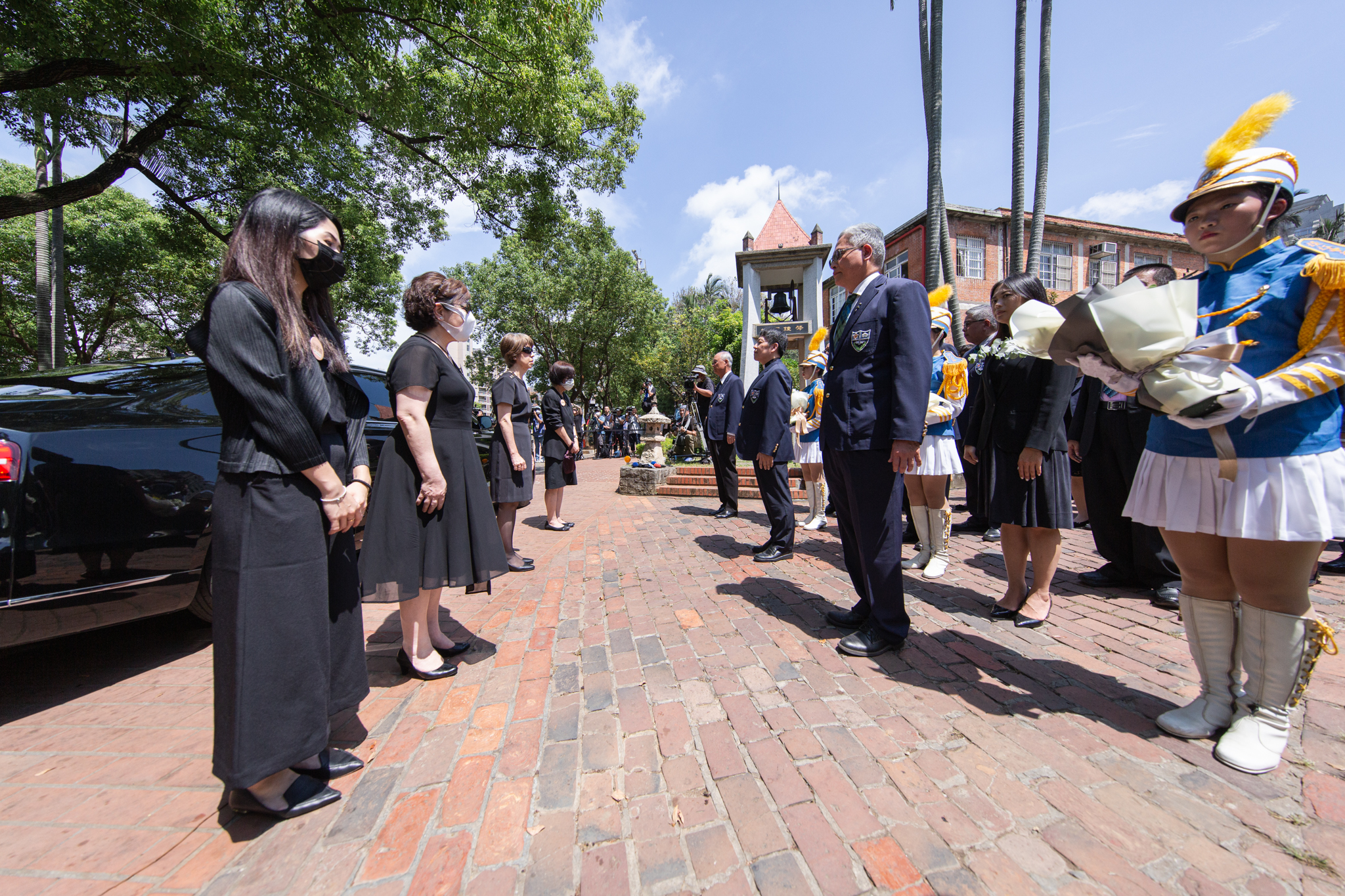
School administration offering condolences

=== Burial ===
The burial ceremony was held on 7 October at the Special Honour Zone of the Wu Chih-shan Military Cemetery in Xizhi District, New Taipei City. Following the wish of the family, the ceremony was not open to public, with only family members and top level government officials in attendance. The national flags at government and public facilities were flown at half-mast on that day.

At around 8:20 am, Lee's family members, with Lee's granddaughter Kun-yi and grandson-in-law carrying the cremation urn and the portrait, departed from his family residence and reached the military cemetery an hour later. They were greeted by President Tsai, Vice President Lai, Presidential Office Secretary-General David Lee and Deputy Secretary-General Lee Chun-yi, Interior Minister Hsu Kuo-yung and Defense Minister Yen Teh-fa. The ceremony was officiated by Pastor Ng Chhun-seng and Elder Chueh Chang-meng of Che-lam Presbyterian Church. In Ng's sermon, he encouraged the Taiwanese people to be inspired by Lee's "Jade Mountain spirit" and to dedicate themselves to their home Taiwan. The interment was followed by a three-volley salute by the Military Police Honour Guard and the "Last Post" played by the military band.

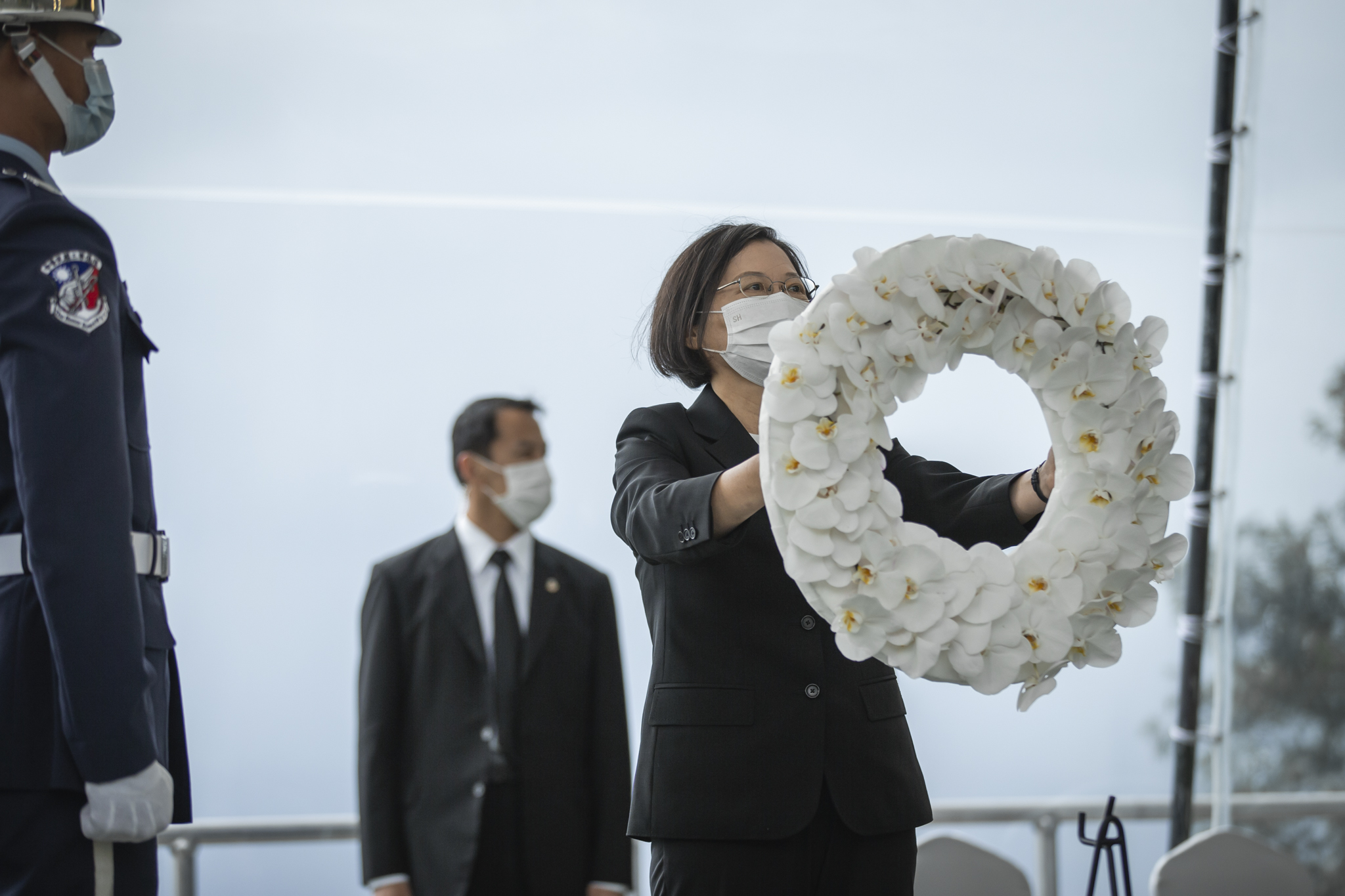
President Tsai offering wreath

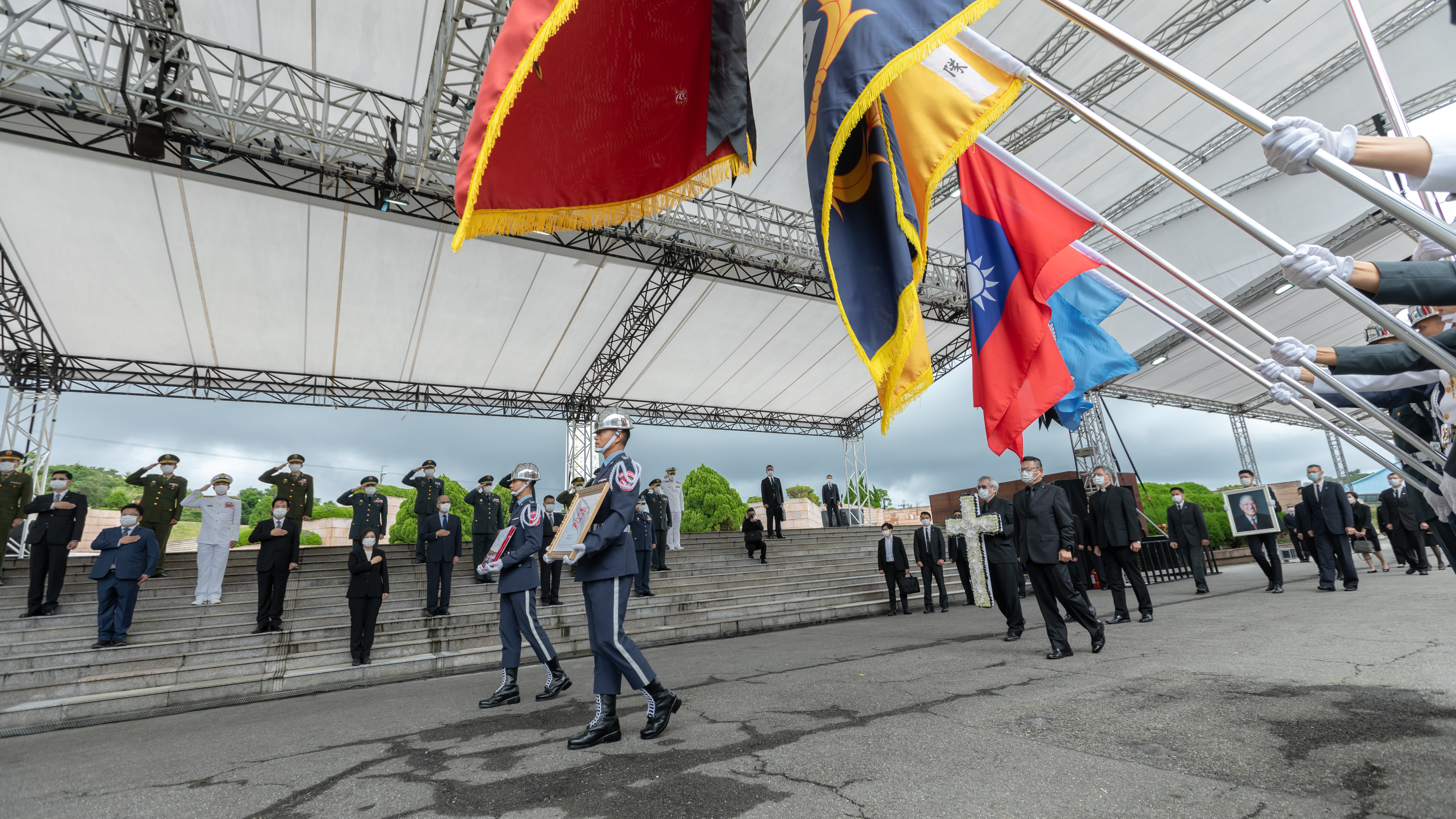
Burial procession saluted by Honour Guards of the Armed Force

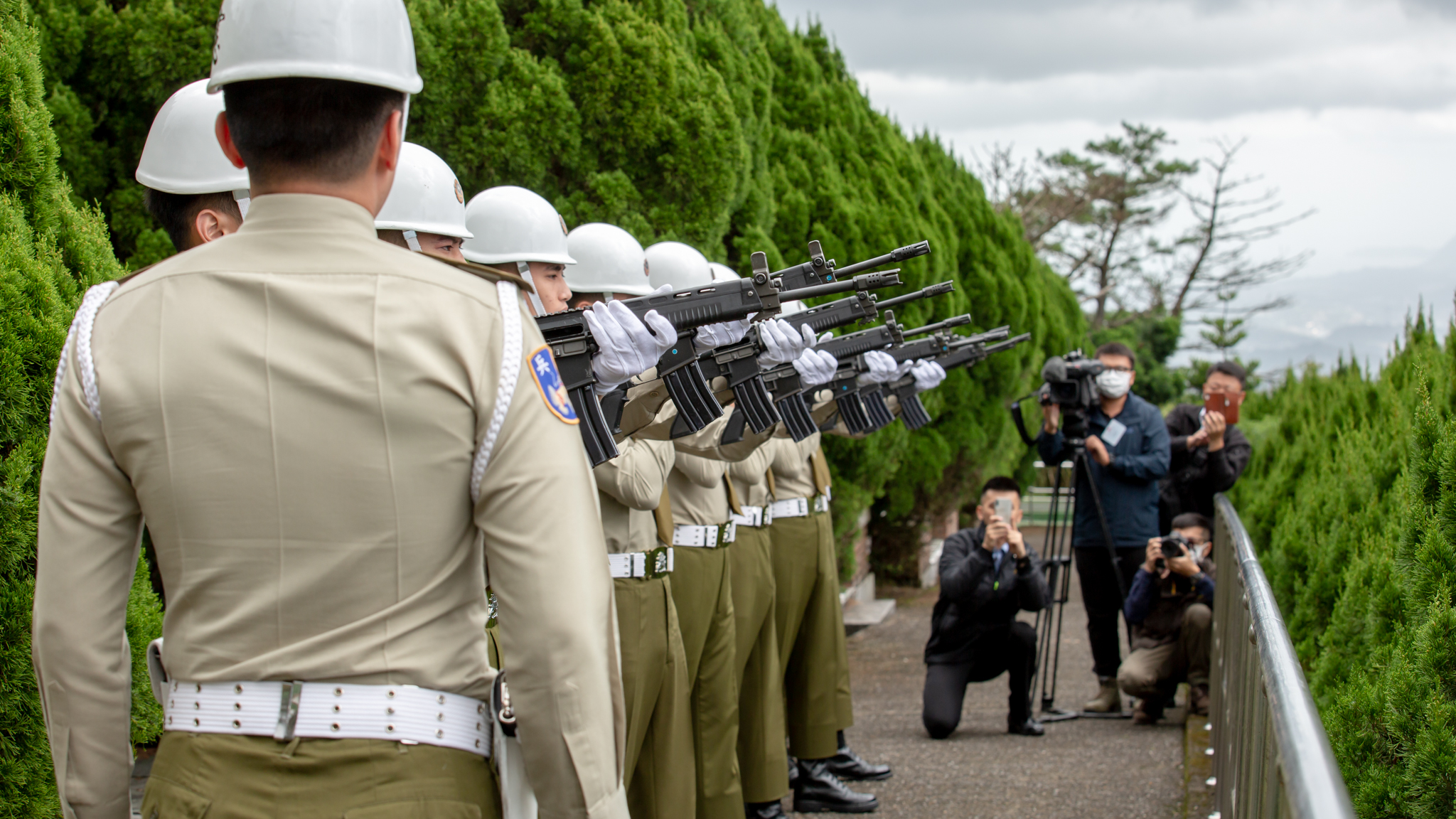
Three-volley salute

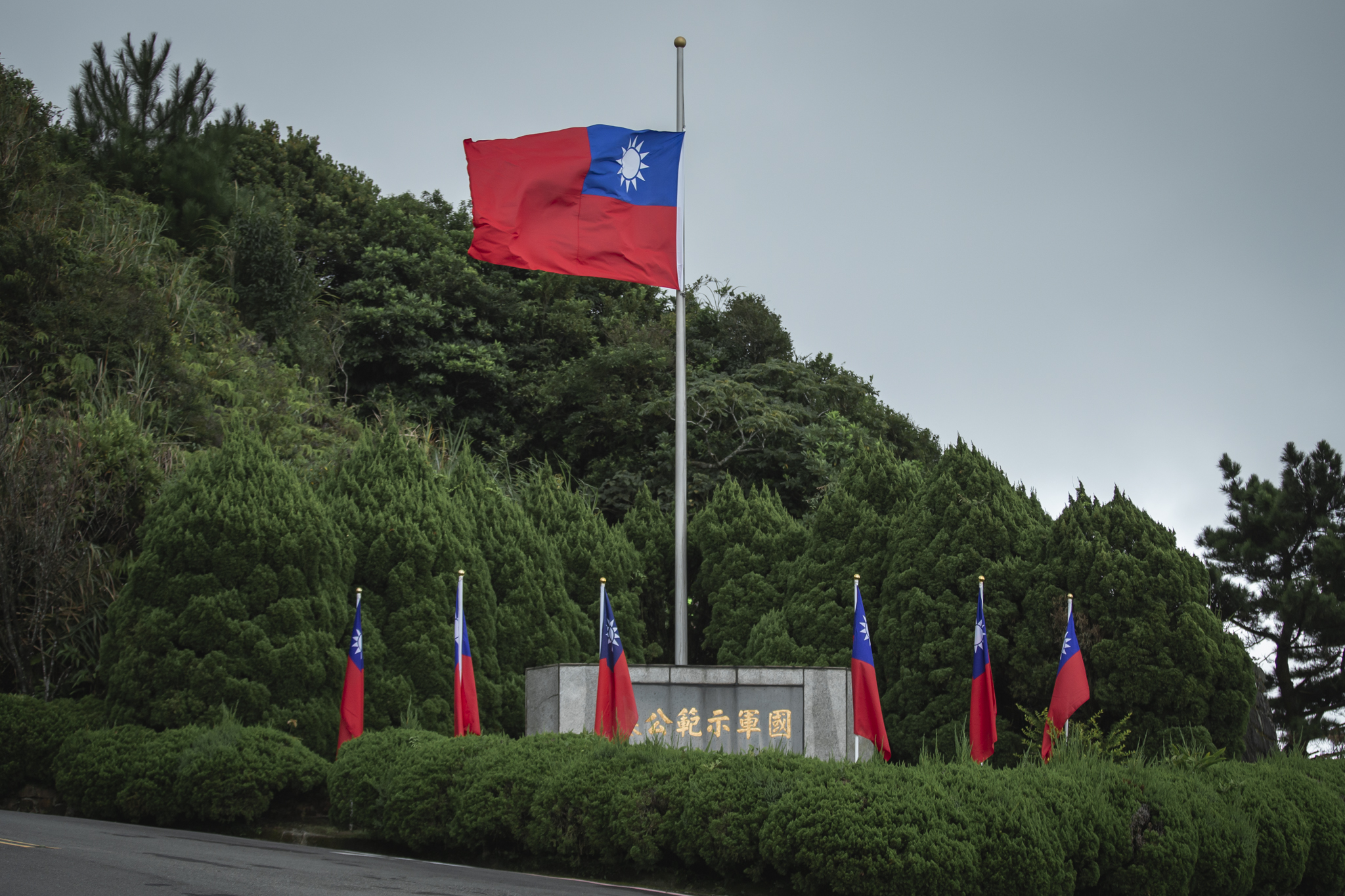
National flag flying at half-mast
