= Taipei Guest House =

Government-owned guest house in Taipei, Taiwan

- 臺北賓館
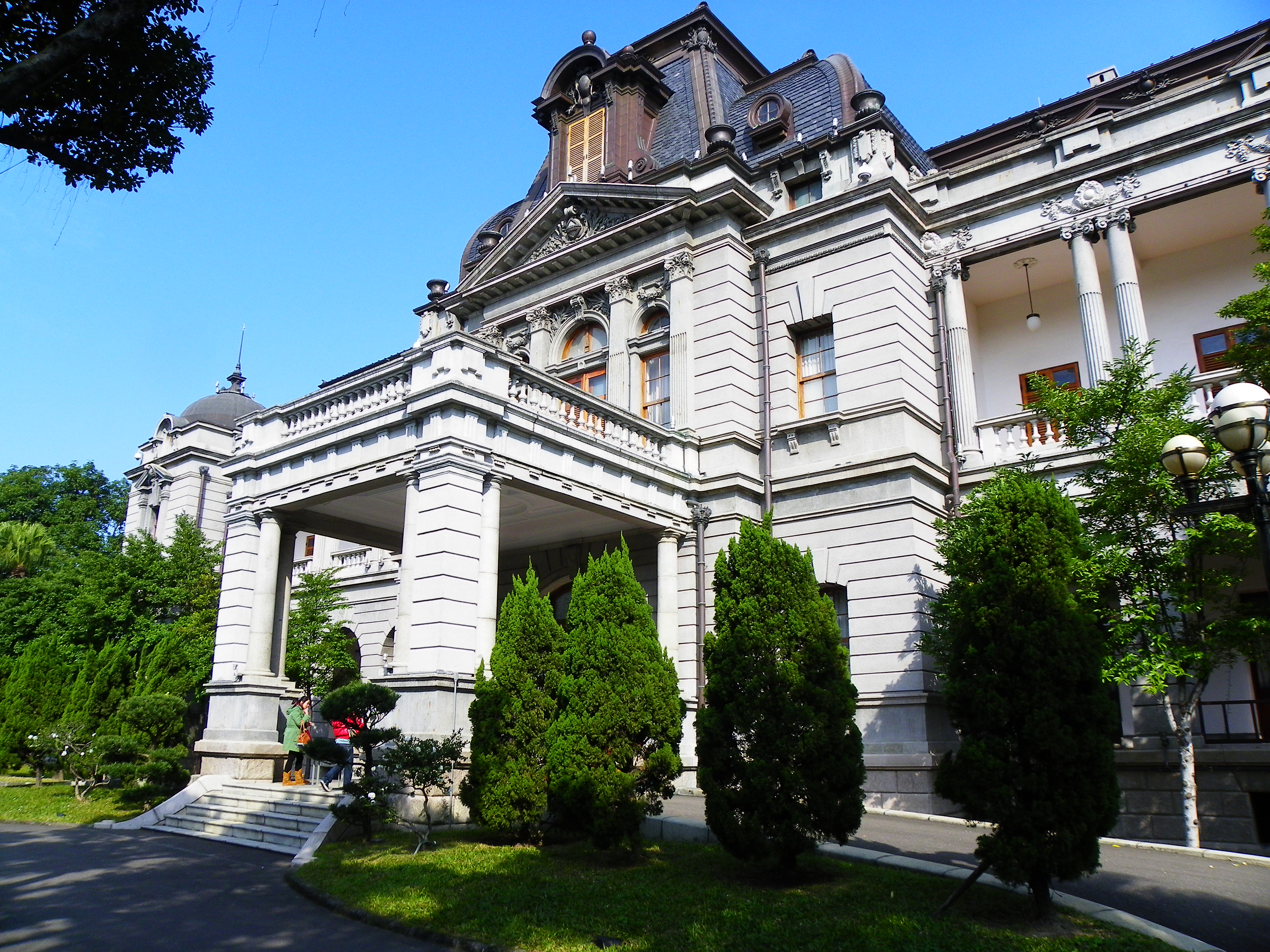
- Interactive map of the Taipei Guest House area

General information
- Location: Zhongzheng, Taipei, Taiwan
- Coordinates: 25.0401°N 121.5166°E
- Construction started: April 1899
- Completed: 26 September 1901
- Owner: Government of the Republic of China

Design and construction
- Architects: Dogo Fukuda, Ichiro Nomura

National monument of Taiwan
- Type: Residence
- Designated: 30 July 1998

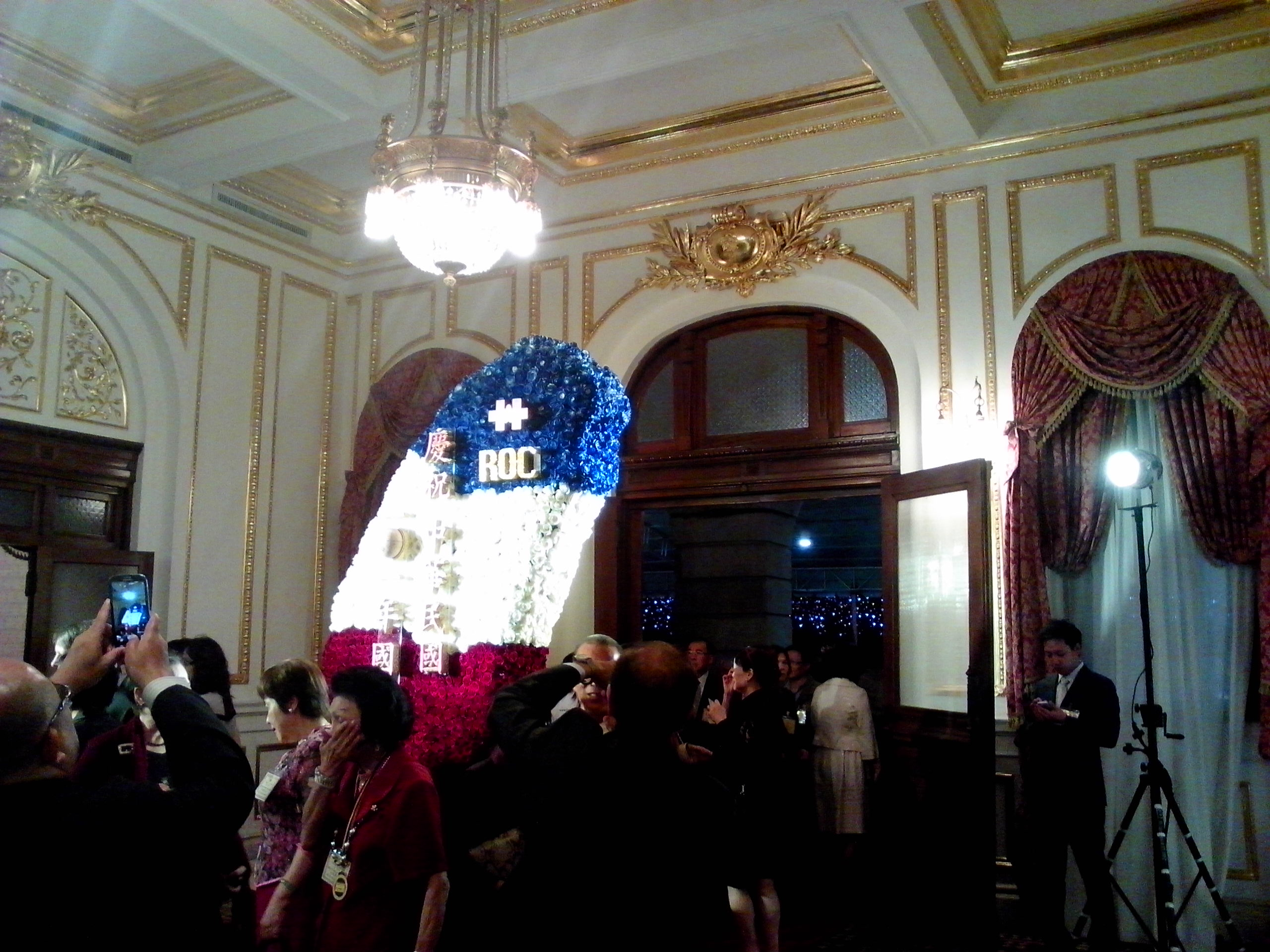
Building interior

The Taipei Guest House (traditional Chinese: 臺北賓館; simplified Chinese: 台北宾馆; pinyin: Táiběi Bīnguǎn; Pe̍h-ōe-jī: Tâi-pak Pin-koán) is the historical building located at 1 Ketagalan Boulevard, Bo'ai Special Zone, Zhongzheng District, Taipei, Taiwan. It is owned by the Government of the Republic of China and used as a state guest house for receiving state guests or celebration activities.

== History ==
Designed by Japanese architects Dōgo Fukuda and Ichiro Nomura, the structure was built from 1899 to 1901 and rebuilt by Matsunosuke Moriyama in 1911. Gotō Shinpei was responsible for maintaining its construction budget, and was recalled to Japan to meet with National Diet members after it was reported that funds set aside for the Taiwan Grand Shrine were being spent on the Taipei Guest House.

Until 1920, the Taipei Guest House was the residence of the Governor-General of Taiwan during the Japanese period, situated about 100 meters from the Office of the Governor-General of Taiwan (now the Presidential Building). Imperial members and heads of politics often visited here. Emperor Showa (Crown Prince Hirohito) also stayed here when visiting Taiwan. After Taiwan was handed over to the Republic of China, ROC Minister of Foreign Affairs George Yeh and Japanese Minister of Foreign Affairs Isao Kawada signed the Treaty of Taipei here in 1952.

In 1988, Taipei Guest House was designated by the government of Taiwan and administered by the Ministry of Foreign Affairs of Taiwan.

== Architecture ==
The main architecture of the building is concave shaped, having a roof in Mansard style and high Roman pillars, mainly in a style of French Second Empire palace buildings. Inside the building there is a resplendent suspension light decorated with crystal, baroque gold leaves and flowers and gold foil; outside the building there is a modern Japanese curtilage garden. Taipei Guest House is the representative work of Taiwanese buildings under Japanese rule, also called the most graceful baroque residence house.

Taipei Guest House is open to the public on the first Sunday of even-numbered months from 4 June 2006.

== Transportation ==
The building is accessible within walking distance south east of NTU Hospital Station Taipei Metro.

== See also ==
- Taipei Grand Hotel
- Zhongxing Guesthouse
- Taipei Futai Street Mansion

== Bibliography ==
- Kai, Krakias. "Elegant Estate". Taiwan Review 76(2026)1; pp. 36-41.
