= Taipei Futai Street Mansion =

- 臺北撫台街洋樓 / 大和町洋樓
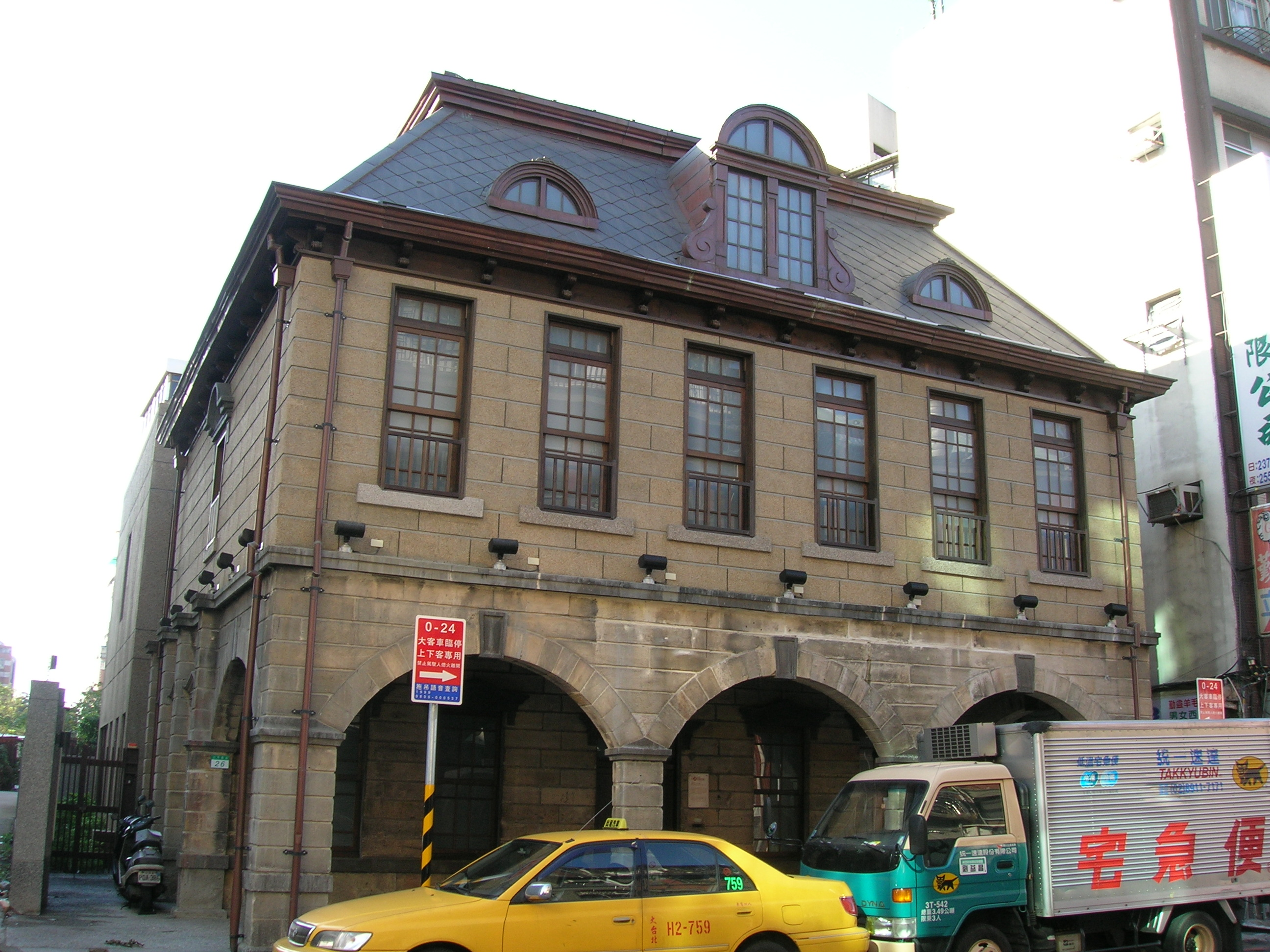
- Interactive map of the Taipei Futai Street Mansion area
- Former names: Takaishi Gumi Headquarters

General information
- Type: Historical building
- Architectural style: European baroque
- Location: Zhongzheng, Taipei, Taiwan
- Coordinates: 25°02′48.2″N 121°30′38.7″E
- Completed: 1910

The Taipei Futai Street Mansion (Chinese: 臺北撫臺街洋樓; pinyin: Táiběi Fǔtái Jiē Yánglóu), also called Yamato-chō Mansion (Japanese: 大和町洋樓), is the only existing historical and commercial building in Taipei, Taiwan. It is located at Yanping South Road No.26, Zhongzheng District and lies in the Bo'ai Special Zone as well. This mansion is owned by the Ministry of National Defense.

The building was constructed in 1910 the early years of the Japanese rule. It was the head office of Takaishi Gumi (高石組), a construction company founded in 1901. The mansion's architectural style was deeply influenced by the European baroque classical fashion at the time. The first floor arcades and columns was constructed by the kizingan stone (唭哩岸石), and the second floor has the most obvious external characteristics of the steep angular mansard roof with dormers.

The mansion is accessible by Taipei Metro. From Taipei Main Station, leave by Exit Z10 of the Station Front Metro Mall, or take Exit 6 from the Ximen Metro Mall at Ximen Station and walk 15 minutes to Yanping South Road. Taipei Futai Street Mansion is open to the public from Monday to Saturday 10:00 ~18:00 (Closed Sundays). Admission fee generally is free except special exhibition.

== See also ==
- Taiwan under Japanese rule
