= List of accidents and incidents involving the Boeing 707 =

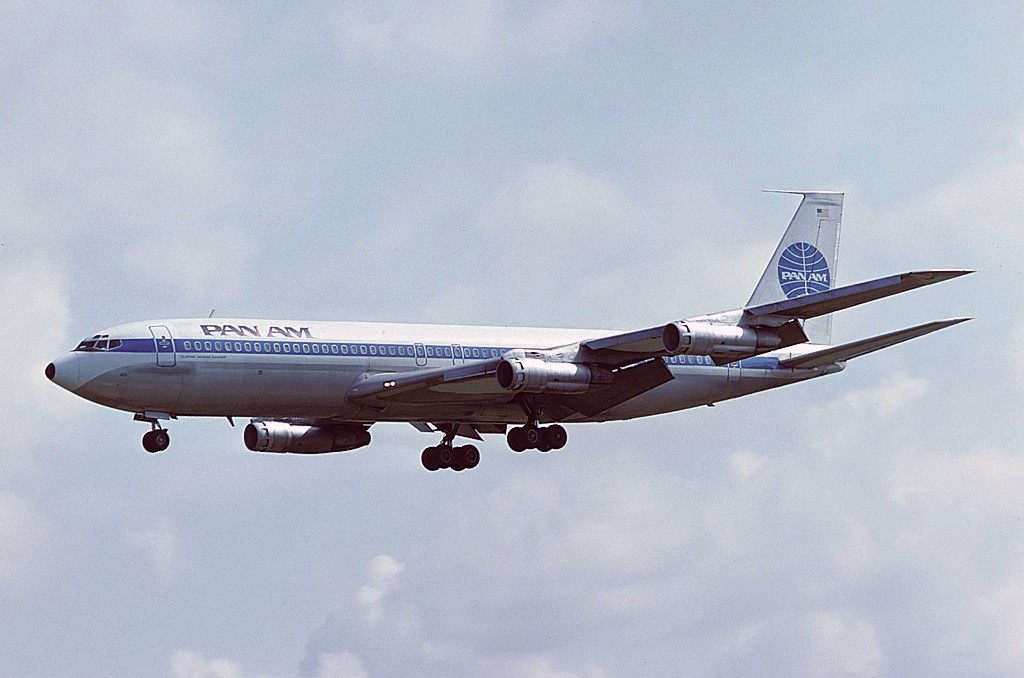
A Pan Am Boeing 707

Accidents involving the Boeing 707 and 720 family of jet airliners:

== 1950s ==
1959

- February 3: Pan Am Flight 115, was a commercial flight from Paris via London to New York City. At 22:05 GMT (16:05 EDT) on February 3, 1959, it was involved in one of the most significant jet upset incidents of the jet airliner age, over the North Atlantic near Newfoundland.
- August 15: American Airlines Flight 514, a 707-123 (N7514A, named Flagship Connecticut), crashed at Calverton, New York, United States, when it stalled during a training flight; five people were killed. This was the first crash of a 707.
- October 19: A Boeing 707-227 (N7071) crashed northeast of Arlington, Washington, while on an acceptance flight for Braniff International Airways. Four people were killed in the crash and four survived.

== 1960s ==
1961

- January 28: American Airlines Flight 1502, a 707-123 (N7502A, named Flagship Oklahoma) crashed at Montauk, New York, United States, after an unexplained loss of control while on a training flight; six were killed.
- February 15: Sabena Flight 548, a 707-320, crashed while on approach to Brussels Airport, Belgium. All 73 people were killed, including the U.S. Figure Skating team.
- July 27: Air France Flight 272, a 707-328 (F-BHSA, named Chateau de Versailles) crashed when take-off was aborted at Hamburg, West Germany, with no fatalities; the cause was not determined.
- August 3: Continental Airlines Flight 54 was hijacked from Los Angeles by two men, who demanded to be taken to Cuba. The plane would be destroyed in a suicide bombing the following year.
- December 4: A Lufthansa 720-030B (D-ABOK) crashed at Ebersheim, West Germany after an unexplained nose-dive while on a training flight, three killed.

1962

- March 1: American Airlines Flight 1, a 707-123B, crashed into Jamaica Bay after taking off from Idlewild Airport (now JFK Airport) while heading for Los Angeles International Airport. All 95 people on board died.
- May 22: Continental Airlines Flight 11, a 707-124, was destroyed by a bomb brought on board by a despondent passenger while en route from Chicago, Illinois, to Kansas City, Missouri. All 45 passengers and crew were killed, including the suicide bomber, Thomas Doty.
- June 3: Air France Flight 007, a 707-328 (F-BHSM), crashed while attempting to takeoff from Paris's Orly Airport. The crash killed 130 people aboard; two stewardesses survived. It was, at the time, the worst single-plane disaster.
- June 22: Air France Flight 117, a 707-328 (F-BHST), crashed into a hill while attempting to land at Pointe-à-Pitre, Guadeloupe, in the eastern Caribbean Sea. All 113 aboard were killed in the crash.
- November 27: Varig Flight 810, a 707-441 (PP-VJB) flying from Rio de Janeiro-Galeão to Lima was initiating an overshoot procedure at the suggestion of the control tower because it was too high, and proceeded to start another approach when it crashed into La Cruz peak, 8 miles away from Lima Airport. Possibly, a misinterpretation of navigation instruments occurred. All 97 passengers and crew aboard died.

1963

- February 12: Northwest Orient Airlines Flight 705, a 720-051B, crashed in the Everglades after breaking up in severe turbulence, with 43 killed.
- December 8: Pan Am Flight 214, a 707-121, crashed outside Elkton, Maryland, during a severe electrical storm, with a loss of all 81 passengers and crew. The Boeing 707, registered as N709PA, was on the final leg of a San Juan–Baltimore–Philadelphia flight.

1964

- April 7: Pan Am Flight 212, a 707-139 (N779PA), was damaged beyond repair after overrunning the runway at New-York-JFK.
- July 15: A Lufthansa 720-023B (D-ABOP) crashed near Ansbach, West Germany, after losing control and breaking up while on a training flight, with three killed.
- November 23: TWA Flight 800, a 707-331 (N769TW), crashed at Rome-Fiumicino, Italy. The aircraft hit a roller during an aborted take-off after a thrust reverser malfunctioned; 49 were killed.

1965

- May 20: PIA Flight 705, a 720-040B, crashed near Cairo, Egypt, after an unexplained descent, with 121 killed. It is the worst-ever accident involving the 720.
- June 28: Pan Am Flight 843, a 707-321B, suffered an uncontained engine failure on take-off from San Francisco International Airport. Despite the loss of part of a wing, a successful emergency landing was made at Travis Air Force Base. All 153 people on board survived uninjured.
- July 1: Continental Airlines Flight 12, a 707-124 N70773 overran the runway and crashed at Kansas City, Missouri, United States, with no casualties.
- August 21: A Middle East Airlines 720-047B is damaged beyond repair by shelling at Beirut, Lebanon.
- September 17: Pan Am Flight 292, a 707-121B, crashed into the side of a mountain in a storm on the island of Montserrat, killing all 30 passengers and crew on board.
- December 4: TWA Flight 42, a 707-131B, collided with a Eastern Air Lines Flight 853, a L-749 Constellation. The 707 make an emergency landing, injuring a flight attendant, while the L-749 makes a force crash-landing, killing 3 passengers and the captain.

1966

- January 24: Air India Flight 101, a 707-437, crashed into Glacier des Bossons on the southwest face of Mont Blanc in the French Alps. All 106 passengers and 11 crew were killed.
- March 5: BOAC Flight 911, a 707-436 en route from Tokyo to Hong Kong, encountered clear-air turbulence close to Mount Fuji; the sudden, violent gusting caused the vertical stabilizer to detach from the aircraft, following which the aircraft entered an uncontrolled dive. The 707 progressively broke up as a result of aerodynamic over-stressing of the airframe, then struck the ground near the foot of the mountain. All 124 passengers and crew on board died.

1967

- November 6: TWA Flight 159, a 707-131, was damaged beyond repair at Covington, Kentucky, United States following an aborted take-off, with one killed.

1968

- January 9: Middle East Airlines Flight 272, a 720-060B (ET-AAG), landed nose gear-first at Beirut, Lebanon; the nose gear folded back and a small fire developed, but was extinguished; the aircraft burned out 30 minutes later when the fire restarted; no casualties occurred. The aircraft was operating for Ethiopian Airlines.
- February 7: Canadian Pacific Air Lines Flight 322, a 707-138B (N791SA), operated by Standard Airways, crashed at Vancouver, British Columbia, Canada. The aircraft hit airport buildings when it failed to stop after landing, killing a flight attendant and an airport employee.
- March 5: Air France Flight 212, a 707-328, crashed at Pointe-a-Pitre, Guadeloupe. All 63 passengers and crew on board were killed.
- April 8: BOAC Flight 712, a 707-465, suffered engine failure on take-off from London Heathrow Airport followed by an engine fire. The plane made an emergency landing back at the airport, but an explosion in the port wing caused the plane to catch fire. Four passengers and a flight attendant were killed and 122 escaped.
- April 20: South African Airways Flight 228, a 707-344C, crashed shortly after take-off from Windhoek, Namibia. The crew used a flap retraction sequence from the 707-B series on the newly delivered 707-C, which retracted the flaps in larger increments for that stage of the flight, leading to a loss of lift at 600 ft (180 m) above ground level. The inquiry blamed the crew for not observing their flight instruments when they had no visual reference.
- June 13: Pan Am Flight 1, a 707-321 (N798PA, named Clipper Caribbean) crashed at Calcutta, India, due to crew and instrument errors, with six killed.
- July 13: A Sabena 707-329 (OO-SJK) crashed at Lagos, Nigeria, after an unexplained descent, with seven killed.
- July 23: El Al Flight 426 was hijacked by three men of the Popular Front for the Liberation of Palestine.
- September 7: A Varig 707-341 (PP-VJR) was destroyed in a hangar fire at Rio de Janeiro-Galeao, Brazil, with no casualties.
- November 8: An Olympic Airways flight out of Paris was hijacked by two Italian men, who carried a handgun and a grenade. The hijackers forced the crew to hand out pamphlets to the passengers. The hijackers claimed to be members of the International Command for Greece. The two men later surrendered.
- November 24: Pan Am Flight 281 was hijacked by four men after take-off from JFK International Airport. The plane was diverted to Cuba.
- December 12: Pan Am Flight 217, a 707-321B, en route to Caracas, Venezuela, crashed into the Caribbean Sea. All 51 passengers and crew on board died. City lights may have caused an optical illusion that affected the pilots.
- December 26: Pan Am Flight 799, a 707-321C, a cargo flight, crashed shortly after takeoff, killing all 3 on board.
- December 28: A Middle East Airlines 707-3B4C (OD-AFC) was destroyed by fire at Beirut, Lebanon. The aircraft was one of 14 (a 707, DC-6, C-54, Vickers VC.10, Vickers Viscount 720, two DC-7s, two Convair 990s, two Sud Caravelles, and three de Havilland Comets) destroyed in a raid by Israeli forces.

1969

- June 17: TWA Flight 154 was hijacked by William Lee Brent, who diverted the plane to Cuba. He died in Cuba in 2006.
- July 28: TWA Flight 5787, a 707-331 (N787TW), crashed at Pomona, New Jersey, United States, due to loss of control after the hydraulic system was shut off, and five were killed.
- August 29: TWA Flight 840 was hijacked by two PFLP members, Leila Khaled and Salim Issawai. No casualties occurred, though the plane was damaged and two passengers were held hostage for a month.
- October 8: An Aerolíneas Argentinas flight was hijacked shortly before arriving in Santiago, Chile. The hijacker diverted the plane to Cuba. After the hijacker deboarded, the plane flew to Miami.
- October 31: TWA Flight 85 en route from Los Angeles to San Francisco was hijacked by 19-year-old US Marine Raffaele Minichiello. All passengers, including the band Harpers Bizarre, and three stewardesses were released in Denver. The hijacker, three pilots, and a stewardess continued on to JFK Airport in New York, where two pilots were added for the overseas flight. The plane refueled in Bangor, Maine, and Shannon, Ireland, before continuing to Rome, Italy. In Rome, Minichiello took the chief of the airport police as a hostage and departed in a car, from which he slipped away, but was caught shortly thereafter. Minichiello intended to visit his dying father in Italy. Italy did not extradite Minichiello and he served only 18 months in jail. Covering 6,900 miles, this was the longest hijacking in history.
- November 4: Varig Flight 911 was hijacked by six men who demanded to be taken to Cuba.
- November 29: A hijacker on Varig Flight 827 demanded to be taken to Cuba.
- December 1: Pan Am Flight 812, a 707-321 (N892PA), crashed at take-off from Sydney, Australia, following a bird strike in the number-two engine and collapse of the nose gear, with no fatalities. The aircraft was repaired and put back in service two months later. This plane was destroyed in an accident 41 years later while serving as a tanker.
- December 2: TWA Flight 54 was hijacked by a man demanding to be taken to Cuba.
- December 4: Air France Flight 212 crashed shortly after takeoff at Caracas, Venezuela. All 62 people on board were killed.
- December 12: An Ethiopian Airlines flight was by hijacked by two Yemenis. The first Yemeni entered the cockpit with a pistol and demanded the plane be diverted to Aden. The pilot told the hijacker that the plane needed to refuel in Rome, but the plane was not allowed to land there. Shortly, a security guard shot and killed the hijacker and his knife-wielding accomplice.

== 1970s ==
1970

- April 22: A Trans World Airlines 707-131 (N743TW) was destroyed by fire at Indianapolis, Indiana, United States.
- September 6: Trans World Airlines Flight 741, was hijacked by terrorists from the Popular Front for the Liberation of Palestine along with four others as a part of the Dawson's Field hijackings. There were two 707 aircraft involved, one operating for El Al.
- September 12: Trans World Airlines 707-331 was damaged beyond repair at el Khana, Jordan.
- September 15: A Trans World Airlines flight flying over Salinas was hijacked by a man with a gun and demanded to be taken to North Korea. When the plane landed in San Francisco, 35 passengers were released. A sky marshal shot and injured the hijacker.
- November 30: A Trans World Airlines 707-373C (N790TW) crashed on takeoff at Tel Aviv, Israel after a runway collision with an Israeli Air Force Boeing 377; both aircraft burned out, and two on the ground were killed.

1971

- January 23: An Air India 707-437 (VT-DJI) was damaged beyond repair at Bombay, India. It overran on take-off and was destroyed by fire.
- March 31: Western Air Lines Flight 366, a 720-047B (N3166), crashed at Ontario, California, United States, after control was lost during a three-engine ILS approach while on a training flight, and five were killed.
- May 29: Pan Am Flight 442 was hijacked to Cuba.
- July 2: Braniff Flight 14, a Boeing 707 flying from Acapulco to New York with 102 passengers and a crew of eight, was hijacked on approach to a refueling stop in San Antonio, Texas. The ordeal lasted 43 hours across Texas, Mexico, Peru, and Brazil, and ended happily in Argentina. After a refueling stop in Monterrey, the hijackers released flight attendants Jeanette Eatman Crepps, Iris Kay Williams, and Anita Bankert Mayer and all of the passengers. The remaining crew of Captain Dale Bessant, Bill Wallace, Phillip Wray, and flight attendants Ernestina Garcia and Margaret Susan Harris flew on to Lima. The hijackers, a U.S. Navy deserter named Robert Jackson and his Guatemalan lady friend, demanded and got a ransom of $100,000 and wanted to go to Algeria. The Bessant crew was released, one by one, and replaced by a volunteer crew of Captain Al Schroeder, Bill Mizell, Bob Williams, and navigator Ken McWhorter. Two Lima-based employees, Delia Arizola and Clorinda Ontaneda, volunteered to board the flight. Clorinda had been attending college classes, something she did regularly during her off days from flying. Delia had been retired 6 months, but still offered her services. The 707 left for Rio and planned to refuel, but the hijacker forced them on to Buenos Aires. The long flight and fatigue took its toll and the hijackers gave up. It was a record for long-distance hijacking, over 7,500 miles.
- July 25: Pan Am Flight 6005, a 707-321C (N461PA, named Clipper Rising Sun) crashed at Manila, Philippines, due to poor CRM and a premature descent, four killed.
- December 15: A Pakistan International Airlines 707-340 crashed at Ürümqi in Sinkiang Province, China.
- December 24: Northwest Airlines Flight 734 was hijacked. The hijacker demanded a ransom.
- December 26: American Airlines Flight 47 was hijacked.

1972

- January 29: TWA Flight 2, Los Angeles to New York, was hijacked by con man and bank robber Garrett Trapnell while over Chicago. Trapnell demanded $306,800 in cash (to recoup the loss of a recent court case), the release of Angela Davis (as well as that of a friend of his who was also imprisoned), and clemency from President Richard Nixon. The FBI was able to retake the aircraft during a crew switch at Kennedy Airport; Trapnell was shot and wounded, and no one else was hurt. Trapnell's hijacking came after a string of domestic incidents and resulted in an overhaul of flight procedures by the Nixon administration, procedures that remained in place until the September 11, 2001, hijackings. Trapnell and unrelated hijacker Martin J. McNally (see June 23, 1972 below) attempted to escape Marion federal prison on May 24, 1978, after Trapnell's girlfriend Barbara Ann Oswald hijacked a helicopter and ordered it to Marion, but that hijacking ended when the pilot grabbed the woman's gun and killed Oswald. On December 21, 1978, Oswald's 17-year-old daughter Robin Oswald hijacked TWA Flight 541 in another attempt to rescue Trapnell. She surrendered after 10 hours of negotiations at the airport in Marion.
- March 8: A Trans World Airlines 707-331 (N761TW) was destroyed by a bomb while parked at Las Vegas, Nevada, United States. Earlier, someone had demanded $2,000,000 in an extortion payment from TWA.
- September 13: TWA Flight 604, a 707-331C (N15712), overran the runway at San Francisco International after the crew rejected take-off when two landing gear tires blew, but no casualties occurred.
- December 5: An EgyptAir 707-366 (SU-AOW) crashed at Beni Sueif, Egypt, probably due to engine separation, while on a training flight, six killed.

1973

- January 2: Pacific Western Airlines Flight 3801, a 707-321 (CF-PWZ), crashed at Telford Lake, Canada; five were killed, and the cause was determined to be pilot error. The crew was inexperienced and fatigued, leading to a controlled flight into terrain accident.
- January 22: A Nigeria Airways 707-3D3C crashed while attempting to land at Kano International Airport in Nigeria; 176 of the 202 passengers and crew on board were killed. The aircraft was operating for Alia Royal Jordanian Airlines.
- June 9: A Varig 707-327C (PP-VLJ) flying from Campinas-Viracopos to Rio de Janeiro-Galeão while making an instrument approach to Rio de Janeiro-Galeão had technical problems with the spoilers, which eventually caused the aircraft to pitch down, descending fast, and strike approach lights and a ditch. Two of the four occupants died.
- July 11: Varig Flight 820, a 707-345C, on scheduled airline service from Galeão Airport, Rio de Janeiro, to Orly Airport, Paris, made an emergency landing in a field in the Orly community due to smoke in the cabin. The fire, smoke, and crash resulted in 123 deaths, with 11 survivors (10 crew, one passenger).
- July 22: Pan Am Flight 816, a 707-321B, crashed shortly after take-off at Papeete, Tahiti, resulting in 78 deaths (only one passenger survived); the cause was unknown, but an instrument failure was suspected.
- August 28: TWA Flight 742, a 707-331 B (N8705T), experienced severe in-flight oscillations over the Pacific Ocean. One critically injured passenger died on August 30.
- November 3: Pan Am Flight 160, a 707-321C (N458PA), crashed on approach to Logan International Airport, Boston. Smoke in the cockpit (believed to be from the cargo) caused the pilots to lose control. All three pilots were killed in the accident.
- December 17: Pan Am Flight 110, a 707-321, was destroyed by fire while parked at Rome after the airport terminal and aircraft were invaded by members of the Palestine Liberation Organization; the terrorists set fire to the aircraft, killing 30.
- December 20: A Lufthansa 707-330B (D-ABOT) undershot the runway at New Delhi, India, with no casualties.

1974

- January 16: TWA Flight 701, a 707-131B, crashed and burned at Los Angeles after the nosegear collapsed on touchdown, with no casualties.
- January 30: Pan Am Flight 806, a 707-321B, crashed at Pago Pago, and 97 were killed in American Samoa's worst air accident.
- April 22: Pan Am Flight 812, a 707-321B, crashed into a mountain while preparing for landing after a 4-hour, 20-minute flight from Hong Kong to Denpasar, Bali, Indonesia. All 107 people on board were killed.
- September 8: TWA Flight 841, a 707-331B, was bombed off Corfu, Greece, with 88 killed.
- September 13: A Conair 720-025 (OY-DSR) was damaged beyond repair at Copenhagen, Denmark, with no casualties; the aircraft was scrapped in 1975.

1975

- June: A former BOAC 707-436, G-APFC, was tested to destruction by Boeing.
- August 3: A chartered Royal Jordanian Airlines 707-321C crashed into a mountain while preparing to land at Agadir-Inezgane Airport. All 188 passengers and crew on board were killed. The Agadir air disaster has the highest death toll of any crash involving a 707.
- December 22: TWA Flight 842, a 707-331 (N18701), crashed on landing at Milan-Malpensa, Italy, with no casualties. The crash occurred after the aircraft executed two instrument approaches to runway 35R, with the first approach abandoned before touchdown due to poor visibility conditions, the second approach continued until landing, which resulted in a runway excursion, loss of control and the crash on the right side of the runway. Ground radar was also malfunctioning, thus making the approaches even more difficult. The pilot was fired after the incident, accused of trying to land where no other airline dared that day, precisely because of the bad weather conditions. The National Transportation Safety Board found inadequacies in the regulations and procedures for flag air carrier operations into foreign airports.

1976

- January 1: Middle East Airlines Flight 438, a 720–047, was bombed and crashed near Al Qaysumah, Saudi Arabia, and 81 were killed.
- April 22: A United States Global of Florida 720-022 (N37777) crashed while on approach to Barranquilla, Colombia; no casualties occurred.
- June 27: A Middle East Airlines 720-047 (OD-AGE) was destroyed by rocket fire and shelling while parked at Beirut, Lebanon; one person was killed.
- August 2: A Korean Air Lines 707-373C (HL7412) crashed near Tehran, Iran, due to crew error, with five killed.
- August 16: An Avianca 720-047 (HK-723) crashed after encountering a rain squall on landing at Mexico City, Mexico; no casualties happened.
- September 7: An Air France 707-328 (F-BHSH) was bombed by seven masked men on the ground while parked at Ajaccio, Corsica.
- October 13: A Lloyd Aero Boliviano 707-121 (N730JP) crashed in Santa Cruz, Bolivia, killing 91 (of whom 88 were killed on the ground when the aircraft crashed into a practice football game).
- December 25: EgyptAir Flight 864, a 707-366, crashed into an industrial complex near Bangkok, Thailand, with 71 killed.

1977

- March 17: A British Airways 707-436 (G-APFK) crashed at Prestwick, Scotland, United Kingdom. It was destroyed by fire following a simulated engine failure on takeoff. All 4 survived.
- May 14: A Dan-Air 707-321C (G-BEBP) crashed on approach to land at Lusaka International Airport, Zambia. The right horizontal stabilizer and elevator separated from the fuselage in flight and the aircraft crashed 3.6 km short of the runway, killing all six occupants.
- August 8: A Pearl Air 707-430 (9Q-CRT) was damaged beyond repair at Sana'a, Yemen Arab Republic.
- November 19: An Ethiopian Airlines 707-360C (ET-ACD) crashed at Rome-Fiumicino, Italy, due to possible crew error, with five killed.

1978

- February 15: A Sabena 707-329 was destroyed by fire at Tenerife, Canary Islands, when the nosewheel collapsed after landing short of the runway, with no casualties.
- April 20: Korean Air Lines Flight 902, a 707-321B, was hit by a missile fired from a Soviet Sukhoi Su-15 interceptor after it had entered Soviet airspace. This caused a rapid decompression of the fuselage, which killed two passengers. The 707 made an emergency landing on a frozen lake near Murmansk, USSR.
- August 3: LAN-Chile 707-351B (CC-CCX) crashed at Buenos-Aires, Argentina, after the crew disregarded procedure, with no casualties.

1979

- January 30: Varig flight 967, operated by 707-323C (PP-VLU), disappeared with six crew on board while operating a cargo service from Tokyo to Rio de Janeiro. The cargo included 53 paintings by Manabu Mabe Worth over $1.24 million. The aircraft, wreckage, crew or paintings were never found and the cause is still undetermined.
- February 19: Quebecair Flight 714, a 707-123B (C-GQBH), slammed onto the runway at St Lucia, Windward Islands, due to windshear, with no casualties; the aircraft was sold to Aviation Sales as N311AS and later scrapped.
- April 1: A Uganda Airlines 707-321C (5X-UAL) was destroyed by Tanzanian forces while parked at Entebbe Airport, Uganda.
- July 23: A Trans Mediterranean Airways 707-327C (OD-AFX) crashed at Beirut while on a training flight, with six killed.
- July 26: Lufthansa Flight 527, a 707-330C (D-ABUY) operating a cargo service from Rio de Janeiro to Frankfurt via Dakar collided with a mountain 5 minutes after take-off from Galeão. The crew of three died.
- August 19: A Cyprus Airways 707-123B (5B-DAM) was damaged beyond repair at Bahrain, with no casualties.
- September 11: A China Airlines 707-324C (B-1834) crashed into the sea off Taipei, Republic of China, while on a training flight, and six were killed.
- November 26: PIA Flight 740, a 707-340C, crashed near Jeddah, Saudi Arabia, after an in-flight fire, and 156 were killed.
- November 30: A Saudi Arabian Airlines 707-373C (HZ-ACE) landed heavily at Jeddah; the aircraft was removed from service and used for spare parts.

== 1980s ==
1980

- January 27: An AVIANCA Boeing 720-059B was damaged beyond repair at Quito, Ecuador.
- February 27: A China Airlines 707-309C operating China Airlines flight 811 (registration B-1826) overshot the runway and crashed while landing at Manila, Philippines, two killed.
- April 4: A Biman Bangladesh 707-373C (registration S2-ABQ, named City of Bayazed Bostami) struck the runway after all four engines lost power just after takeoff from Paya Lebar Airport, Singapore (although pilot error was suspected); there were no casualties, but the aircraft was damaged beyond repair.
- May 11: A Sabena 707-329C (OO-SJH) landed hard at Douala Airport due to windshear, causing gear collapse and wing separation. All three crew survived, but the aircraft was damaged beyond repair.
- November 30: A Trans World Airlines 707-131B (N797TW) landed at San Francisco International Airport with the nosegear retracted; the aircraft was damaged beyond repair.
- December 20: An Aerotal-Colombia 707-321F (HK-2410X) crashed and caught fire at Eldorado Airport after entering rain and fog; all four on board survived.

1981

- January 8: Pakistan International Airlines Flight 320, a 720-047B (AP-AXK) landed nose gear-up at Quetta Airport; the aircraft was damaged beyond repair.
- February 20: Aerolíneas Argentinas Flight 342 nearly hits the transmitting antenna of the North Tower of the World Trade Center in New York during its approach to John F. Kennedy International Airport.
- June 11: A Varig 707-341C (PP-VJT) slid off the runway while landing at Edurado Gomes Airport; all three crew survived, but the aircraft was damaged beyond repair.
- July 5: A Trans Mediterranean Airways 707-324 (OD-AGW) was damaged beyond repair by an explosion at Beirut, Lebanon.
- August 31: A Middle East Airlines 720-023B (OF-AFR) was damaged beyond repair by a bomb at Beirut, Lebanon.
- October 23: A Trans Mediterranean Airways 707-331C (OD-AGT) ran off the runway at Narita Airport while attempting to return to Tokyo due to engine problems; all three on board survived, but the aircraft was damaged beyond repair.
- November 26: A Air India B707-300 (registration VT-DVB) was forced to land at Louis Botha airport Durban, South Africa after being hijacked by mercenaries fleeing an abortive coup in the Seychelles. After freeing the 79 passengers and crew the mercenaries surrendered.
- December 16: A Hispaniola Airways 707-124 (HI-384HA) crashed on landing at Miami International Airport after the right main landing gear collapsed due to fatigue; all five crew survived, but the aircraft was damaged beyond repair.

1982

- January 26: An Alymeda Yemen Airlines 707-348C (7O-ACJ) was damaged beyond repair after it was attacked by an Israeli or Iraqi fighter; the aircraft landed safely at Damascus International Airport.
- June 12: A Middle East Airlines 720-023C (OD-AFP) was destroyed by shelling at Beirut International Airport.
- June 16: Five Middle East Airlines and Trans Mediterranean Airways 707s and 720s (OD-AFU, OD-AFW, OD-AGR, OD-AGN, and OD-AFB) were destroyed by shelling from Israeli forces at Beirut International Airport.
- June 22: Air India Flight 403, a 707-437 (registration VT-DJJ), crashed on landing at Santacruz Airport due to engine power reduction by the pilot, causing the aircraft to undershoot the runway, 17 killed.
- August 1: A Middle East Airlines 720-047B (OD-AGG) was destroyed in a bombing raid by Israeli forces at Beirut International Airport.
- September 10: A Sudan Airways 707-348C (ST-AIM) ditched in the Nile River near Khartoum, Sudan; all 11 on board survived.
- October 17: Egyptair Flight 771, a 707-366C (SU-APE), slid off the runway and crashed at Cointrin Airport; no casualties.
- December 4: A Global International Airways 707-323B (N8434) crashed at Brasilia International Airport while attempting an emergency landing after the left main landing gear broke off; no casualties.

1983

- June 1: A Middle East Airlines 720-023 was damaged beyond repair by shelling at Beirut International Airport.
- September 25: An RN Cargo 707-366 (5N-ARO) was destroyed by fire at Accra, Ghana.
- October 13: A Coastal Airways 707-436 (N4465D) was destroyed by fire on the ground while parked at Perpignan, France.
- December 14: A TAMPA Colombia 707-373C (HK-2401) was being ferried from Medellin, Colombia to Miami, Florida for engine repairs when it crashed on climbout from Enrique Olaya Herrera Airport in Medellin due to engine failure and loss of power, killing all three crew on board and 22 on the ground.

1984

- May 1: Conair Boeing 720-051B, flight OY-452 from Málaga, Spain to Copenhagen, Denmark. Over Biscaya close to Bordeaux, the aircraft experienced a loss in hydraulic pressure with the fuel tanks nearly depleted; the aircraft was nonetheless able to land without further incident.
- July: A Wolf Aviation 707-458 was damaged beyond repair at Isiro, Zaire.
- December 1: A NASA 720-027 (N833NA) was damaged beyond repair at Edwards Air Force Base after being used in a crash test to test fuel fire retardant.

1985

- June 13: A 707-366 (TY-BBR) of the Government of Benin is damaged beyond repair after an aborted takeoff at Sebha, Libya.
- August 21: Two Middle East Airlines 720s (OD-AGQ and OD-AFL) were destroyed by shelling at Beirut International Airport.

1986

- January 27: An Aerolíneas Argentinas 707-387C (LV-JGR) overran the runway while landing at Ministro Pistarini Airport and collided with a hill; all five on board survived, but the aircraft was damaged beyond repair.

1987

- January 3: Varig Flight 797, a 707-379C, crashed when making a return to Abidjan, Côte d'Ivoire after one of its engines failed. One person survived out of the 51 people on board.
- January 8: A Middle East Airlines 707-323C (OD-AHB) was destroyed by shelling shortly after landing at Beirut, Lebanon; no casualties.
- February 12: Conair Boeing 720-051B (OY-APU) nose wheel collapses during a standard landing in Salzburg, Austria. Two people needed shock treatment afterwards.
- April 6: Conair Boeing 720-051B (OY-APY) nose wheel collapses at Rome-Ciampino. Belly landing causes fire. No persons injured. Very similar to the accident in Salzburg less than two months earlier.
- April 11: A Transbrasil 707-330C was damaged beyond repair at Manaus, Brazil.
- April 13: Burlington Air Express Flight 721, a 707-351C, crashed near Kansas City International Airport, Missouri due to an intentional descent by the pilot and poor CRM, killing all four on board.
- November 29: Korean Air Flight 858, a 707-3B5C, exploded over the Andaman Sea, in the Indian Ocean in a terrorist attack with a bomb placed by North Korean agents. All 115 people on board died.

1988

- February 8: A TAAG Angola Airlines 707-349C (D2-TOI) struck a radio tower on top of a building while on approach to Luanda-4 de Fevereiro Airport and overran the runway on landing and collapsing the nosegear; all nine on board survived, but the aircraft was damaged beyond repair.
- July 21: An Angola Air Charter 707-328C crashed near Lagos, Nigeria.
- October 10: A TAAG Angola Airlines 707-347C (D2-TOM) was destroyed by an electrical fire while parked at Luanda, Angola.
- October 17: Uganda Airlines Flight 775 crashed while attempting to land at Roma-Fiumicino Airport. Thirty-three of the 52 passengers and crew on board were killed.
- November 19: An Air Zimbabwe 707-330B was damaged beyond repair at Harare, Zimbabwe.
- December 13: A GAS Air Nigeria 707-351C (5N-AYJ) crashed at Kom Omran, Egypt due to possible fuel exhaustion, killing all eight on board and one on the ground.

1989

- February 8: Independent Air Flight 1851, a Boeing 707, crashed into a hill on approach to Santa Maria, Azores. All 144 people on board were killed. Wreckage remains at the site to this day.
- March 21: Transbrasil Flight 801, a cargo 707-349C registration PT-TCS, flying from Manaus to São Paulo-Guarulhos crashed at the district of Vila Barros in Guarulhos, shortly before touch-down at runway 09R. That day, at 12:00 the runway was going to be closed for maintenance and the crew decided to speed up procedures to touch-down before closure (it was already 11:54). In a hurry, one of the crew members, by mistake, activated the air-dynamic brakes and the aircraft lost too much speed to have enough aerodynamic support (Stall). As a consequence the aircraft crashed at approximately 2 km from the airport. There were 25 fatalities which of these three were crew members and 22 were civilians on the accident site. As well as the 22 fatalities, there were also over 200 injured on the ground. The very same aircraft had been starring in the 1970 movie Airport.
- May 17: A Somali Airlines 707-330B (6O-SBT) overran the runway at Jomo Kenyatta International Airport following an aborted takeoff; all 70 on board survived, but the aircraft was damaged beyond repair.
- July 11: A Kenya Airways 707-351B (5Y-BBK) overran the runway at Bole Airport due to brake failure following an emergency landing, all 76 on board survived, but the aircraft was damaged beyond repair.

== 1990s ==
1990

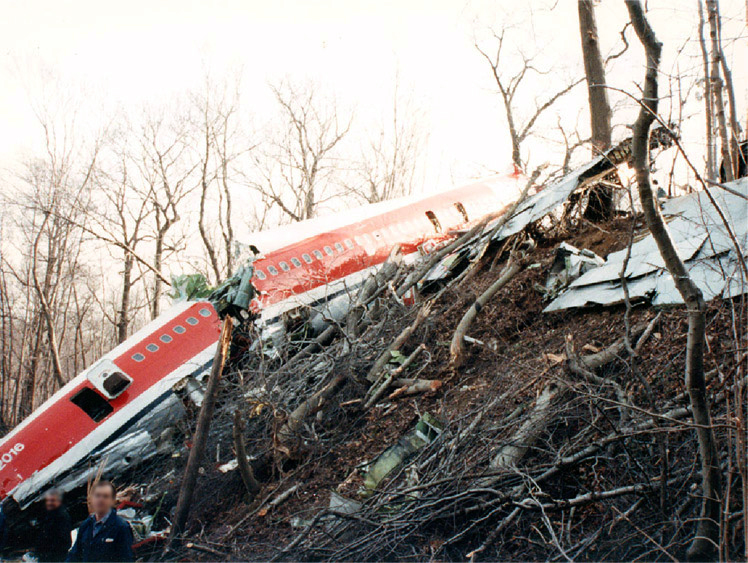
Avianca Flight 52

- January 25: Avianca Flight 52, a 707-321B, crashed after running out of fuel in Long Island, New York. The 707 was delayed numerous times because of air traffic control tower shift changes while in the mist of heavy fog in New York. A total of 73 people died. The FAA issued new regulations requiring each plane to stay assigned to only one traffic controller from approach to landing.
- March 1: A Katale Aero Transport 707-329C was damaged beyond repair at Goma, Zaire.
- June 23: A LAN-Chile 707-312B was damaged beyond repair at Santiago, Chile.
- July 14: A Trans Arabian Air Transport 707-349 was damaged beyond repair at Khartoum, Sudan.
- July 25: An Ethiopian Airlines 707-379 was damaged beyond repair at Addis Ababa, Ethiopia.
- October 2: A China Southwest Airlines 707-3J6B was struck by a Boeing 737-200 whilst parked in Guangzhou, China. There were no deaths aboard the 707 but others perished in the other two planes.
- December 3: A Sudan Air Cargo 707-321C crashed near Nairobi, Kenya.

1991

- January 10: A TAROM 707-3K1C was damaged beyond repair at Bucharest, Romania.
- March 25: An Ethiopian Airlines 707-385C was damaged beyond repair by shelling at Asmara, Ethiopia.
- August 31: A Lloyd Aero Boliviano 707-323C was destroyed by fire at Dothan, Alabama, United States.
- August 31: A Uganda Airlines 707-328C chartered by Croatian-Canadian businessman Anton Kikaš to smuggle arms was seized by Yugoslav authorities at Zagreb airport. The aircraft was subsequently used by Yugoslav authorities for military purposes and refugee evacuation.
- October 29: A 707-368C of the Royal Australian Air Force stalled and crashed into the sea off East Sale, Victoria. All five crew on board died.
- December 7: A Libyan Arab Airlines 707-351C was destroyed by fire at Tripoli, Libya.

1992

- February 20: A TAAG-Angola Airlines 707-349C was damaged beyond repair at Luanda, Angola.
- March 23: A Golden Star Air Cargo 707-321C crashed at Mount Hymittus, Greece.
- March 31: Trans-Air Service Flight 671, a 707-321C was damaged beyond repair at Istres, France, when the number-three engine separated in flight, taking with it the number-four engine. An emergency landing was made, but the aircraft was damaged beyond repair by fire. This accident was featured on Season 22, Episode 2 of Mayday.
- April 25: A TAMPA-Colombia 707-324C was damaged in Miami, USA, when the number-three engine separated in flight, taking with it the number-four engine. An emergency landing was made. The aircraft returned to service shortly after the accident. This is a similar incident to Trans-Air Service Flight 671 which happened 1 month earlier. This accident was mentioned on Season 22, Episode 2 of Mayday.
- April 29: An EAS Cargo 707-351C was damaged beyond repair at Ilorin, Nigeria.
- November 25: A DAS Air Cargo 707-321C damaged beyond repair at Kano, Nigeria.
- November 26: An AeroBrasil 707-365C crashed at Abidjan-Port Bouet, Côte d'Ivoire.

1993

- January 31: A LADE 707-387B was damaged beyond repair at Recife, Brazil.
- July 26: A Trans Mediterranean Airways 707-327C was damaged beyond repair at Amsterdam-Schiphol, Netherlands.

1994

- October 9: A TAMPA-Colombia 707-324C was damaged beyond repair at São Paulo, Colombia.
- December 19: Nigeria Airways Flight 9805, a 707-3F9C, crashed.

1995

- August 17: A TAROM 707-321C was damaged at N'djamena, Chad.
- September 19: A Kish Air Boeing 707 is hijacked by a flight attendant.
- November 30: An Azerbaijan Airlines 707-323C crashed near Baku, Azerbaijan.

1996

- June 30: A DAS Air Cargo 707-369C was damaged beyond repair at Bamako, Mali, when the wingtip hit the ground on landing due to windshear.
- August 21: An Egypt Air 707-366 was damaged beyond repair at Istanbul, Turkey.
- October 22: Millon Air Flight 406 a 707-323C with four people aboard crashed on take-off from Manta, Ecuador killing the 4 people aboard the plane and 30 people on the ground and seriously injuring 50 others.
- October 23: A 707 belonging to the Argentine Air Force crashed on take-off roll after failing to achieve required take-off speed (V_{2}) at Buenos Aires International Airport.
- October 23: A Congo Airlines 707 was damaged beyond repair at Kinshasa, Congo.

1997

- January 16: A First International Airways plane was destroyed by fire at Kinshasa, Zaire.

1998

- March 10: An Air Memphis 707-366C crashed at Mombasa, Kenya. All six occupants were killed.
- November 14: An IAT plane took off from Oostende Airport but crashed into the ground within a few minutes. It was a cargo flight and there were no deaths.

== 2000s ==
2000

- September 21: The 707 belonging to the government of Togo coming from Valencia Airport, Spain, en route to Lomé-Tokoin Airport, Togo, experienced a cockpit fire about 200 km/125 miles from Niamey, Niger, and crash landed at Hamani Diori Airport, Niger. None of the 10 people aboard were killed, but the aircraft was destroyed by subsequent fire.

2002

- July 4: A 707-123B on a Gomair flight from N'Djamena Airport, Chad, to Brazzaville-Maya Maya Airport, Republic of the Congo carrying a mixed load of cargo and passengers crashed. The aircraft experienced technical problems and diverted to Bangui, Central African Republic. Whilst on approach, the aircraft descended too quickly and made ground contact in a suburb. It subsequently bounced and broke up. Of the 30 people on board, 28 died in the accident.

2004

- October 23: A BETA Cargo 707 on a cargo flight from Manaus-Eduardo Gomes International Airport, Brazil to São Paulo–Guarulhos International Airport, Brazil, aborted take-off from Manaus due to a "loud noise". The aircraft afterwards started tilting to the right. The landing gear apparently ruptured the right wing. The 37-year-old aircraft (registration PP-BSE) was written off.

2005

- March 19: A Cargo Plus Aviation-owned 707-300 freighter on a wet-lease to Ethiopian Airlines crashed into Lake Victoria on approach to Runway 35 at Entebbe, Uganda, on the lake's northern shore. The 31-year-old 707 freighter was on approach to Runway 35 during its second attempt to land. Its right wing clipped an outcrop on approach and it began to break up. The accident happened in heavy rain. The aircraft broke up, but the crew of five survived.
- April 20: Saha Airlines Flight 171, a 707-3J9C (EP-SHE) flying from Kish Island, crashed on landing at Mehrabad Airport, Tehran, following an unstabilized approach with a higher than recommended airspeed. Gear and/or a tyre failed after touchdown and the flight overran the far end of the runway. Of the 12 crew and 157 passengers, three passengers were killed, reportedly falling into the river after evacuation.
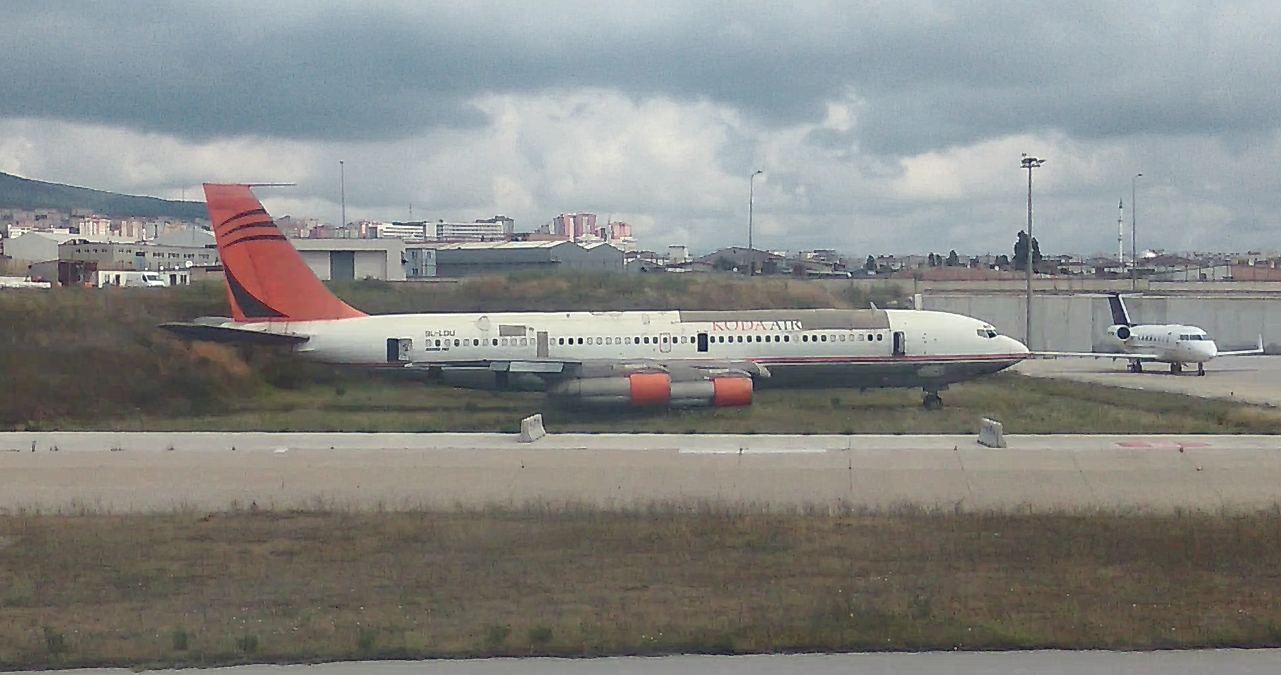
  The wreckage of Koda Air Boeing 707-300 (9L-LDU) at Sabiha Gökçen airport in Istanbul.
- December 23 : A Koda Air-owned 707-300 cargo caught fire while parked on the apron of Sabiha Gökçen Airport in Istanbul, Turkey. No one was injured, but the aircraft (9L-LDU), built in 1966, was written off. The wreckage is lying at the end of the taxiway of the airport.

2009

- August 3: Saha Airlines Flight 124, a 707-3J9C (EP-SHK), made an emergency landing at Ahwaz Airport after reporting an uncontained engine failure; all 174 on board survived, and the aircraft was subsequently repaired.
- October 21: Azza Transport Flight 2241, a 707-330C, crashed shortly after takeoff from Sharjah International Airport, United Arab Emirates. The flight was carrying cargo only and all six crew members were killed.

== 2010s ==
2011

- May 18: Omega Aerial Refueling Services Flight 70 (the former Pan Am 707 involved in a 1969 bird strike accident) crashed on take-off from Naval Air Station Point Mugu, California, United States, due to the separation of the number-two engine from the port wing on take-off. The number-one engine was also damaged in the process. The aircraft was destroyed in the postcrash fire. All three crew survived.

2019

- January 14: a Boeing 707 freighter operated by Saha Airlines crashed near Karaj, Iran, killing 15 of the 16 people on board. The aircraft was transporting meat. It departed Manas International Airport at an unknown time, for its destination, Payam International Airport. Unbeknownst to the crew, they had mistaken Fath Air Base's Runway 31L for their assigned Runway 30 at Payam. Similarities between the two airfields, such as their proximity to one another, both runway thresholds being almost identical and adverse weather conditions led to the confusion and subsequent accident. Fath Air Base is a military field housing a helicopter squadron, with a 1,369 meter-long runway, too short for the Boeing to come to a complete stop. Again, low visibility prevented the pilot from seeing the short length of the runway, leading him to think the runway was long enough to land. After landing, the Boeing 707 overran the runway, crashing through a perimeter wall into a residential area at the end of the runway. A fire then broke out. The only known survivor, the flight engineer, was rushed to hospital to be treated for various injuries. The aircraft, registered EP-CPP, was 42 years old at the time of the accident and the last surviving 707 in operation. The aircraft was written off.

== 2020s ==
2025

- June 15: An Iranian Air Force (IRIAF) Boeing 707 tanker aircraft was destroyed on the ground at Mashhad Airport in northeast Iran.
