= List of fatal accidents involving commercial cargo aircraft =

This article is a list of fatal accidents involving commercial cargo aircraft and is grouped by the years in which the accidents and incidents occurred.

== 1947 ==
16 June
An Aeroflot Lisunov Li-2 (CCCP-L4088) crashes on takeoff from Leninabad Airport after failing to gain altitude due to overloading, killing three of seven on board.

== 1949 ==
29 January
An Aeroflot Lisunov Li-2 (CCCP-L4491) stalls and crashes on takeoff from Nizhnaya Pesha Airport, Russia due to load shifting, killing three of four on board.

== 1951 ==
27 March
An Air Transport Charter Douglas Dakota 3 crashes shortly after takeoff from Ringway Airport en route to Nutts Corner Airport, killing two of the three on board.

== 1955 ==
24 September
Flying Tiger Line Flight 7413–23, a Douglas C-54A (N90433), ditched 1000 mi off Honolulu, Hawaii due to triple engine failure and crew error, killing three of five crew.

== 1956 ==
13 February: A Maritime Central Airways Bristol Freighter 31 (CF-FZU) crashes on climbout from Frobisher Bay Airport, Canada due to load shifting, killing all three crew.

== 1958 ==
25 May
A Dan-Air Avro 685 York C.1 crashed at Gurgaon, India due to an in-flight fire caused by engine failure, killing four of five on board.
2 September
An Independent Air Travel Vickers VC.1 Viking crashed near Southall, Middlesex due to pilot error following engine failure, killing all three crew on board and four people on the ground.
9 September
A Flying Tiger Line Lockheed L-1049H Super Constellation (N6920C), struck Mount Ōyama near Tokyo, Japan, killing all eight on board.

== 1959 ==
23 April
An Air Charter Avro Super Trader IV crashed on Mount Süphan, Turkey, killing all 12 crew on board.
24 November
TWA Flight 595 a Lockheed L-1049 Super Constellation crashed while landing at Midway International Airport due to pilot error, all 3 crew members and 8 people on the ground were killed.

== 1961 ==
21 July
Alaska Airlines Flight 779 crashes on approach to Sheyma Airport, killing all six crew members on board.

== 1962 ==
15 March
Flying Tiger Line Flight 7816, a Lockheed L-1049H Super Constellation, crashed at Adak Island Naval Air Station, Alaska due to pilot error, killing one of seven crew.
14 December
Flying Tiger Line Flight 183, a Lockheed L-1049H Super Constellation, crashed near Lockheed Air Terminal due to pilot incapacitation, killing all five crew on board and three on the ground.

== 1964 ==
24 December
Flying Tiger Line Flight 282, a Lockheed L-1049H Super Constellation, struck the top of Sweeney Ridge in San Bruno, California after an unexplained course change, killing the three crew.

== 1965 ==
15 December
Flying Tiger Line Flight 914, a Lockheed L-1049H Super Constellation, struck California Peak due to spatial disorientation, killing the three crew.

== 1966 ==
15 November
Pan Am Flight 708, A Boeing 727 crashed on approach the Frankfurt Airport, killing all three crew members.
24 December
A Flying Tiger Line Canadair CL-44D4-1 (N228SW) crashed short of the runway at Da Nang Airport, killing all four crew on board and 107 on the ground.

== 1967 ==
6 January
A Channel Air Lift Curtiss C-46F (N30046) stalls and crashes at Hilo International Airport, Hawaii while attempting an emergency landing after the load shifted to the rear, killing the three crew.

== 1968 ==
3 July
BKS Air Transport Flight C.6845, an Airspeed Ambassador crashed and while landing at Heathrow Airport, killing all three crew members and three of the five passengers.

26 December
Pan Am Flight 799, a Boeing 707-321C crashed shortly after takeoff due to improper flap configuration, killing all three crew.

== 1970 ==
27 July
Flying Tiger Line Flight 45, a Douglas DC-8-63AF (N785FT), crashes off of Naha Air Force Base due to excessive descent, killing the four crew.

== 1976 ==
4 February
A Líneas Aéreas del Caribe Douglas DC-6 (HK-1389) crashed into the sea at Santa Marta, Colombia on a flight to Curaçao, three killed.

27 August
An Aeronaves del Perú Canadair CL-44 (OB-R-1104) went missing on a flight between from Lima, Peru to Maiquetía, Venezuela, six crew presumed killed.

16 September
An Aerosucre Colombia Curtiss C-46 (HK-1282) went missing over the Caribbean on a flight to Aruba, two crew presumed killed.

13 October
1976 Lloyd Aereo Boliviano Boeing 707 crash, the aircraft crashed shortly after takeoff from El Trompillo Airport, killing all 3 crew members and 88 people on the ground.

27 December
A Transportes Aereos Itinez Fairchild Packet (CP-983) destroyed on take-off at San Ramón, Bolivia, two crew and two passengers killed.

== 1977 ==
13 January
JAL Cargo Flight 8054, a Japan Air Lines Douglas DC-8 (JA8054) destroyed shortly after take-off at Anchorage, Alaska, United States, three crew and two cargo handlers killed.

31 January
A TransNorthern Aviation Chase C-122 (N5904V) was destroyed on take-off from Anchorage, Alaska, one crew killed and two others seriously injured.

11 February
A CSA Ilyushin Il-14 (OK-OCA) was destroyed on approach near Bratislava, Czechoslovakia when it hit trees 1,800 m (1.12 mi) short of the runway, two crew and two passengers killed, one crew seriously injured.

4 March
An Overseas National Airways Douglas DC-8 (N8635) was destroyed on landing at Niamey, Niger, two killed and two seriously injured.

2 April
An Aviogenex Tupolev Tu-134A (YU-AJS) crashed on landing at Libreville, Gabon, six crew and two passengers killed.

13 May
A LOT Antonov An-12 (SP-LZA) crashed near Aramoun, Lebanon on approach to Beirut International Airport; the crew of nine were killed.

14 May
A Dan Air Boeing 707 (G-BEBP) crashed near Lusaka, Zambia, on approach after the horizontal stabiliser and elevator failed, five crew and one passenger killed.

30 June
A Cooperativa de Montecillos Lockheed L-188 Electra (N126US) went missing on a flight between San José, Costa Rica and Maiquetía, Venezuela, three crew and one passenger presumed killed.

6 July
A Fleming International Airways Lockheed L-188 Electra (N280F) crashed on take-off at St. Louis, Missouri, United States, three crew killed.

20 July
An Ethiopian Airlines Douglas DC-3 (ET-ABF) flying from Tippi Airport, (TIE/HATP), to Jimma Airport, (JIM/HAJM), crashed into a mountain in bad weather at Tubo Milkie, Ethiopia, three crew and two passengers killed.

20 August
A Monarch Aviation Convair CV-880-22-2 (N8817E) crashed on departure from Juan Santamaría International Airport, San José, Costa Rica (SJO/MROC). The three crew were killed when the aircraft struck trees 2 minutes and 20 seconds after take-of, due to being overloaded.

25 August
An Island Airways Short Skyvan (N4917) crashed and burned 1,100 m (3,500 ft) from the runway at Kona International Airport, Hawaii, two crew killed.

2 September
A Transmeridian Air Cargo Canadair CL-44 (G-ATZH) crashed near Waglan Island, Hong Kong following engine failure on take-off, four crew killed.

12 September
A Safe Air Cargo Douglas DC-7BF (N6314J) crashed on take-off at Yakutat, Alaska, United States, four crew killed.

30 September
An Aviateca Douglas DC-3 (TG-AKA) crashed on landing at Mundo Maya International Airport, Flores, El Petén, Guatemala, of the three crew on board one was killed and one seriously injured.

19 November
An Ethiopian Airlines Boeing 707 (ET-ACD) was destroyed when it hit trees on departure from Rome, Italy, three crew and two passengers killed.

20 November
A Norcanair Bristol 170 (C-FWAD) stalled on take-off at Hay River, Northwest Territories after the load shifted, one killed and one seriously injured.

18 December
United Airlines Flight 2860, a Douglas DC-8-54AF crashed into the mountains near Kaysville, Utah, United States, three crew killed.

== 1978 ==
28 February
A Talair DHC-6 Twin Otter (P2-TGT) crashed on approach to Garaina Airport, Garaina, Papua New Guinea, one killed.

14 August
An Aeropesca Colombia Curtiss C-46 Commando (HK-1350C) crashed in bad weather, with no navigation equipment, near Tota, Boyacá, Colombia.

27 August
After take-off from Muscat International Airport, A'Seeb, (MCT/OOMS), a New World Air Charters Douglas DC-6 (N122A) crashed into Jabel Hameem near Muscat, Oman, four crew killed.

== 1979 ==
30 January
A Varig Boeing 707-320C disappeared on a flight from Tokyo, Japan to Rio de Janeiro, Brazil, five crew missing presumed killed.

26 March
An Interflug Ilyushin Il-18D (DM-STL) destroyed by fire following engine failure on take-off from Luanda-4 de Fevereiro Airport, Luanda, Angola, four crew and six passengers killed.

25 May
A Sea Airmotive de Havilland Canada DHC-4A Caribou (N581PA) stalled during a crosswind turn and destroyed at Bullen Point, Alaska, United States; the three crew were killed.

26 July
Lufthansa Cargo Flight 527, a Boeing 707-330C (D-ABUY), operating a cargo service from Rio de Janeiro to Frankfurt via Dakar, collided with a mountain 5 minutes after take-off from Galeão. The crew of 3 died.

28 September
A Transportes Aéreos Bolivianos Lockheed Hercules (CP-1375) crashed on take-off at Tocumen International Airport, Panama, four crew killed.

18 November
Transamerica Airlines Flight 18, a Lockheed L-188CF Electra (N859U), departed Hill AFB for an IFR cargo flight to Nellis AFB, disintegrated in flight near Salt Lake City, Utah, United States following electrical failure, three crew killed.

== 1980 ==
16 February
A Redcoat Air Cargo Bristol 175 Britannia 253 (G-BRAC), en route from Belize International Airport to RAF Brize Norton crashed after take-off at Billerica, Massachusetts, United States, due to intake icing; four crew and three passengers killed and one crew member seriously injured.

1 August
An Aeronaves del Perú Douglas DC-8 (OB-R-1143) crashed into a mountain on approach to Mexico City, Mexico in fog, three of the seven crew killed.

23 August
A Transamerica Airlines Lockheed L-100-30 Hercules (N18ST), en route from Panama City–Bay County International Airport, FL (PFN/KPFN) to San Diego, collided with and killed a parachutist near Otay, California, United States. All five people involved were killed.

10 September
An Aerovias del Norte Llota Douglas DC-3 (HK-329) went missing in bad weather, wreckage later found at Puerto Olaya, Colombia, three crew killed.

== 1982 ==
18 September
Aeroservicios Ecuatorianos Flight 767-103, a Douglas DC-8-55F, failed to take off at Quito Airport, Ecuador, killing four crew and 49 on the ground.

== 1983 ==
11 January
United Airlines Flight 2885, a Douglas DC-8-54F, crashed shortly after takeoff from Detroit Metropolitan Wayne County Airport due to pilot error and aircraft upset, killing the three crew.

== 1987 ==
13 April
Buffalo Airways Flight 721, a cargo Boeing 707 flying from Oklahoma City to Fort Wayne, crashed on approach to its stopover in Kansas City. All four people on board were killed.
30 July
A Belize Air International Boeing C-97 Stratofreighter crashes on Mexican Federal Highway 15 shortly after takeoff from Mexico City, killing five of 12 on board and 44 on the ground. The aircraft was transporting 18 horses to Florida; the horses panicked and ran around in the cargo compartment, causing the center of gravity to shift too far to the rear.

== 1989 ==
19 February
Flying Tiger Line Flight 066, a Boeing 747-200F, crashed near Subang International Airport due to ATC and crew errors, killing the four crew.

18 March
Evergreen International Airlines Flight 17, a McDonnell Douglas DC-9 crashed shortly after takeoff from Kelly Field after one of its cargo doors opened in-flight, killing both pilots.

21 March
Transbrasil Flight 801, a Boeing 707, stalled after a crew member mistakenly applied the brakes and crashed into a slum in São Paulo, killing all three crew members on board, and 22 others on the ground.

27 November
A Tepper Aviation (but flying on behalf of the CIA) Lockheed L-100 Hercules crashes on approach to Jamba, Angola for reasons unknown, killing all five on board.

== 1991 ==
29 December
China Airlines Flight 358, a Boeing 747-200F, struck a hill near Wanli, Taiwan after both right side engines separated, killing the five crew.

== 1992 ==
15 February
Air Transport International Flight 805, a Douglas DC-8, crashed after aborting a landing at Toledo Express Airport, killing all four crew members.

4 October
El Al Flight 1862, a Boeing 747-200F, crashed into an apartment complex in Amsterdam after both right side engines separated, killing all 4 people on board the plane as well as 39 people on the ground.

== 1994 ==
24 February
Pulkovo Aviation Enterprise Flight 9045, an Antonov An-12, crashed on approach to Nalchik while carrying 12,515 kg of coins from the Saint Petersburg Mint.

21 December
Air Algerie Flight 702P, a Boeing 737 crashed while landing at Coventry Airport, killing all three crew members and both passengers.

== 1995 ==
16 February
Air Transport International Flight 782, a McDonnell Douglas DC-8, crashed while attempting to take off from Kansas City International Airport, killing all three crew members.

== 1996 ==
8 January
1996 Air Africa Antonov An-32 crash, the aircraft crashed during takeoff due to being overloaded killing 2 of the 6 crew members on board and an estimated 225 to 348 people on the ground, the official death toll is 239.

4 February
LAC Colombia Flight 028, a Douglas DC-8 crashed shortly after takeoff from Silvio Pettirossi International Airport after the Captain and Flight engineer purposely shut off two of the planes engines in an effort to prank the first officer, all 4 crew members and 18 people on the ground were killed.

19 August
Spair Airlines Flight 3601, an Ilyushin Il-76T, crashed while attempting to land at Belgrade Nikola Tesla Airport after an electrical failure, killing the 11 crew.

22 October
Millon Air Flight 406, a Boeing 707 crashed shortly after takeoff from Eloy Alfaro International Airport due to engine failure, killing all four crew members and 30 people on the ground.

9 December
An Emery Worldwide, a Douglas C-47A, N75142, crashed on approach to Boise Airport killing both crew. The aircraft was on a cargo flight to Salt Lake City International Airport when the starboard engine caught fire shortly after take-off and the decision was made to return to Boise.

22 December
Airborne Express Flight 827, a Douglas DC-8, crashed into a mountain during a test flight killing all three crew members and three passengers on board.

== 1997 ==
7 August
Fine Air Flight 101, a DC-8-61F registration N27UA, crashed on departure from Miami International Airport onto NW 72nd Avenue less than a mile (1.6 km) from the airport. The freight pallets were improperly secured and shifted during takeoff, causing the aircraft to stall.

== 1999 ==
15 April
Korean Air Cargo Flight 6316, a McDonnell Douglas MD-11F, crashed shortly after takeoff from Shanghai Hongqiao International Airport due to pilot error, killing the three crew and 5 people on the ground.

7 July
Hinduja Cargo Services Flight 8533, a Boeing 727 crashed into hills shortly after takeoff from Tribhuvan International Airport, killing all 5 crew members.

22 December
Korean Air Cargo Flight 8509, a Boeing 747-200F, crashed shortly after takeoff from London Stansted Airport due to instrument malfunction and pilot error, killing the four crew.

== 2000 ==
16 February
Emery Worldwide Flight 17, a McDonnell Douglas DC-8-71F crashes into an automobile salvage yard shortly after taking off from Sacramento Mather Airport on a flight to Dayton, Ohio, killing all 3 crew members on board. The cause of the crash was a disconnection of the right elevator control tab.

== 2001 ==
27 February
Loganair Flight 670A, a Short 360, crashes while on route to Belfast International Airport, killing both crew members.

== 2002 ==
1 July
DHL Flight 611, a Boeing 757-200F, collided in mid-air with a Bashkirian Airlines Tupolev Tu-154 over Überlingen, Germany, killing the two pilots in the DHL plane and all 69 people in the Bashkirian Airlines plane.

== 2004 ==
13 August
Air Tahoma Flight 185, a Convair CV-580 crashed while landing at Cincinnati/Northern Kentucky International Airport due to pilot error, The first officer was killed and the captain the only other occupant on board survived.
14 October
MK Airlines Flight 1602, a Boeing 747-200F, crashed on takeoff from Halifax Stanfield International Airport due to pilot error, killing the seven crew.

== 2009 ==
23 March
FedEx Express Flight 80, a McDonnell Douglas MD-11F, crashed on landing at Narita International Airport due to pilot error, killing the two pilots.

21 October
Azza Transport Flight 2241, a Boeing 707-330C, crashed on takeoff from Sharjah International Airport due to loss of control caused by crew errors, killing the six crew.

28 November
Avient Aviation Flight 324, a McDonnell Douglas MD-11F, crashed on takeoff from Shanghai Pudong International Airport, killing three of the seven crew.

== 2010 ==
13 April
AeroUnion Flight 302, an Airbus A300B4-200F, crashed in Monterrey while attempting to land in poor weather, killing the five crew members and one person on the ground.
3 September
UPS Airlines Flight 6, a Boeing 747-400F, crashed near Dubai while attempting to land after the crew reported a cargo fire, killing the two pilots.
12 October
Transafrik International Flight 662, a Lockheed L-100 Hercules crashed into a mountain on approach to Kabul International Airport killing all 8 crew members on board.
28 November
Sun Way Flight 4412, an Ilyushin Il-76TD, crashed at Karachi, Pakistan while attempting an emergency landing after an engine caught fire, killing the eight crew on board and four on the ground.

== 2011 ==
6 July
Silk Way Airlines Flight 995 an Ilyushin Il-76 crashed near Bagram Air Base, killing the nine crew; although the Taliban claimed responsibility for shooting down the aircraft, analysis of the flight recorder suggested controlled flight into terrain.
28 July
Asiana Airlines Flight 991, a Boeing 747-400F, crashed off Jeju Island, South Korea after the crew reported a fire in the cargo compartment, killing the two pilots.
9 August
An Avis Amur Antonov An-12 crashed at Omsukchan, Russia due to loss of control following an engine fire, killing all 11 passengers and crew on board.

== 2013 ==
8 March
Alaska Central Express Flight 51, a Beechcraft 1900 crashed on approach to Dillingham Airport due to pilot error, killing both pilots.
29 April
National Airlines Flight 102, a Boeing 747-400BCF, stalled and crashed just after takeoff from Bagram Airfield after its cargo broke loose, killing all seven crew members.
14 August
UPS Airlines Flight 1354, an Airbus A300F4-600R, crashed short of the runway at Birmingham–Shuttlesworth International Airport, killing the two pilots.
26 December
2013 Irkut-Avia An-12 crash, The aircraft crashed while landing at Irkutsk Northwest Airport due to pilot error, all 6 crew members and 3 passengers on board were killed.

== 2014 ==
29 October
Skyway Enterprises Flight 7101, a Short 360, crashes shortly after takeoff from Princess Juliana International Airport, killing both crew members.

== 2019 ==
14 January
2019 Saha Airlines Boeing 707 crash, The pilots of the aircraft mistakenly landed at Fath Air Base which has a shorter runway than the intended destination of Payam International Airport, the aircraft subsequently overran the runway killing 15 out of the 16 crew members on board.

23 February
Atlas Air Flight 3591, a Boeing 767-300BCF, entered a nosedive and crashed in Trinity Bay near Anahuac, Texas en route to Houston from Miami due to loss of control following crew errors; all 3 crew were killed. The aircraft was operating for Atlas Air on behalf of Amazon Prime Air.

4 October
Ukraine Air Alliance Flight 4050, an Antonov An-12, crashes short of the runway at Lviv due to fuel exhaustion, killing five of eight on board.

== 2020 ==
22 August
An Antonov An-26 operating as a cargo charter flight for South West Aviation crashed shortly after takeoff for undetermined reasons, killing 8 of the 9 people on board.

== 2021 ==
3 November
Grodno Aviakompania Flight 1252, an Antonov An-12BK, crashed during an attempted go-around at International Airport Irkutsk, killing all 9 people on board.

== 2024 ==
23 April
2024 Alaska Air Fuel Douglas C-54 crash, The aircraft crashed shortly after takeoff from Fairbanks International Airport following a catastrophic engine failure. Both pilots were killed
25 November
Swiftair Flight 5960, a Boeing 737-400SF, crashed on final approach to Vilnius Airport due to disabled hydraulic systems, killing the captain and wounding the other 3 crew members.

== 2025 ==
3 May
2025 IBM Airlines Boeing 737 incident, The aircraft was destroyed by the Sudanese Armed Forces killing all 20 occupants on board. It is suspected the aircraft was used to transport weapons for the Rapid Support Forces.
20 October
Emirates SkyCargo Flight 9788, a Boeing 747-400, suffered a runway excursion at Hong Kong International Airport leading to a collision with a ground vehicle. All 4 crew members survived, however, the 2 airport staff inside the ground vehicle were killed.
4 November
UPS Airlines Flight 2976, a McDonnell Douglas MD-11F, crashed during the takeoff roll at Louisville Muhammad Ali International Airport, killing all 3 crew members as well as 12 people on the ground.

== 2026 ==
7 July
K2 Airways Flight 1732, a Boeing 737-400BDSF registered AP-BOI, crashed near the coast of Ormara after it took off from Sharjah International Airport, United Arab Emirates heading to Karachi-Jinnah International Airport, Pakistan. There were reportedly at least 5 people on board. Searches for the crew have been ongoing.

== Bibliography ==
- "Transnorthern Aviation:Flying alaska on demand".
- "20 AUG 1977 Convair CV-880-22-2". aviation-safety.net.
- "Accident description D-ABUY". Aviation Safety Network.
- "Aircraft Accident Report- Transamerica Airlines, Inc., -Lockheed L-188, N859U, August 26, 1980 Salt Lake City, Utah, November 18, 1979" (PDF). NTSB.
