= Ashena Courier Co =

ACC Ashena Courier Co
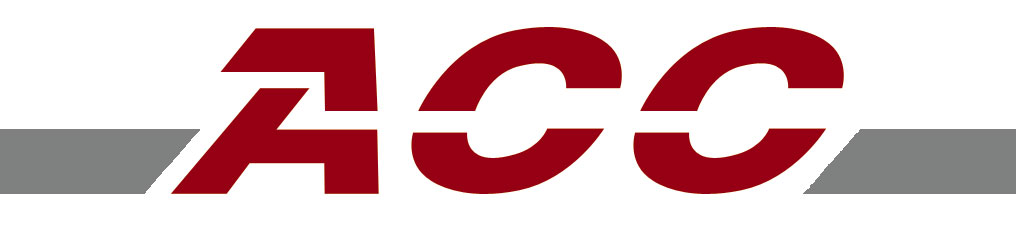
- Company type: Privately held company
- Industry: Express Logistics
- Founded: 2007
- Headquarters: Payam Airport, Karaj Iran
- Key people: Vali Farnam (CEO, Chairman)
- Products: ACC Express; ACC Post; ACC Cargo Services
- Website: www.acc-ir.com

Ashena Courier Co (ACC) (Persian name: پیک آشنا ) was the first private postal service in Iran. ACC was established in early 2008 in Tehran as a local courier company with the objective of becoming the first private Iranian postal and international logistics service provider. That year, ACC secured contracts with various governmental and non-governmental organizations to handle the transfer of documents and parcels between those organizations. ACC received its license as a Special Courier Co. from I.R.I Post Company in mid-2008. Later, ACC was approved by the Ministry of Communications and Information Technology (MICT) and the Communications Regulatory Authority (CRA). ACC Express provides courier services across Iran. ACC provides warehousing and cargo services at Payam Airport.

== ACC Cargo Services ==
ACC is an official agent for Payam Aviation Services Co. The company provides warehousing and cargo services at Payam Airport. ACC cargo services also provides consulting services that include:

- Import/export management
- Customs clearance
- Freight forwarding
- Rate negotiation
- Distribution network planning
- Fleet management
- Site selection for facility location
- Freight consolidation and logistics audit.

== See also ==
- Courier
- Freight company
- Express mail
- Mail
- Cargo
