= American Airlines Flight 514 =

1959 aviation accident on Long Island, New York

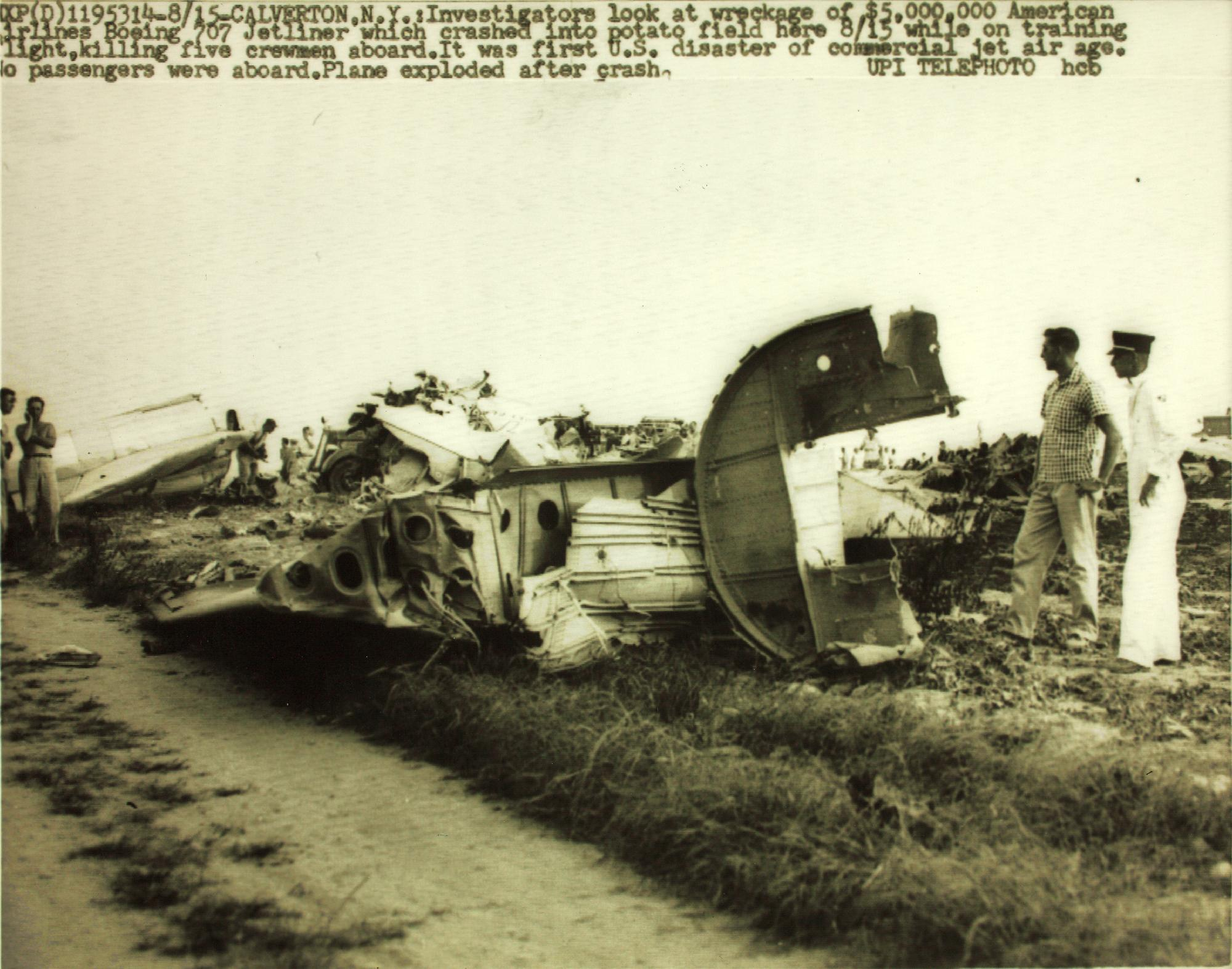
- The wreckage of N7514A at the crash site

Accident
- Date: August 15, 1959
- Summary: Loss of control due to improper flight controls
- Site: Calverton, New York, US; 40°56′42.83″N 72°46′45.57″W
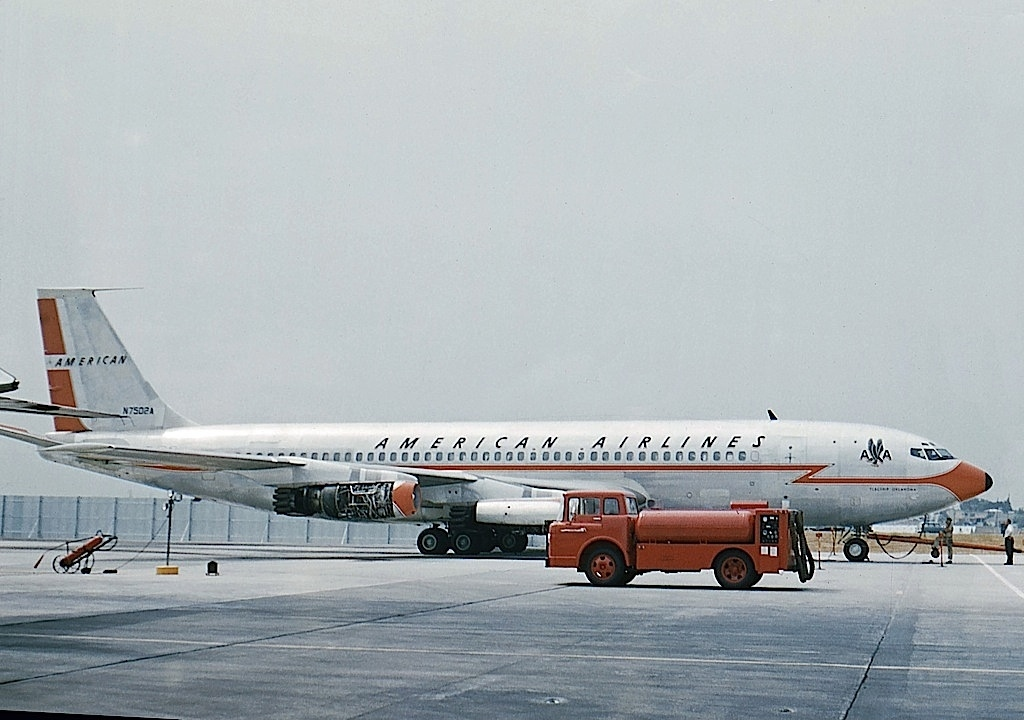
- An American Airlines Boeing 707-123, similar to the aircraft involved. This aircraft would later crash as American Airlines Flight 1502.
- Aircraft name: Flagship Connecticut
- Operator: American Airlines
- Call sign: American 514
- Registration: N7514A
- Flight origin: Idlewild International Airport
- Destination: Calverton Executive Airpark
- Occupants: 5
- Crew: 5
- Fatalities: 5
- Survivors: 0

American Airlines Flight 514 was a training flight from Idlewild International Airport in Queens, New York, to the Grumman Aircraft Corporation airfield in Calverton, New York. On the afternoon of August 15, 1959, the Boeing 707 operating the flight crashed near the Calverton airport, killing all five crew members aboard. This was the first accident to involve a Boeing 707, which had only gone into service in October of the previous year, and the first of three accidents involving American's 707s in the New York area within three years, followed by Flight 1502 and Flight 1.

== Aircraft ==
The aircraft was a Boeing 707-123 with registration N7514A, nicknamed "Flagship Connecticut". The aircraft in question's first flight was earlier in the year, and when the crash occurred, it had accumulated 736 total flight hours. The 707s had gone into service with American on January 25, 1959, with flights from New York to Los Angeles.

The Calverton airfield was used frequently by American Airlines for training purposes for crew members on 707s, and was known then as the Grumman Aircraft Corp. field.

== Crew ==
There were five people on board the aircraft. Captain Harry Clinton Job acted as the instructor for the flight, with Captains Fred W. Jeberjahn and William T. Swain on board as captain trainees, and Flight Engineer Arthur Anderson acted as the instructor for flight engineer trainee Allen Freeman. When the 707 departed Idlewild, Jeberjahn was in the captain's seat, Job occupied the first officer's seat, Swain was in the second officer's seat, Freeman occupied the engineer's seat and Anderson took the jump seat.

== Crash ==
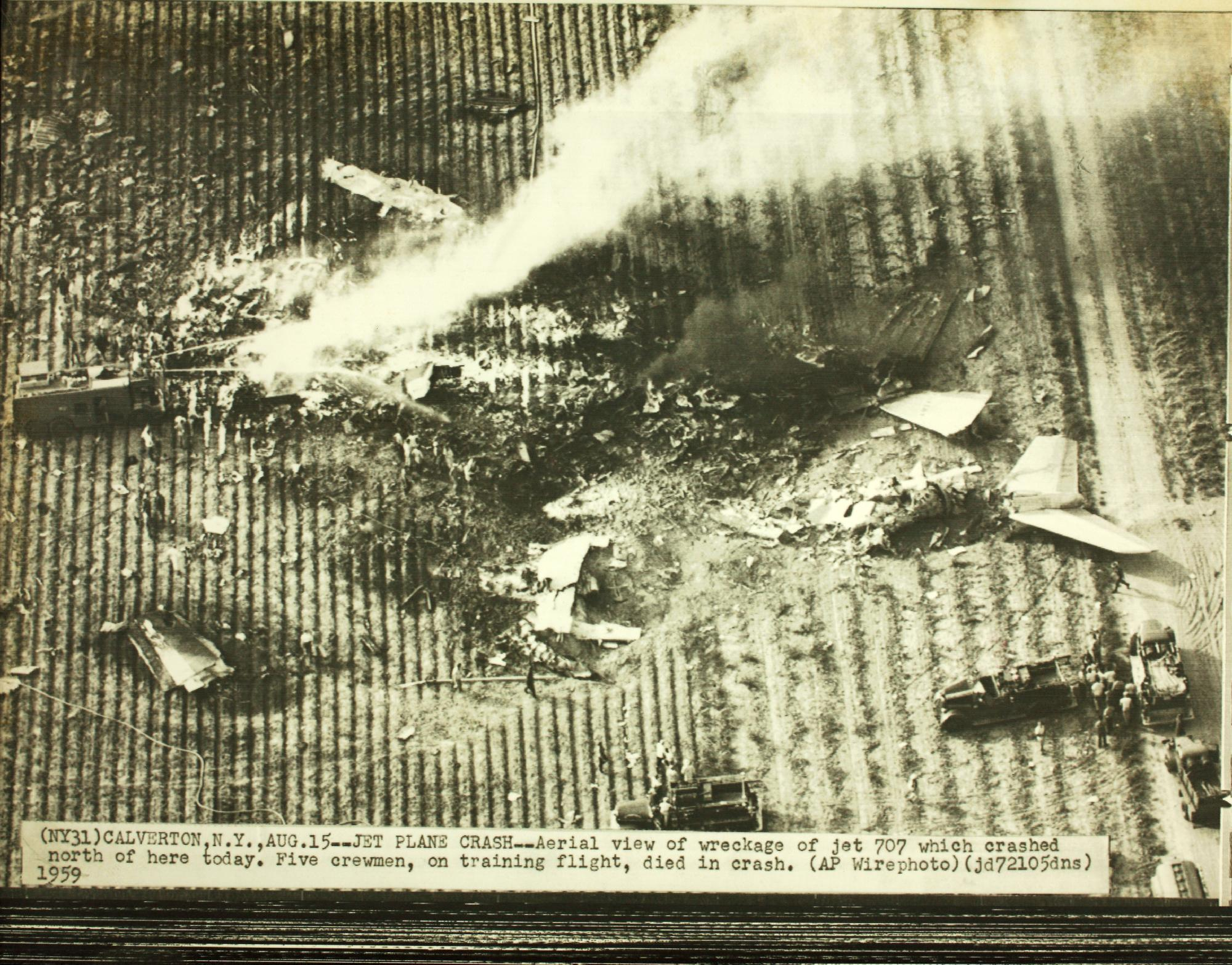
The still smoldering remains of Flight 514. Notably visible are the vertical and horizontal stabilizers.

The 707 departed Idlewild at 1:40pm, accomplished high altitude air work after takeoff to permit sufficient fuel burn-off for airport transition training which was planned at Calverton, and arrived there around 3:11pm. Flight 514 accomplished several maneuvers, including full-stop landings, crosswind landings and takeoffs, a high off-set approach, simulated engine out landings, and a no-flap aborted approach to landing. The aircraft did not retract its landing gear following the last aborted approach to landing on Runway 23, but continued in the traffic pattern at an estimated altitude between 1,000 and 1,100 feet (300 and 340 m). The crew reported on left base leg for Runway 23, was given clearance to land, and was informed that the wind was from 230 degrees at 10 to 15 knots (12 to 17 mph; 19 to 28 km/h). As it approached the extended centerline of the runway, around 4:42pm, it made a left bank that reached approximately 45 degrees. The aircraft was then observed to recover immediately to level flight and to begin a bank to the right which became progressively steeper. The right bank continued until the aircraft was inverted, at which time the nose dropped and a yaw to the left was observed. The 707 then continued to roll to the right in a nose down configuration. Shortly before impact, the wings leveled one final time. Investigation revealed the aircraft struck the ground in a wings-level attitude, in a nearly stalled condition, yawed to the left approximately 12 degrees, with considerable and nearly symmetrical power. The aircraft crashed in a potato field, a fire erupted on impact, and all five aboard were killed. The crash occurred only a few miles from the Brookhaven National Laboratories, a site of key secret nuclear work.

The fire continued to burn for over an hour after the crash, hampering emergency crews in their efforts to remove the bodies of the crew. The Air Force sent several pieces of fire equipment to the scene. Eventually, a large crowd gathered at the crash site as word spread over radio and television newscasts, and people drove from resorts and towns in the area to see the wreckage. The crash followed a series of 707 emergencies, none involving fatalities, in recent weeks involving passenger flights, the first occurring on February 3, 1959, when a Pan Am 707 nose dived over the Atlantic and landed safely in Gander, the same day another American Airlines flight crashed in New York City. The incident with the Pan Am flight was followed by four landing gear breakdowns on jets operated by Pan Am and American Airlines.

== Cause ==
The probable cause suggested was that "the crew failed to recognize and correct the development of excessive yaw which caused an unintentional rolling maneuver at an altitude too low to permit complete recovery." Subsequent to the accident, the Federal Aviation Agency (FAA) discontinued the requirement that Boeing 707 aircraft make actual landings with simulated failure of 50 percent of the power units concentrated on one side of the aircraft during training flights, type ratings, and proficiency checks. Subsequently, these maneuvers could be simulated at an appropriate higher altitude. On February 5, 1960, Boeing issued a service bulletin for an improved rudder modification which adds boost power to the wider ranges of directional movement, and gives increased control capability at low airspeeds and minimum gross weight. This modification also replaces the original rudder with an improved version.

== Aftermath ==
The crash of Flight 514 was reconsidered when, in January 1961, another American Airlines 707 on a training flight crashed off of Montauk Point in New York. Consideration was given to the fact that at the time of both accidents, the crews were practicing engine out procedures. As a result of this speculation, the FAA removed the requirement for all 707 flight crews to practice landings with two failed engines on the same wing.

== See also ==
- List of accidents and incidents involving commercial aircraft
- List of accidents and incidents involving the Boeing 707
- American Airlines Flight 1, another American Airlines 707 crash in New York that happened three years later.
- Sabena Flight 548, the first commercial accident involving a Boeing 707.
