= 1983 TAMPA Colombia Boeing 707 crash =

Aviation accident

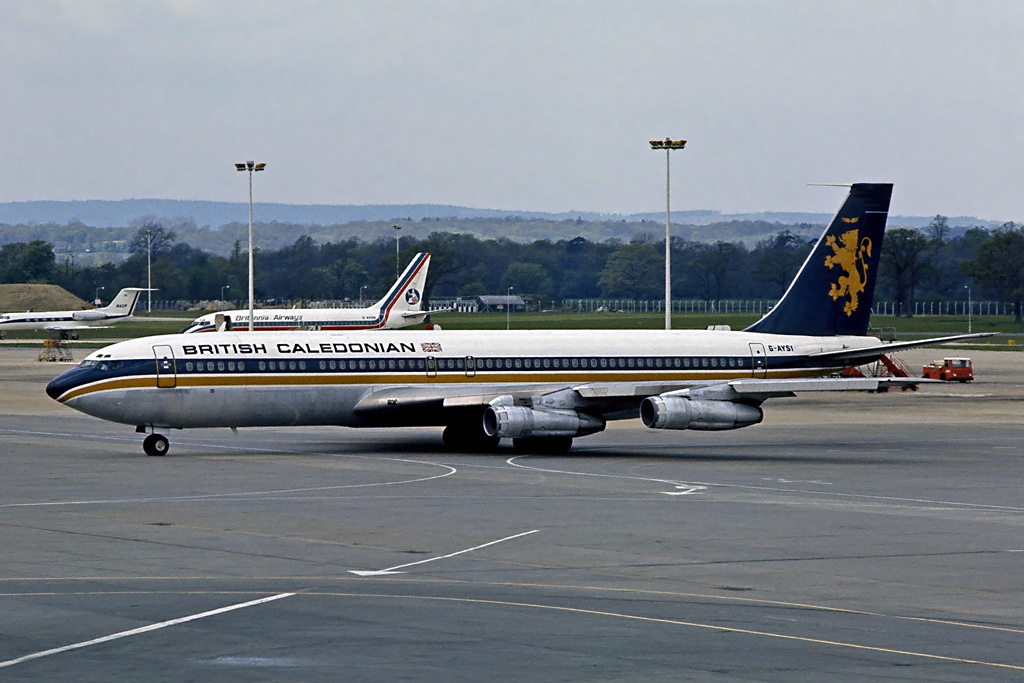
- The aircraft involved in the accident, while in service with British Caledonian in 1973.

Accident
- Date: December 14, 1983
- Summary: Engine failure on takeoff leading to loss of control
- Site: Olaya Herrera Airport, Medellín, Colombia; 6°12′49.1″N 75°35′41″W
- Total fatalities: 25
- Total injuries: 15

Aircraft
- Aircraft type: Boeing 707-373C
- Operator: TAMPA Colombia
- Registration: HK-2401X
- Flight origin: Olaya Herrera Airport, Medellín, Colombia
- Destination: Miami International Airport, Miami, Florida, United States
- Passengers: 0
- Crew: 3
- Fatalities: 3
- Survivors: 0

Ground casualties
- Ground fatalities: 22
- Ground injuries: 15

The 1983 Tampa Colombia Boeing 707 crash took place on December 14, 1983, when a TAMPA Colombia Boeing 707 crashed after taking off from Olaya Herrera Airport in Medellín, Colombia on a ferry flight, killing all three people on board and 22 more people on the ground.

== Aircraft ==
The aircraft involved in the accident was a Boeing 707-373C with serial number 18707. The aircraft's maiden flight was in 1963, and it was delivered to World Airways as N375WA the same year. It was then operated by Britannia Airways, and British Caledonian as G-AYSI. In 1976, the aircraft was leased to Singapore Airlines for two months. The aircraft was then transferred to International Air Leases as N3751Y, who leased the aircraft to TAMPA Colombia in 1980.

== Accident ==
On the morning of December 14, 1983, the aircraft was scheduled to operate a flight from Medellín to Miami. During takeoff the no. 4 (outer right) engine ingested foreign objects. The aircraft returned to Medellín where mechanics assessed the damage. They decided the aircraft would be ferried to Miami for repairs. The cargo was unloaded in preparation for the ferry flight.

Eight hours later, the aircraft took off with the no 4 engine idle. During the second takeoff attempt the no. 3 (inner right) engine failed. The aircraft banked to the right and crashed into a factory. All three crew members and 22 people on the ground were killed, while 15 more people on the ground were injured.

== See also ==
- Transbrasil Flight 801
