= K2 Airways =

Pakistani cargo airline

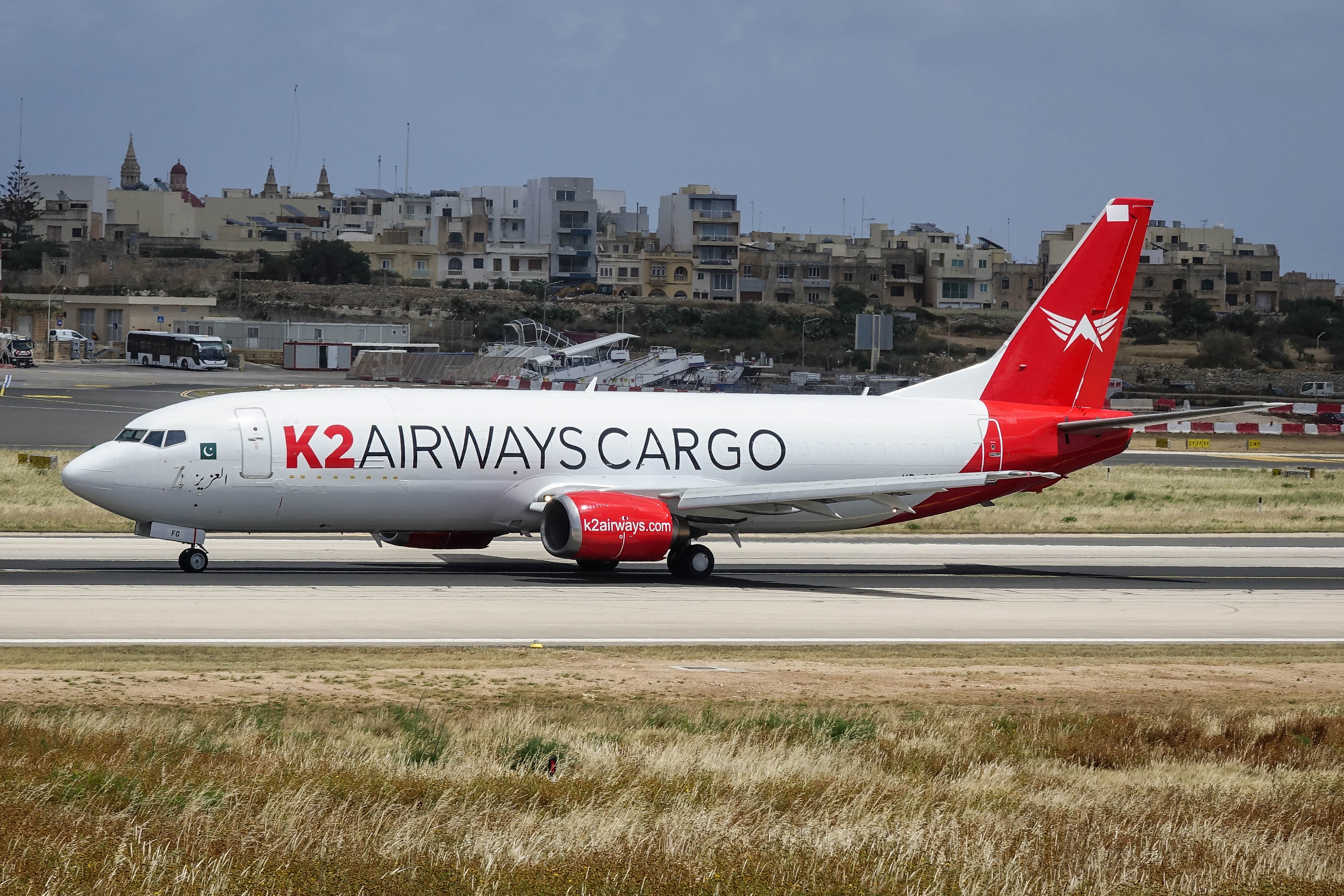
- K2 Airways Boeing 737-400SF
IATA	ICAO	Call sign
K2	KTA	CITY LINK
- Founded: 2018; 8 years ago
- Commenced operations: 2024; 2 years ago
- Ceased operations: July 7, 2026; 3 months ago
- Operating bases: Karachi
- Destinations: 6
- Headquarters: Office 4024, 4th Floor, Jinnah International Airport, Karachi-Pakistan
- Key people: Tariq Raja (CEO)
- Website: www.k2airways.com

K2 Airways was a Pakistani cargo airline based in Karachi, Pakistan. The airline was established in 2018 and operated scheduled and charter cargo services on domestic and international routes. It received its air operator's certificate from the Pakistan Civil Aviation Authority in December 2024. The airline ceased operations after its sole aircraft, a Boeing 737-400, crashed into the Arabian Sea on 7 July 2026 while operating as K2 Airways Flight 1732.

== History ==
The airline was first founded in 2018, later opening its social media campaign in 2019.

In early 2023, almost 5 years after the airline was first founded, it stated that it intended to begin passenger flight operations with E190 aircraft, which would be the first airline in Pakistan to operate Embraer aircraft. The plan was however mulled in late 2023 as the aircraft lessor was not able to provide the airline with a second aircraft.

In July 2024, K2 Airways received its first aircraft, a cargo converted B737-4M0(BDSF), which was registered in Pakistan as AP-BOI.

K2 Airways received its air operator's certificate on December 20, 2024, and subsequently began flight operations a week later on December 27, launching its inaugural flight from Karachi to Lahore.

On 16 August 2026, it was reported that the airline had allowed its insurance to expire several weeks prior to the crash of Flight 1732. This finding, along with the loss of the company's sole aircraft in the crash, resulted in K2 Airways operations being suspended indefinitely.

== Destinations ==
As of January 2026, K2 Airways flew to the following destinations:

Country	City	Airport	Notes
China	Kashgar	Kashgar Laining International Airport	Terminated
Pakistan	Lahore	Allama Iqbal International Airport	Terminated
Pakistan	Karachi	Jinnah International Airport	Terminated
United Arab Emirates	Dubai	Al Maktoum International Airport	Terminated
United Arab Emirates	Sharjah	Sharjah International Airport	Terminated
Uzbekistan	Navoi	Navoi International Airport	Terminated

== Former Fleet ==
On 7 July 2026, K2 Airways' only aircraft crashed into the Arabian Sea while operating K2 Airways Flight 1732.

K2 Airways fleet
Aircraft	In service	Orders	Historical	Notes
Boeing 737-400(BDSF)	0	0	1	Crashed as K2 Airways Flight 1732

== Accidents and incidents ==
- On 7 July 2026, at around 9:18 PM PST, K2 Airways’ only aircraft, a 27 year old Boeing 737-4M0(BDSF) (registered as AP-BOI) aircraft, was operating K2 Airways Flight 1732 from Sharjah to Karachi. It crashed into the Arabian Sea following a presumed navigation systems issue.

== See also ==
- List of airlines of Pakistan
- Pakistan International Airlines
- FlyJinnah
