= K2 Airways Flight 1732 =

2026 aviation accident in the Arabian Sea

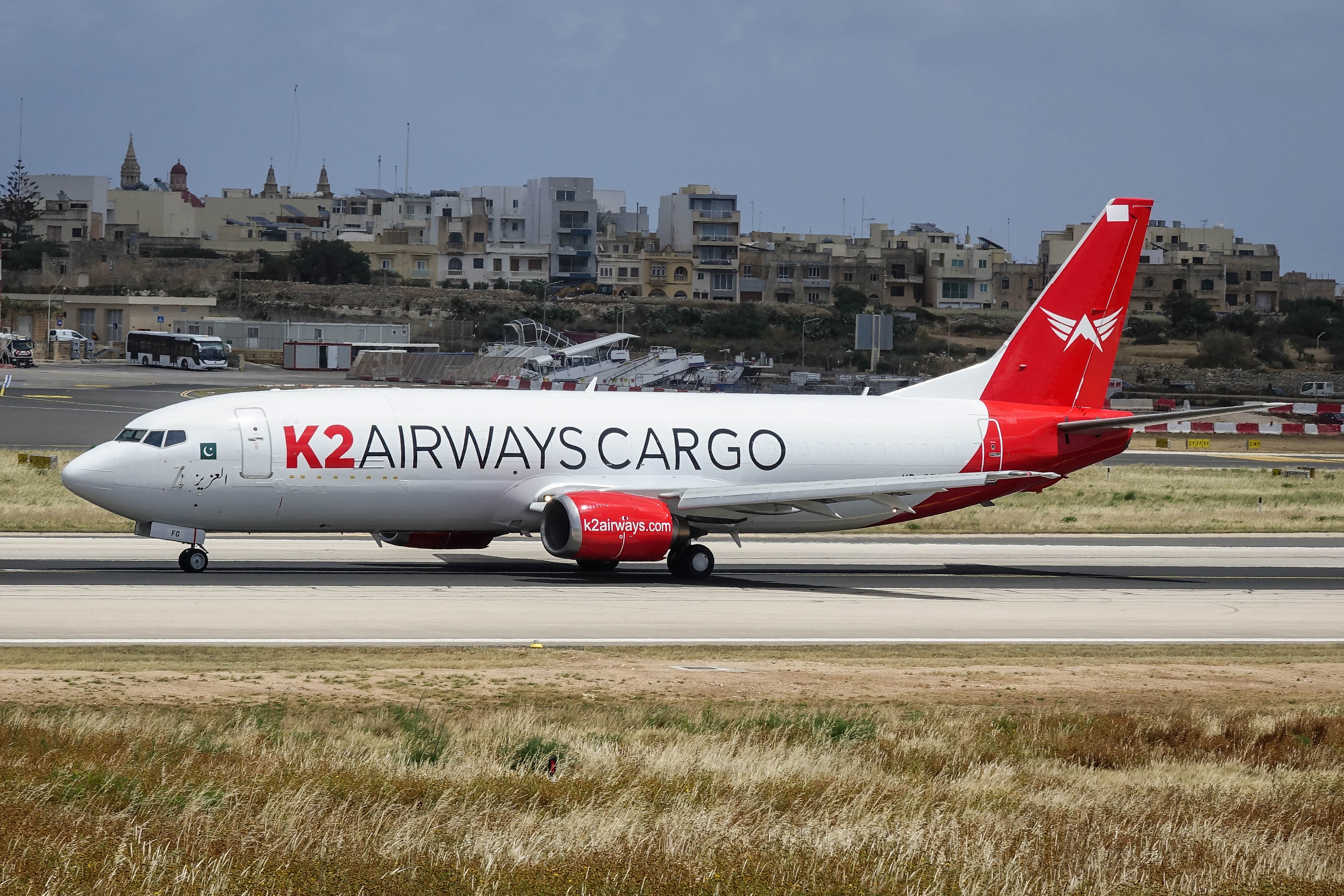
- The aircraft involved in the accident, pictured with a previous registration in 2024

Accident
- Date: 7 July 2026
- Summary: Crashed into the ocean; under investigation
- Site: Arabian Sea; near Ormara, Pakistan

Aircraft
- Aircraft type: Boeing 737-4M0(BDSF)
- Aircraft name: Al-Aziz
- Operator: K2 Airways
- IATA flight No.: K21732
- ICAO flight No.: KTA1732
- Call sign: CITY LINK 1732
- Registration: AP-BOI
- Flight origin: Sharjah International Airport, Sharjah, United Arab Emirates
- Destination: Jinnah International Airport, Karachi, Pakistan
- Occupants: 5
- Crew: 5
- Fatalities: 5
- Survivors: 0

K2 Airways Flight 1732 was a scheduled international cargo flight operated by K2 Airways from Sharjah International Airport in Sharjah, United Arab Emirates, to Jinnah International Airport in Karachi, Pakistan. On 7 July 2026, the Boeing 737-400 freighter crashed in the Arabian Sea following a reported malfunction of navigation systems.. After 12 hours of search and rescue operations, the wreckage was discovered 53 nautical miles from the coast of Ormara, Pakistan. All five crew members on board were killed. (Note: No remains of the crew have been found.)

According to the Pakistan Airports Authority, the flight crew reported a navigational system malfunction at approximately 9:18 pm local time while roughly 155 nautical miles from Karachi. Controllers provided navigational guidance, but three minutes later at 9:21 pm, radar showed the aircraft executing a rapid descent and significant heading change. Subsequent radar and radio contact were lost. Preliminary automatic dependent surveillance-broadcast (ADS-B) data obtained by flight tracking service Flightradar24 suggested a possible crash location in the Arabian Sea southwest of Karachi.

== Background ==
=== Aircraft ===
The aircraft, a 27-year-old Boeing 737-4M0(BDSF) cargo aircraft, was the sole aircraft operated by K2 Airways and was equipped with two CFM56-3C1 engines. The aircraft was first delivered to Aeroflot in 1999 and leased to Garuda Indonesia in 2004 (as PK-GZO), before being converted into a freighter aircraft in 2011 for GE Capital Aviation Services, which then leased it to TNT Airways in 2012 and to ASL Airlines Belgium (operating for FedEx Express) in 2017. In 2024, the aircraft was acquired by AerCap and leased to K2 Airways.

=== Flight crew ===
The flight was operated by a crew of five: pilot-in-command Captain Muhammed Rizwan Idrees, co-pilot First Officer Faisal Jatoi, Loadmaster Towfiq Khan and Engineers Arif Siddiqui and Mohammed Hamid.

== Accident ==
On 7 July 2026, K2 Airways Flight 1732 was operating from Sharjah International Airport in the United Arab Emirates to Jinnah International Airport, Karachi, Pakistan. At around 9:18 p.m. PKT, while flying over the Arabian Sea, the crew reported a navigational system issue to Air Traffic Control. Air traffic controllers assisted the flight crew until they lost communication and radar contact approximately three minutes later, about 155 nmi (178 mi; 287 km) west of Karachi. The aircraft was carrying five crew members.

The final known radio communication from the flight was made with the Karachi Area Control Centre (ACC) shortly before the aircraft disappeared over the Arabian Sea. According to reports, the crew transmitted the phrase "rolling or floating, 1732" during the communication. The transmission was recorded in flight records and was reported as the last known message from the aircraft before radar and communication contact were lost.

According to ADS-B data from Flightradar24, the aircraft began to descend from its cruising altitude of 35,000 feet at around 9:18 p.m., reaching 29,500 feet. It then rapidly climbed to 36,675 feet before beginning to descend. The aircraft's last ADS-B broadcast was at 9:20:27, at an altitude of 34,350 feet. Satellite data, also from Flightradar24, collected a final data point at 9:21:59, which placed the aircraft at an altitude of 1,100 feet with a vertical speed of -22,400 feet per minute.

== Aftermath ==
The Pakistan Navy ship PNS Zulfiquar (F251) and the PNSC Karachi as well as a Pakistan Air Force Saab 2000 Erieye AEW&C and Pakistan Navy RAS-72 Sea Eagle undertook a search for the missing aircraft. Rough seas and the incoming monsoon season are making the search-and-rescue operation more difficult.

According to the Pakistan Civil Aviation Authority, some wreckage was recovered 53 nmi (61 mi; 98 km) of the coast of Ormara 12 hours after the aircraft was reported missing. The search continues for the five crew members and the aircraft's flight recorders.

On 29 September 2026, after months of search, the Pakistan Navy located an aircraft flight recorder at a depth of 3200 meters in the Arabian Sea. The operation was one of the first of its kind, and was made by using special sea equipment developed by the National Engineering and Scientific Commission. The informations that are being collected are being sent to aviation authorities.

== Reactions ==
Prime Minister Shehbaz Sharif expressed grief over the incident and conveyed sympathies to the families of the five crew members. He directed relevant authorities, including the Pakistan Civil Aviation Authority, Pakistan Navy and Pakistan Air Force, to intensify search and rescue operations and use available resources in the effort.

President Asif Ali Zardari expressed concern over the disappearance of the aircraft and expressed hope for the success of the search and rescue operation. In a statement issued by the Aiwan-e-Sadr, he conveyed condolences to the families of the crew members and expressed support for them following the incident.

K2 Airways said it was cooperating with authorities during the search operation and expressed concern for the safety of the crew members. The airline also offered support to the families of those on board.

The families of the crew members criticised K2 Airways over what they described as a lack of communication following the crash, stating that the airline had not contacted them or provided updates or support. They called on Prime Minister Shehbaz Sharif to ensure the continuation of deep-sea search and recovery operations, order an independent and transparent investigation into the crash, and take legal action if negligence was established.

== See also ==
- List of accidents and incidents involving the Boeing 737
- List of fatal accidents involving commercial cargo aircraft
- List of unrecovered and unusable flight recorders
