= 2019 Saha Airlines Boeing 707 crash =

2019 aviation accident in Iran

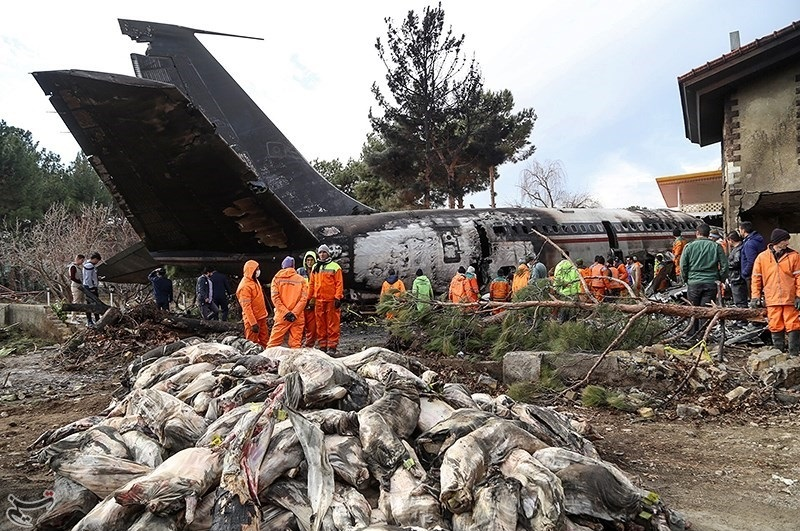
- Wreckage of the aircraft

Accident
- Date: 14 January 2019
- Summary: Runway overrun
- Site: Fath Air Base, Alborz province, Iran; 35°43′15″N 50°55′37″E

Aircraft
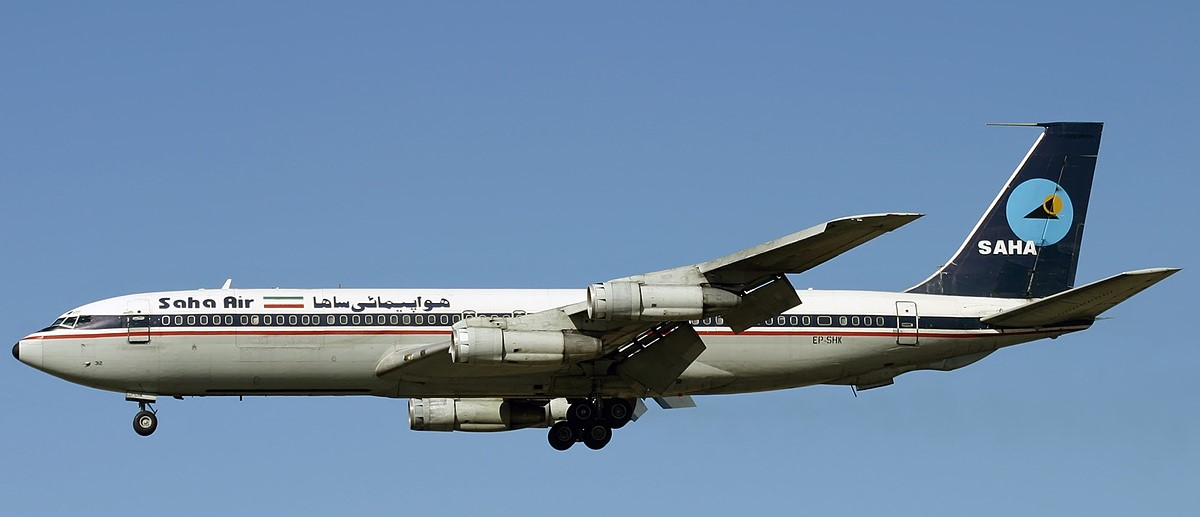
- The aircraft involved in the accident, seen in 2009 with a previous registration and livery
- Aircraft type: Boeing 707-3J9C
- Operator: Saha Airlines
- Registration: EP-CPP
- Flight origin: Manas International Airport, Bishkek, Kyrgyzstan
- Destination: Payam International Airport, Karaj, Iran
- Occupants: 16
- Crew: 16
- Fatalities: 15
- Injuries: 1 (Severely)
- Survivors: 1

On 14 January 2019, a Boeing 707 operated by Saha Airlines on a cargo flight crashed at Fath Air Base, near Karaj, Alborz province in Iran. The aircraft was the last civil Boeing 707 in operation.

== Aircraft ==
The aircraft involved was a Boeing 707-3J9C, c/n 21128, registration EP-CPP. The aircraft was owned by the Islamic Republic of Iran Air Force and had been leased to Saha Airlines. The aircraft was 42 years old at the time. The aircraft had first flown on 19 November 1976, and was delivered that month to the Imperial Iranian Air Force as 5–8312. It had been transferred to Saha Airlines on 27 February 2000, and was re-registered EP-SHK. It was substantially damaged by an uncontained engine failure on 3 August 2009, whilst on a flight from Ahvaz International Airport to Mehrabad International Airport, Tehran. An emergency landing was made at Ahvaz; the aircraft was subsequently repaired. It was returned to the IRIAF in December 2015 and returned to Saha Airlines in May 2016, registered EP-CPP.

== Accident ==
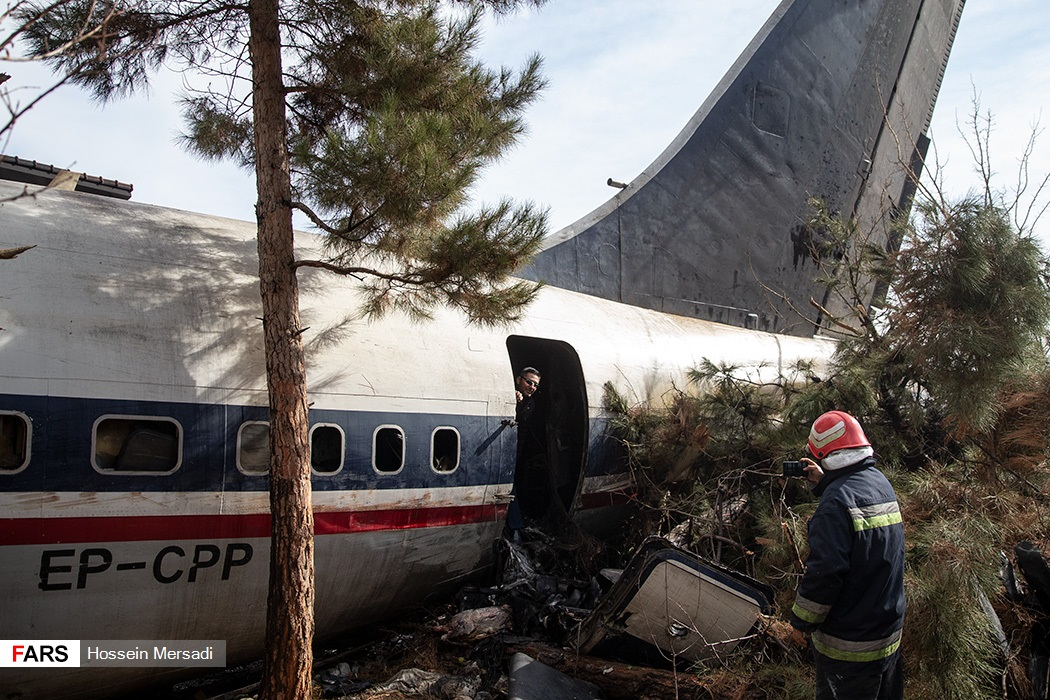
Tail wreckage of EP-CPP

The aircraft was on an international cargo flight carrying meat from Manas International Airport in Bishkek, Kyrgyzstan, to Payam International Airport in Karaj, Iran, but the flight crew actually landed at Fath Air Base. The crew probably mistook Fath Air Base's runway for the much longer Payam International Airport runway, as the two runways are just a few kilometres apart and on a similar alignment. A 707 generally requires a runway length more than 2,500 m (8,200 ft), but the runway at Fath Air Base is only 1,300 metres (4,300 ft). Poor weather conditions were also reported.

The aircraft overran the runway, crashed through a wall, and came to rest after colliding with a house in the neighbourhood of Farrokhabad, Fardis County, Alborz province. The accident was captured on Security footage and shows the plane as it crashes and bursts into flames. The houses involved were empty at the time of the crash, and no one on the ground was injured. Fifteen of the sixteen crew on board were killed; one crew member survived, but was seriously injured. There were no passengers. Following the crash, a fire developed. Early reports gave the number of people on board as either 16 or 17, all but one of whom died. The sole survivor was Farshad Mahdavinejad, the aircraft's flight engineer, who was taken to Shariati Hospital in a critical condition.

In a possibly related incident from 16 November 2018, a Taban Airlines MD-88 carrying 155 people twice attempted to land on this runway, mistaking it for the longer 3,659 metres (12,005 ft) Payam runway, which is nearly inline. On the first approach the plane reached an altitude of 1 metre (3.3 ft) before aborting the attempt, but eventually continued on for a safe landing at Payam after an aborted second attempt there.

== Investigation ==
An investigation was opened into the accident. The cockpit voice recorder was recovered from the wreckage on 14 January. The flight data recorder and the control display unit were also recovered.

On 28 February, AIRAC Cycle 02/2019 was released with all approach charts for Payam Airport having been modified to show Fath Airport along with the following note: "Do not mistake Fath and Naja Airports for Payam Airport which have similar runway alignments."

== See also ==
- List of accidents and incidents involving the Boeing 707
- List of accidents and incidents involving airliners by airline (P–Z)
- List of aviation accidents and incidents with a sole survivor
- Spantax flight on 31 May 1967, whose pilot (and CEO) mistook the tiny runway of Finkenwerder for Hamburg Airport
- TAM Airlines Flight 3054
