= American Airlines Flight 1502 =

1961 aviation accident in Suffolk County, New York

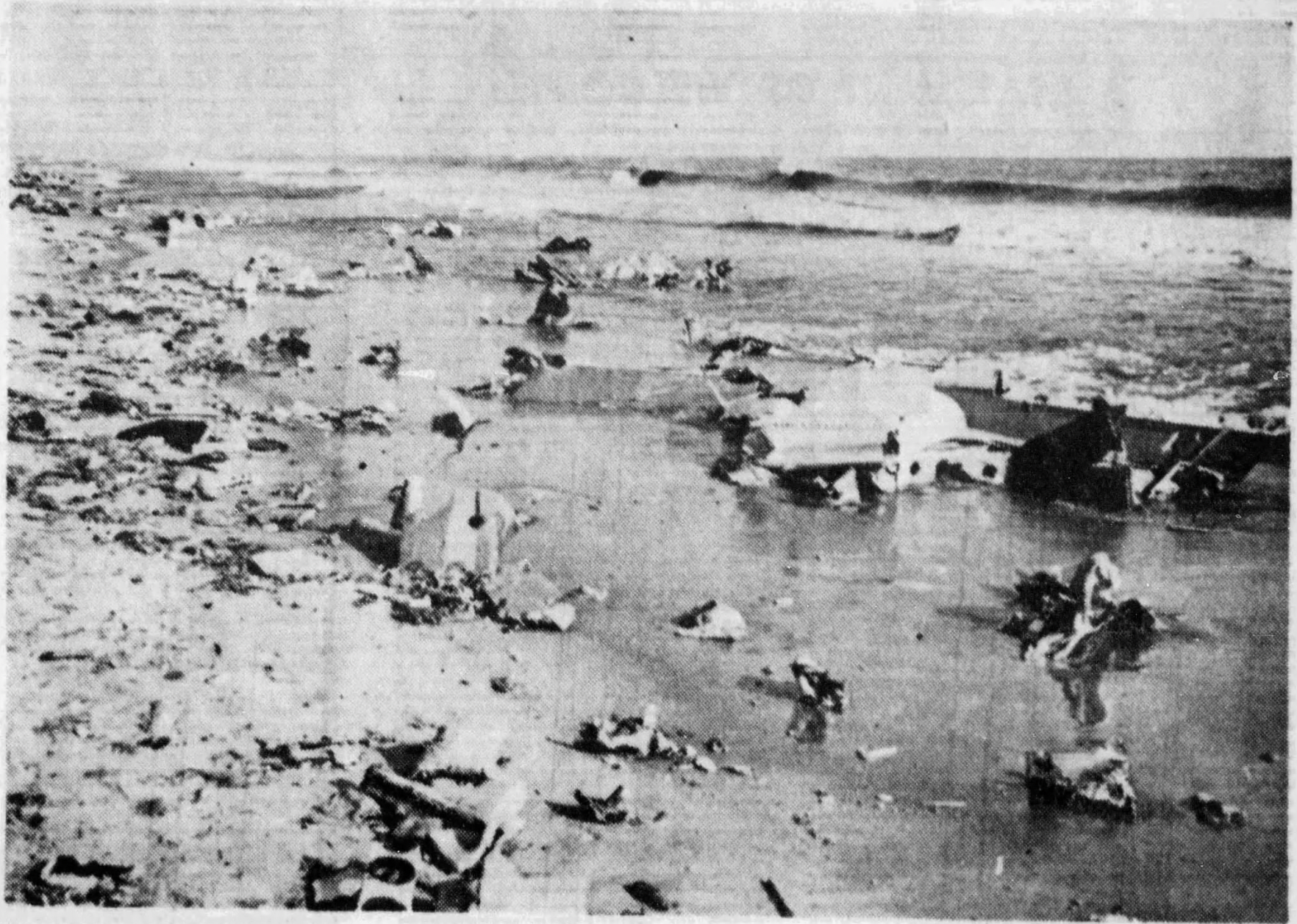
- The wreckage of the aircraft strewn across a beach

Accident
- Date: January 28, 1961
- Summary: Loss of control due to unknown circumstances
- Site: Atlantic Ocean, 9.5 miles (15.3 km) off of Montauk Point, New York, United States; 41°3′42″N 72°2′20″W

Aircraft
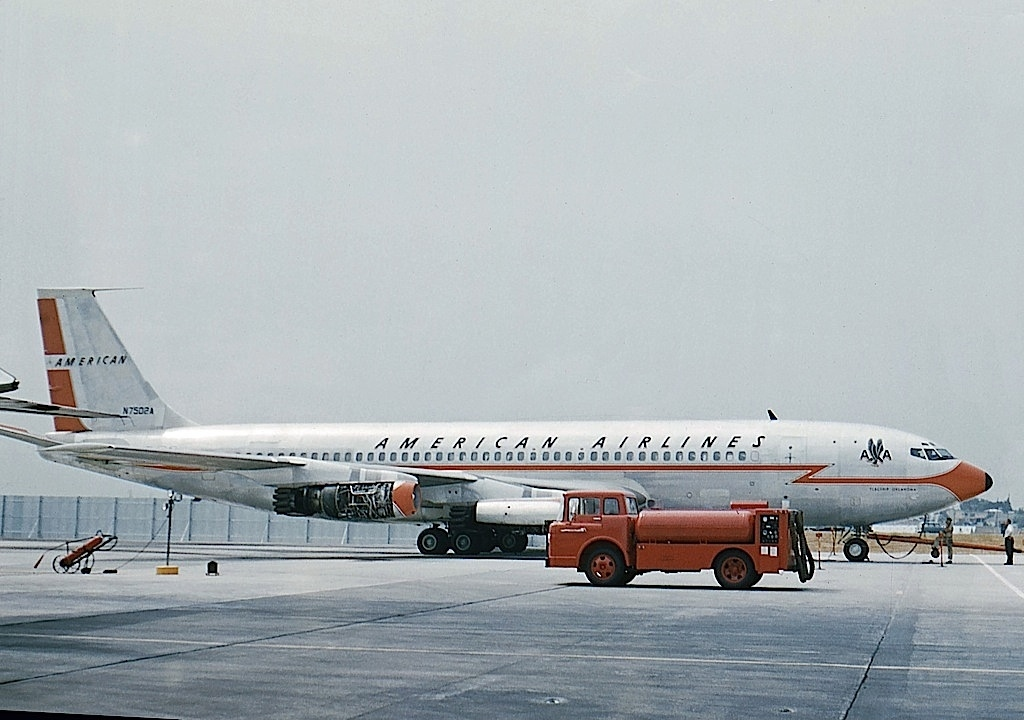
- N7502A, the aircraft involved, at Los Angeles International Airport in 1958.
- Aircraft type: Boeing 707-123 Jet Flagship
- Aircraft name: Flagship Oklahoma
- Operator: American Airlines
- Call sign: AMERICAN 1502
- Registration: N7502A
- Flight origin: Idlewild International Airport, New York
- Destination: Idlewild International Airport, New York
- Occupants: 6
- Crew: 6
- Fatalities: 6
- Survivors: 0

American Airlines Flight 1502 was a crew training flight from Idlewild International Airport (now John F. Kennedy International Airport). On January 28, 1961, the Boeing 707 operating the flight crashed out of control into the Atlantic Ocean 9.5 miles (15.3 km) west of Montauk Point, New York, and all six crew on board were killed. The cause of the crash was never officially determined. Flight 1502 would be the second of three 707s that American lost in a three-year period in the New York area.

== Aircraft and crew ==
The aircraft was a Boeing 707-123, registered in the United States as N7502A and named Flagship Oklahoma. First flown on November 2, 1958, it was delivered new to American Airlines on January 23, 1959. The aircraft was valued at approximately $5 million.

The crew on board the flight were captains Lloyd Dute Reinhard, with Robert Hinman, John B. Coyne, Herbert J. Thing, Jr., flight instructor Harald Engh, and trainee Howard Loren Sturdy.

== Accident ==
Flight 1502 departed Idlewild Airport into clear skies at 11:00 a.m. EDT (UTC−4), with Captain Reinhard at the yoke. 57 minutes later, the aircraft made its last radio contact.

At 12:20 p.m. EDT (UTC−4), Airman First Class James F. Ross was driving on the Montauk Highway and caught Flight 1502 passing overhead at an estimated 100 feet (30 m), in a 60–70° dive. Ross pulled his car to the side of the highway as the 707 disappeared behind sand dunes. Also present on the highway was Captain Frank Ward, a local fisherman from Montauk who said the aircraft did multiple rolls, straightening out before impact, and that an engine was reportedly on fire. In a steep, left wing low attitude, Flight 1502 crashed into the shallow waters off of Napeague Beach, killing the six occupants. Emergency crews rushed to the scene to find the aircraft extensively fragmented, with some seats reportedly split in half by the force of the crash. The crash was the fourth involving a modern jetliner in the New York metropolitan area in the past two years, amounting to a total 149 lives lost. This included what was at the time the world's deadliest aviation disaster, the 1960 New York mid-air collision, that only occurred the previous month.

== Cause ==
When the accident occurred, the crew could have been engaged in an engine shutdown and restart, a canyon approach, or en route to engine-climb maneuvers. Canyon-approach procedures require a flap-setting of 30 degrees, and the wreckage seemed to corroborate this setting. However, the evidence was inconclusive to find a cause for the loss of control. As such, the FAA officially gave a probable cause as "A loss of control for an undetermined reason". Additionally, there was consideration that two engines were inoperative at impact, but this could not be conclusively proven. As a result of this speculation, and the crash of another American Airlines 707 on a training flight over Long Island in 1959, the FAA removed the requirement for all 707 flight crews to practice landings with two failed engines on the same wing.

== See also ==
- American Airlines Flight 514 – another American Airlines 707 training flight that crashed on Long Island in 1959
- 1960 New York mid-air collision – at the time, the deadliest aviation accident in history, which occurred only a month before the crash of Flight 1502
- American Airlines Flight 1 – another American Airlines 707 that crashed after takeoff from Idlewild in 1962
- XL Airways Germany Flight 888T – a training flight that also resulted in a crash in 2008
