= Fath Air Base =

Iranian airfield

- IATA: none; ICAO: OIIF

Summary
- Operator: Iranian Revolutionary Guard Corps Aerospace Force
- Serves: Karaj
- Elevation AMSL: 3,999 ft (1,219 m)
- Coordinates: 35°43′02″N 50°56′07″E
- Interactive map of Fath Air Base

Runways
Direction	Length		Surface
Direction	ft	m	Surface
13/31	3,281	981	Asphalt

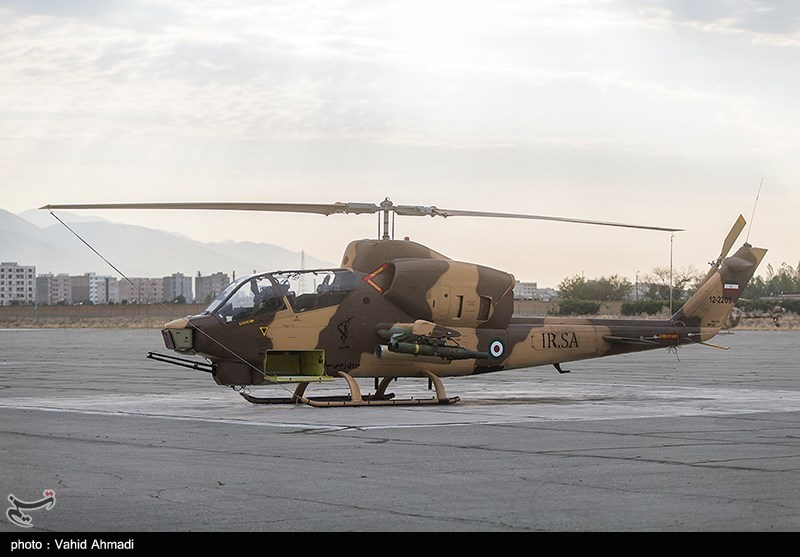
The Commander in Chief of the IRGC visiting Faith Airbase, 20 July 2020

Fath Air Base (ICAO: OIIF) is a military airfield near Karaj, Alborz Province, Iran.

== Location ==
Fath Air Base is located near Karaj, Alborz Province, Iran. The airport is at an elevation of 3,999 feet (1,219 m) and has an asphalt runway, 3,218 feet (981 m) long, designated 13/31,. It is mainly used as a base for helicopters of the Helicopter Training Squadron, Attack Helicopter Squadron and Training & Recce Helicopter Squadron of the Iranian Revolutionary Guard Corps Aerospace Force.

== Accidents and incidents ==
On 14 January 2019, a Boeing 707 of Saha Airlines overran the runway on landing, killing fifteen of the sixteen people on board. It was reported that the aircraft should have landed at Payam International Airport but landed at Fath in error. Payam is located 10.9 kilometres (5.9 nmi) northwest of Fath Air Base.

A crash was avoided in a similar incident on 16 November 2018, when a Taban Airlines MD-88 carrying 155 people twice attempted to land on this runway, mistaking it for a longer 3,659-metre (12,005 ft) runway at Payam International Airport, which is nearly inline but 11 km away. The first approach was aborted at 11:26 hours and the aircraft circled for another attempt. The second approach was aborted at 11:29 and the aircraft continued for a safe landing at Payam Airport at 11:31. AAID Iran reported that the flight reached an altitude of 1 m above ground level during one of the approaches. The MD-88 requires a minimum of approximately 1,500 m of runway to land safely, 519 m more than the 981 m runway at Fath Air Base.
