= Transbrasil Flight 801 =

1989 aviation accident

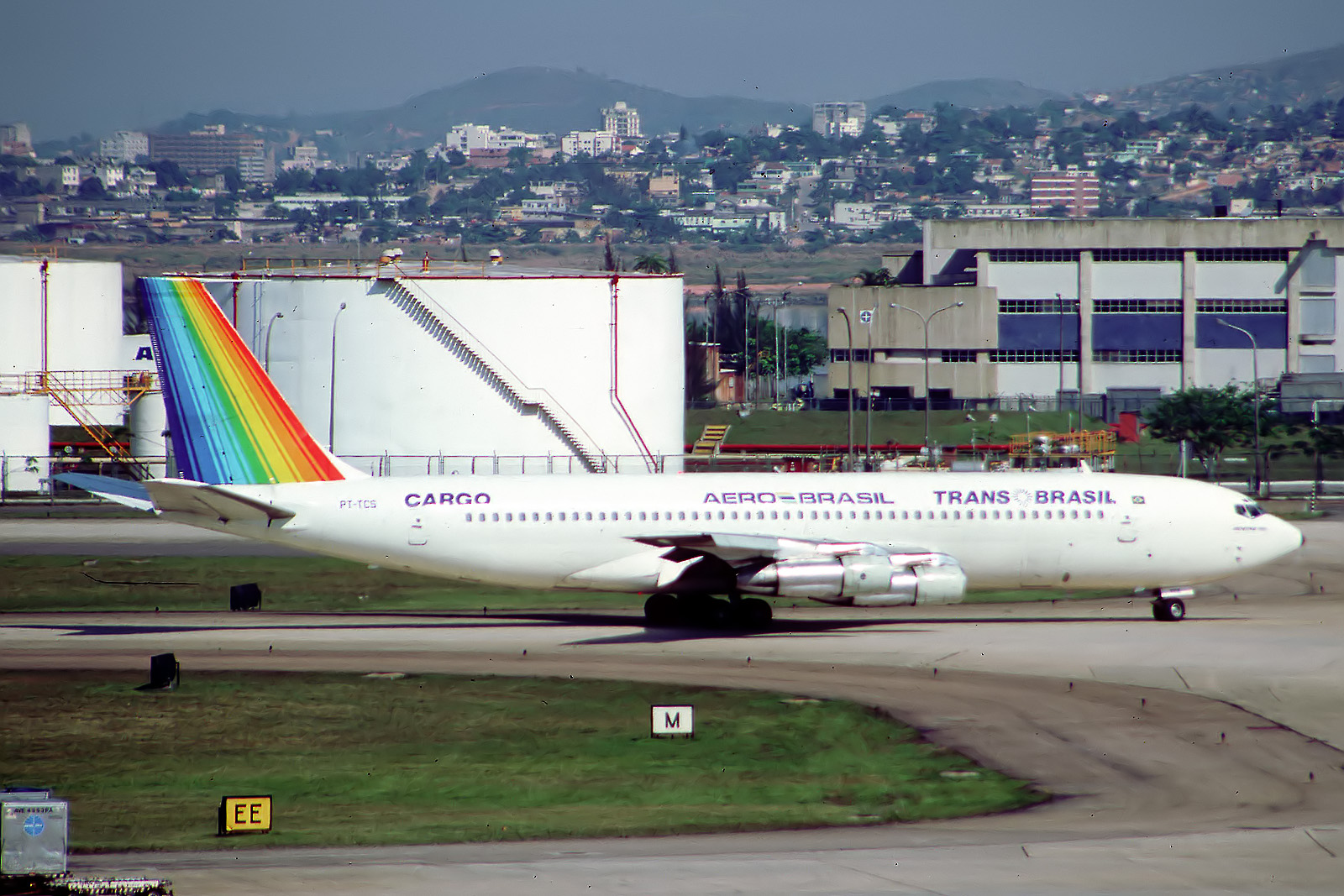
- PT-TCS, the Boeing 707-349C involved in the accident, seen in 1988

Accident
- Date: 21 March 1989
- Summary: Stall caused by pilot error on approach
- Site: Vila Barros, near São Paulo/Guarulhos International Airport, Guarulhos, São Paulo, Brazil
- Total fatalities: 25
- Total injuries: over 200

Aircraft
- Aircraft type: Boeing 707-349C
- Operator: Transbrasil
- IATA flight No.: TR801
- ICAO flight No.: TBA801
- Call sign: TRANSBRASIL 801
- Registration: PT-TCS
- Flight origin: Eduardo Gomes International Airport, Manaus
- Destination: São Paulo/Guarulhos International Airport
- Occupants: 3
- Passengers: 0
- Crew: 3
- Fatalities: 3
- Survivors: 0

Ground casualties
- Ground fatalities: 22
- Ground injuries: at least 200

Transbrasil Flight 801 (TR801/TBA801) was a scheduled cargo flight from Eduardo Gomes International Airport to São Paulo/Guarulhos International Airport that crashed on 21 March 1989. The Boeing 707 crashed into a heavily populated slum in Guarulhos 2 kilometres (1.2 mi; 1.1 nmi) from the runway. The crash resulted in the death of all 3 crew members and 22 people on the ground. 200 people were injured.

== Aircraft ==
The aircraft was a Boeing 707-349C registration PT-TCS with manufacturer serial number 19354 and line number 503. It was powered by 4 Pratt & Whitney JT3D-3B turbofan engines. Its maiden flight was on June 9, 1966, meaning it had been in service for 22 years and 10 months when it crashed. It had accumulated 61,000 flight hours.

The plane had been used in the filming of the 1970 disaster movie Airport. At the time it was owned by Flying Tiger Line. It was subsequently operated by Aer Lingus, EI AI and British Caledonian before being sold to Transbrasil.

== Accident ==
The accident occurred at 11:54 am, Brasilia time. The aircraft was making a high speed approach to runway 09R of São Paulo/Guarulhos International Airport as the runway was set to be closed in 6 minutes' time for runway maintenance. One of the crew members activated the spoilers by mistake. This resulted in the aircraft losing too much airspeed and stalling. The aircraft then crashed into a residential area near Rua Regente Feijó and Rua Sandovalina in the Jardim Scyntila neighborhood approximately 2 kilometres (1.2 mi; 1.1 nmi) from the runway. The aircraft was carrying over 15,000 litres (3,300 imp gal; 4,000 US gal) of jet fuel at the time of impact, which caught fire immediately, resulting in the death of all 3 crew members on board and 22 civilians in the slums along with over 200 injured. The aircraft was loaded with 26 tonnes (26,000 kg; 57,000 lb) of television sets and toys from the Manaus Free Trade Zone, all of which were destroyed. This was the first serious crash since the inauguration of São Paulo/Guarulhos International Airport on 20 January 1985.

== Investigation and aftermath ==
The investigation carried out by the Department of Civil Aviation at the time indicated that the accident was caused by human error. The aircraft had been inspected two months before the accident and was considered "fit" to operate.

== See also ==
- List of accidents and incidents involving commercial aircraft
- List of accidents and incidents involving the Boeing 707
- Transbrasil Flight 303
