= Payam Air =

Iranian cargo airline

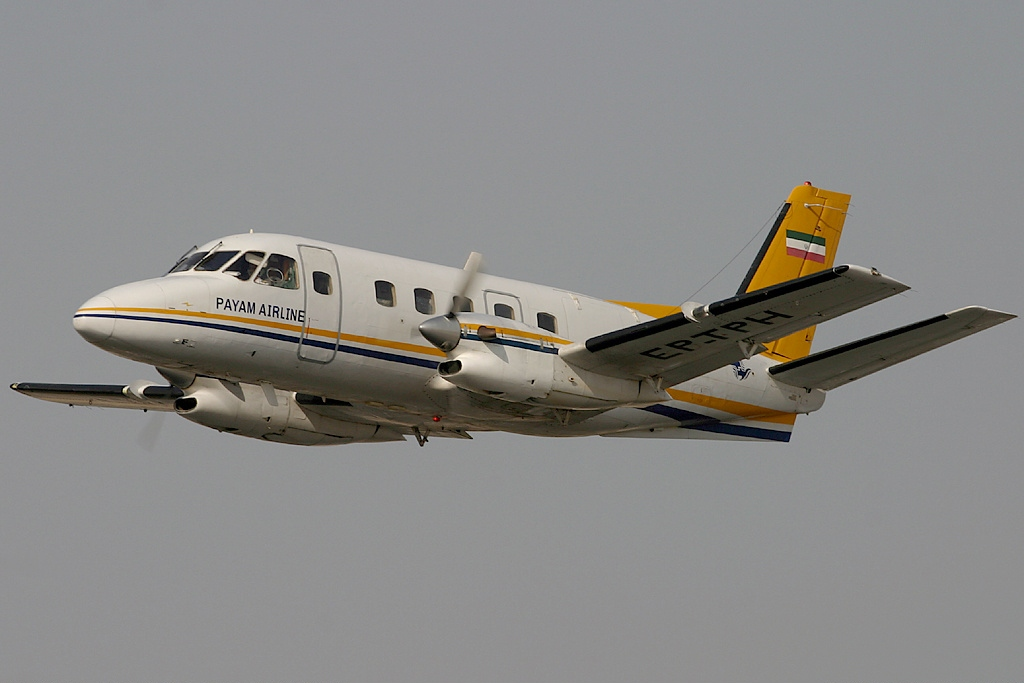
IATA	ICAO	Call sign
2F	IRP	PAYAMAIR
- Founded: 1996; 30 years ago
- Hubs: Mehrabad International Airport
- Fleet size: 5
- Parent company: Ministry of Information and Communications Technology of Iran
- Headquarters: Tehran, Iran
- Website: www.payamaviation.ir

Payam Air (Persian: هواپیمایی پیام, Havâpeymâyi-ye Payâm) is a cargo airline based in Tehran, Iran. It operates cargo services for the Iranian postal, telecom and commercial services. Its main base is Mehrabad International Airport, Tehran. At present 100% of the Payam is owned by the Islamic Republic of Iran Post company and is completely state owned.

== History ==
The airline was established in 1996 and is owned by Iran Telecommunications Company (50%) and Islamic Republic of Iran Post Company (50%). It has 245 employees (at March 2007).

In 2021 Payam Air would be awarded Iran's first air taxi license. At present 100% of the Payam is owned by the Islamic Republic of Iran Post company and is completely state owned.

== Fleet ==
The Payam Air fleet consists of the following aircraft (as of August 2021):

Payam Air Fleet
Aircraft	In Fleet	Notes
Embraer EMB-110P1 Bandeirante	5	4 stored

=== Previously operated ===
At January 2005 the airline also operated:

- 2 Ilyushin Il-76TD

== See also ==
- List of airlines of Iran
