= Payam International Airport =

Iranian airport

Payam International Airport فرودگاه پیام
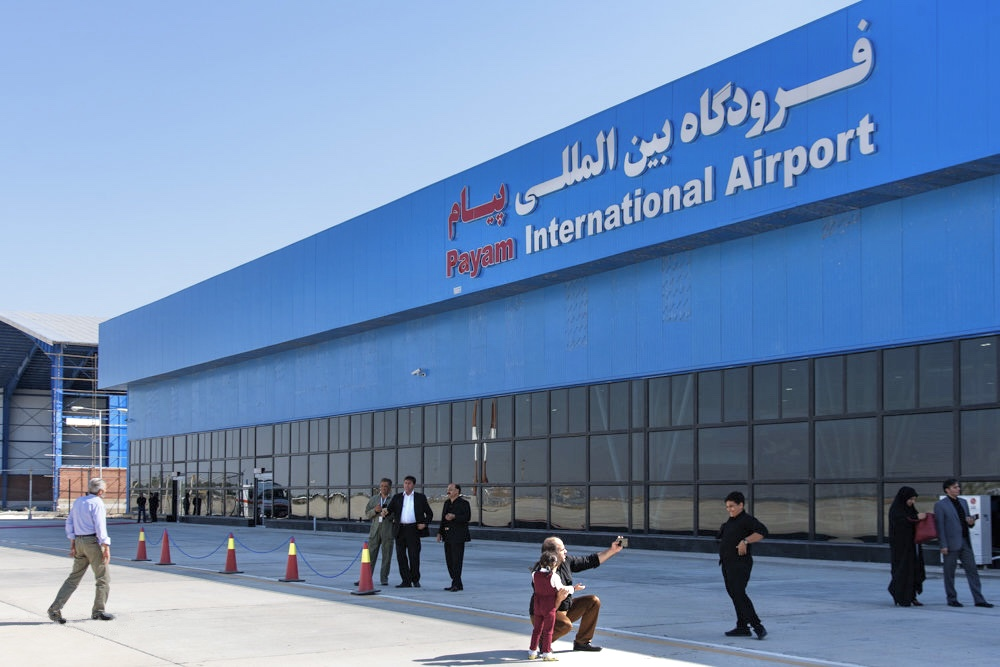
- IATA: PYK; ICAO: OIIP

Summary
- Airport type: Public
- Owner: Ministry of Information and Communications Technology of Iran
- Operator: Payam Aviation Service Co.
- Location: Karaj, Alborz, Iran
- Hub for: Payam Air
- Elevation AMSL: 1,271 m (4,170 ft)
- Coordinates: 35°46′33.9″N 050°49′36.1″E
- Website: Payam Airport

Map
- Location of airport in Iran

Runways
Direction	Length		Surface
Direction	m	ft	Surface
12/30	3,659	12,005	Asphalt
- Sources: GCM, STV, World Aero Data

Payam Airport (Persian: فرودگاه پیام) (IATA: PYK, ICAO: OIIP) is a public, international airport located in Karaj, 40 kilometres (25 mi) from Tehran, in Alborz Province of Iran. The airport was established in 1990, but was not opened officially until 1997. Payam Aviation Services Co. operates the airport as part of Payam Special Economic Zone. Payam Air previously operated an air mail hub at the airport.

The airport has served primarily as cargo field. Commercial passenger services started on 14 September 2018 (23 Sharivar 1397 AP). The first flight was a Taban Air service from Mashhad International Airport.

== Commercial agents ==
- Ashena Courier Co. (ACC)
