= 2019 in aviation =

This is a list of aviation-related events in 2019.

== Orders and deliveries ==
Airbus took 768 net orders in 2019 and delivered 863 aircraft up from 800 in 2018: 642 Airbus A320s (including 551 A320neos), 112 Airbus A350s, 53 Airbus A330s (included 41 A330neos), 48 Airbus A220s and eight Airbus A380s.

== Events ==
=== January ===
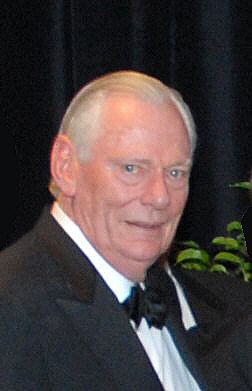
Southwest Airlines founder Herb Kelleher died at 87 on January 3

3 January
Southwest Airlines founder Herb Kelleher dies at 87.
10 January
Air France ends its Joon brand, began in December 2017, and will reintegrate its aircraft and crew.
Boeing delivers the first 767-based KC-46A Pegasus Tanker to the U.S. Air Force.
11 January
UK regional operator Flybe acquisition is proposed for £2.2 million cash by Connect Airways, a joint company of Virgin Atlantic (30%), Stobart Aviation (30%) and fund manager Cyrus Capital (40%).
13 January
Iran Aseman Airlines flies the last passenger Boeing 727 flight in the world. All remaining examples are now freighters.
14 January
A Saha Airlines Boeing 707 crashes at Fath Air Base in Iran, killing all but one of the 16 people on board. It was the last remaining 707 in civil operation.
16 January
Airbus breaks ground for a new A220 final assembly line (FAL) in Mobile, Alabama, a $300 million investment after the $600 million previously committed for the Airbus A320 FAL, to begin deliveries in 2020.
19 January
During a flight from Nantes Atlantique Airport in Nantes, France, to Cardiff Airport in Cardiff, Wales, Argentine professional footballer Emiliano Sala and his pilot die in the crash of their Piper PA-46 Malibu in the English Channel about 7 nautical miles (13 km; 8 mi) northwest of Alderney in the Channel Islands..

=== February ===
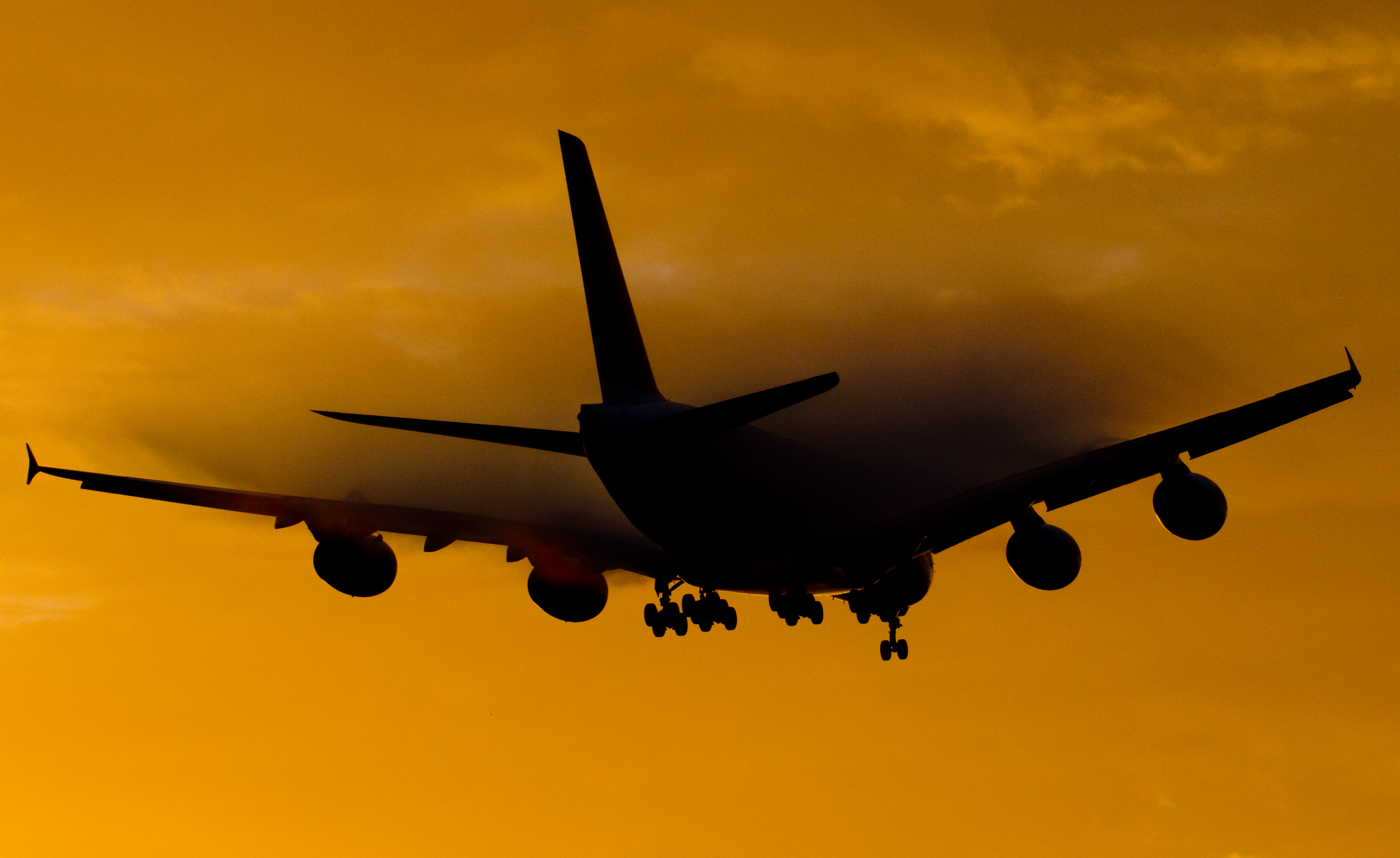
On 14 February, Airbus announced the end of Airbus A380 production in 2021

4 February
Germania Fluggesellschaft, its sister maintenance company Germania Technik Brandenburg and Germania Flugdienste files for insolvency and end flight operations.

6 February
Bombardier Aerospace launches the CRJ550 variant of the CRJ700, with an order for 50 from United Airlines, with 50 seats in three classes to comply with US pilots' scope clauses.

14 February
Airbus announces that it will end production of the A380 in 2021 after Emirates decides to replace its last orders for 39 planes by 30 A350s and 40 A330neos.

16 February
Flybmi, ceases operations and files for administration; Flybmi operated 17 regional jets to 25 European cities, employed 376 employees and carried 522,000 passengers on 29,000 flights in 2018.

19–21 February
The British Royal Air Force stages flypasts of Tornado aircraft to mark their withdrawal from its service.

20–24 February
Aero India is held in Bangalore.

23 February
During approach to Houston's George Bush Intercontinental Airport, a Boeing 767 freighter, Atlas Air Flight 3591, crashes into Trinity Bay in Texas, killing all three people (2 crew members and one passenger) on board.

26 February – 2 March
Avalon Australian International Airshow is held at Avalon Airport.

26 February
The Boeing–Embraer joint venture is approved by Embraer's shareholders.

27 February
VietJet Air purchases 100 Boeing 737 MAX for $12.7 billion at list prices, including 20 MAX 8s and 80 larger MAX 10s, during the 2019 Hanoi Summit.

=== March ===
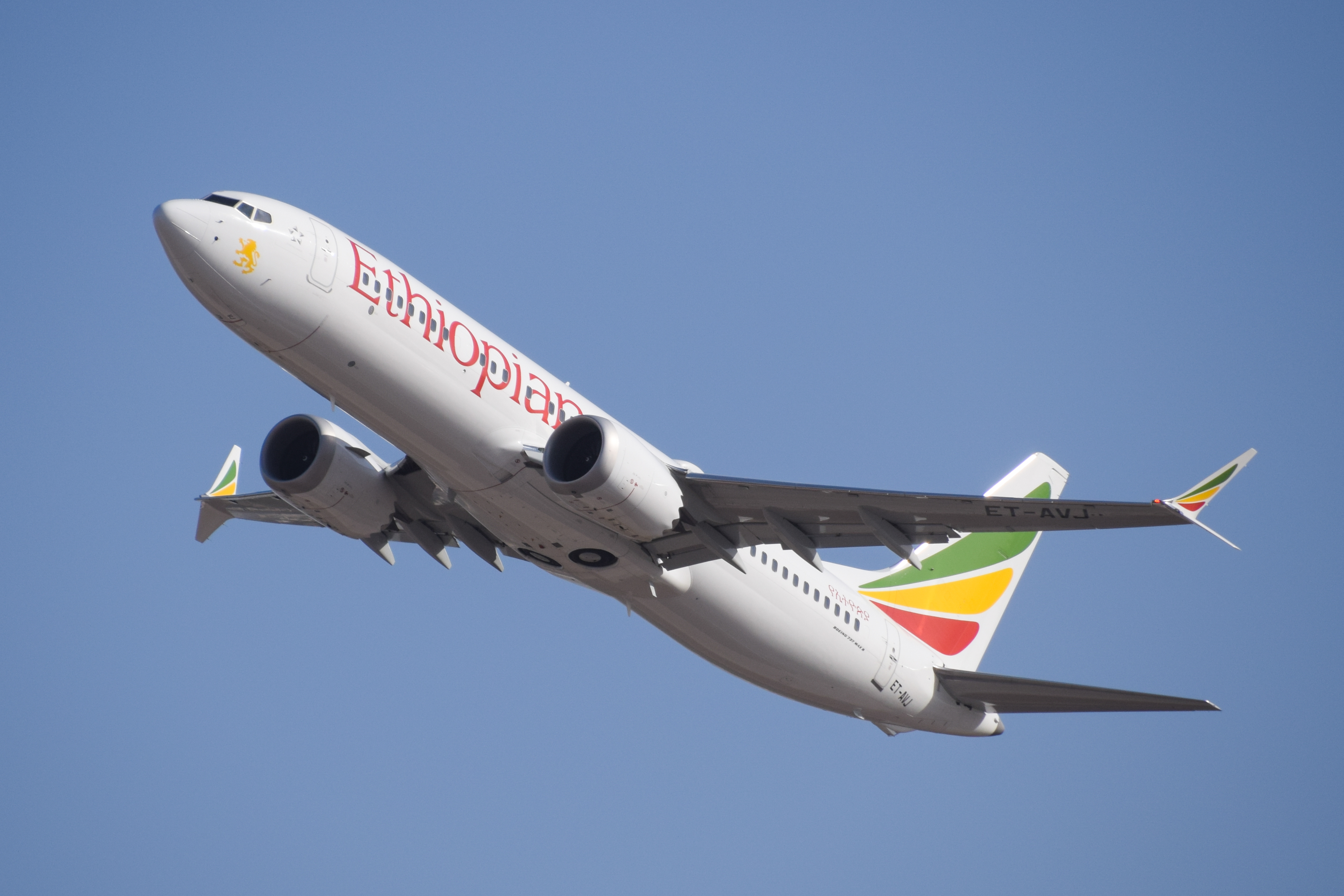
The 10 March Ethiopian Airlines Flight 302 crash led to the Boeing 737 MAX groundings

5 March
The Kratos XQ-58 Valkyrie, a stealthy unmanned combat air vehicle demonstrator for the US Air Force Research Laboratory, makes its first flight at Yuma Proving Ground, Arizona.

10 March
Shortly after taking off from Addis Ababa, Ethiopian Airlines Flight 302, a Boeing 737 MAX 8, crashes near the Ethiopian town of Bishoftu, killing all 157 people on board and becoming the deadliest aviation disaster of 2019.

13 March
The Boeing 737 MAX is grounded worldwide, prompted by similarities between the Lion Air and Ethiopian Airlines crashes.
The Boeing 777-9X prototype is rolled-out in a low-key employees-only event.

21 March
The first flight of the Sikorsky–Boeing SB-1 Defiant high-speed compound helicopter takes place in West Palm Beach, Florida.

25 March
During Chinese leader's Xi Jinping state visit to France, China Aviation Supplies Holding Company commits to 290 Airbus A320 and 10 Airbus A350, worth $34 billion at list prices before discounts, though this general terms agreement does not necessarily correspond to 300 new orders.

27 March
Cathay Pacific takes over LCC rival HK Express for HK$4.93 billion ($628 million), to close by the end of 2019; HK Express operates 23 Airbus A320 on 25 routes from Hong Kong to Japan and Southeast Asia.

28 March
Wow Air ceases operations and cancels all flights. It operated transatlantic services via its hub at Keflavík International Airport.

30 March
The Ilyushin Il-112, the first military transport plane designed in post-Soviet Russia and capable of carrying of up to 5 tonnes, performs its first flight.

=== April ===
2–7 April
Sun 'n Fun is held in Lakeland, Florida, USA.

8 April
Six years after its launch, the five-seat Flaris LAR01 makes its first flight at Zielona Góra Airport in western Poland powered by a single Williams FJ33 turbofan, targeting Polish S-1 experimental aircraft certification by the end of 2019 to start deliveries to local customers and EASA CS-23 certification aimed for the end of 2020.

9 April
The United States Government threatens to place tariffs on European Union products over improper Airbus subsidies.

10 April
Guillaume Faury is appointed Airbus Chief Executive Officer, replacing Tom Enders.

10–13 April
AERO Friedrichshafen is held in Germany.

13 April
After more than a year of ground testing, the Scaled Composites Stratolaunch air-launch carrier completes its maiden flight from Mojave Air and Space Port in California: the largest aircraft by wingspan.

17 April
The Indian carrier Jet Airways suspended operations until further notice.

24 April
United Airlines officially unveiled a new livery.
The Airbus ACJ319neo, which is the corporate jet version of the A319neo, completed its first flight.

=== May ===
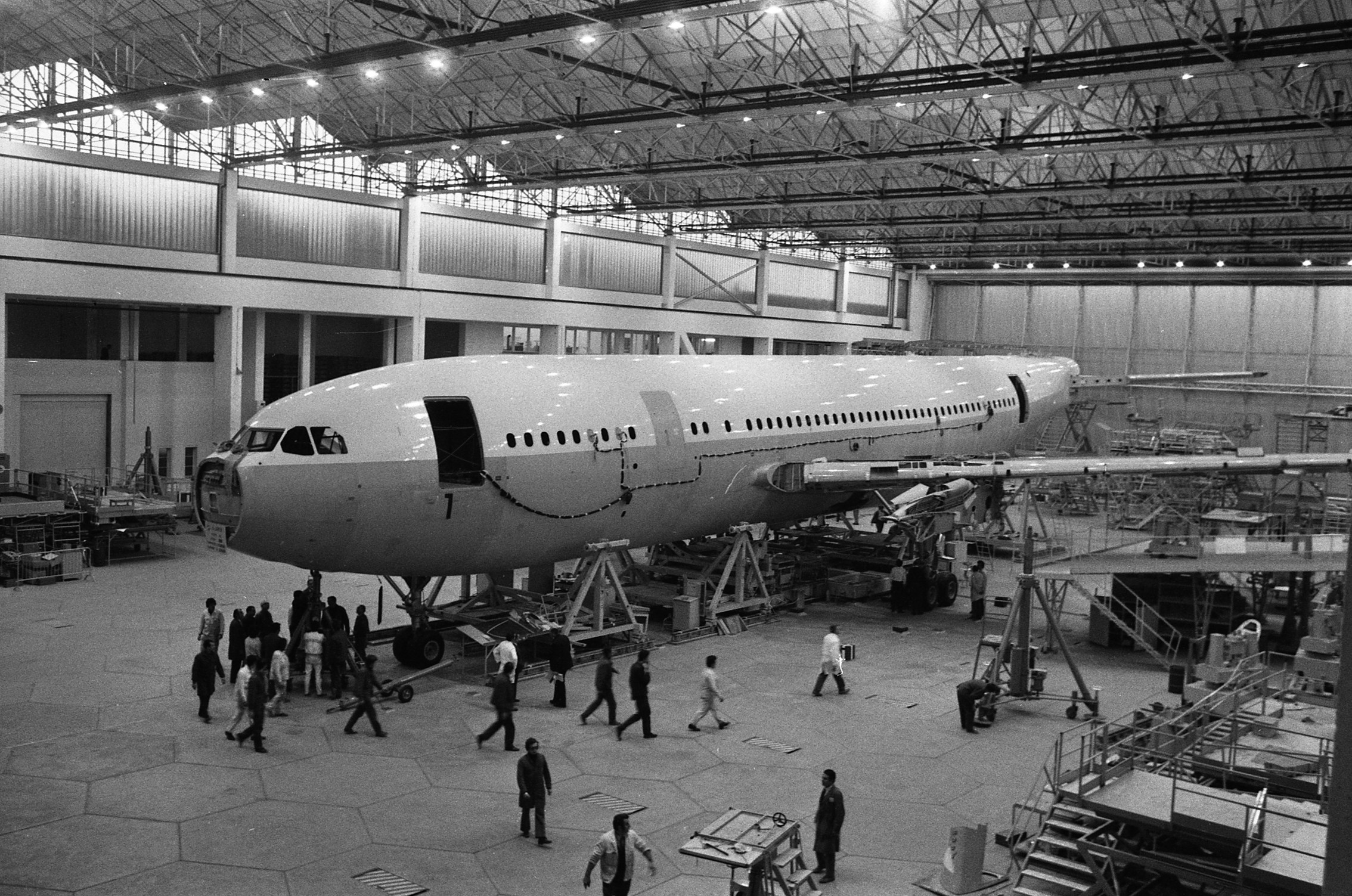
Airbus celebrated on 29 May the 50th anniversary of the partnership launching the A300 (pictured)

May
British forces first deploy Lockheed Martin F-35B Lightning II stealth fighter jets operationally, from RAF Akrotiri on Cyprus in Operation Shader reconnaissance activities.

3 May
The Airbus CityAirbus makes its first flight unmanned.
Miami Air International Flight 293, a Boeing 737-800, overshoots the runway at Jacksonville Naval Air Station with no loss of life.

5 May
Aeroflot Flight 1492, a Sukhoi Superjet 100, bursts into flames while making an emergency landing at Moscow-Sheremetyevo airport; 41 were reported dead out of the 78 occupants.

11 May
Bristow Helicopters parent Bristow Group enters Chapter 11 bankruptcy protection, affecting North America operations, but leaving overseas operations unchanged.

13 May
WestJet receives a C$3.5 billion buyout offer from Onex Corporation, the private equity firm of billionaire Gerry Schwartz.

15 May
Determining that conditions in Venezuela threaten the safety and security of passengers, aircraft, and crew, the United States Department of Homeland Security suspends all commercial passenger and cargo flights between the United States and Venezuela. The United States Department of Transportation simultaneously orders the suspension of all foreign air transportation for passengers or cargo to or from any airport in Venezuela. Flights between the United States and Venezuela will not resume until 30 April 2026.

16 May
Air Canada bids C$520 million ($387.5 million) to buy Canadian tour operator Transat A.T., leisure carrier Air Transat's parent company.

20 May
The 12,000th Airbus, an A220, is delivered to Delta Air Lines.

21–23 May
EBACE is held in Geneva, Switzerland

24 May
Avianca Brazil operations, under bankruptcy protection since December 2018, are suspended by Brazil's civil aviation authority ANAC.

29 May
Airbus celebrates the 50th anniversary of its original partnership agreement launching the A300, with a flypast over Toulouse of its aircraft including the A220, A320, A330neo, A350 XWB, A380 and BelugaXL, along with the Patrouille de France.

=== June ===
3 June
Longview Aviation Capital establishes De Havilland Canada to take over the Dash 8 programme from Bombardier Aerospace, reuniting all DHC aircraft under their historic name.
An Antonov An-32 belonging to the Indian Air Force crashes in Arunachal Pradesh, India, killing all 13 occupants. The wreckage of the aircraft was found on 11 June.

9 June
United Technologies and Raytheon announce their proposed merge to form a $74 billion per year aerospace and defense company, providing aircraft engines, parts, avionics, interiors, missiles and technology; the deal could close in the first half of 2020.

13 June
Mitsubishi Aircraft re-brands its Mitsubishi Regional Jet (MRJ) as the SpaceJet: the MRJ90 becomes the SpaceJet M90; the SpaceJet M100 is a 1.3 m (4 ft 3 in) shorter derivative seating 76 to meet US scope clauses, 1.1 m (3 ft 7 in) longer than the cancelled MRJ70.

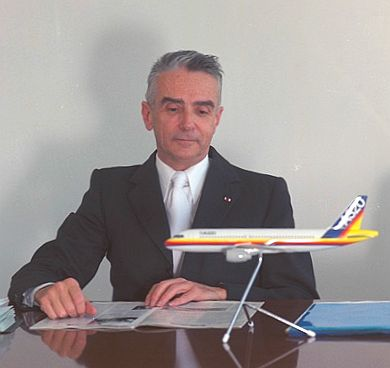
On 14 June, Roger Béteille, one of the founders of Airbus, dies at 97

Daher, the manufacturer of the SOCATA TBM high-speed single turboprop, is to buy US Quest Aircraft, builder of the Quest Kodiak utility single turboprop, from Japanese Setouchi Holdings, its owner since 2015: the acquisition should close by the end of the year.

14 June
Roger Béteille, one of the founders of Airbus and initiators of the A300 project, alongside Henri Ziegler and Felix Kracht, dies at 97.

17 June
Paris Air Show opens in Le Bourget, France.
The Airbus A321XLR is launched at the Paris Air Show, with deliveries expected from 2023. It will offer 4,700 nmi (8,700 km) of range and feature a new permanent Rear Centre Tank (RCT) for more fuel, a strengthened landing gear for a 101 t (223,000 lb) MTOW, and an optimised wing trailing-edge flap to preserve take-off performance.

18 June
Partners on the E-Fan X demonstrator, Rolls-Royce plc announces its acquisition of Siemens' electric propulsion branch, to be completed in late 2019, employing 180 in Germany and Hungary.

19 June
At the Paris Air Show, International Airlines Group signs a letter of intent for 200 Boeing 737 MAX 8 and 10, valued at more than $24 billion at list prices, expressing its confidence and expecting a successful return to service after the Boeing 737 MAX groundings; IAG operates almost exclusively Airbus A320 family narrowbodies, and wants to spur competition in its fleet by operating the MAX at least in its low-cost affiliates Vueling and Level, being also the parent company of Aer Lingus, British Airways and Iberia.
The Dutch Public Prosecution Service names four suspects in the downing of Malaysia Airlines Flight 17: Igor Girkin, Sergey Dubinsky, Oleg Pulatov and Leonid Kharchenko.

23 June
The Paris Air Show ends with 866 aircraft commitments totalling $60.9 billion (130 firm orders, 562 LoI/MoU, 119 options and 55 options on LoIs): 388 for Airbus including 243 A321XLRs and 85 A220s, 232 for Boeing including 200 737 MAXes for IAG, 145 for ATR and 78 for Embraer; 558 narrowbodies, 62 widebodies, 93 regional jets and 153 turboprops.

25 June
Bombardier Aviation sells its remaining airliner programme, the CRJ series, to Mitsubishi Heavy Industries, in a deal expected to close in the first half of 2020 subject to regulatory approval, and refocuses on its business jet programmes.

28 June
Gulfstream announced its G600 type and production certificates from the FAA, before first deliveries later in the year.

=== July ===
11 July
At 73, Norwegian Air Shuttle chief executive Bjørn Kjos steps down from his role after 17 years, having transformed the operator from a small regional airline to a pan-European budget carrier and launched transatlantic low-cost long-haul flights.

17 July
Textron suspends the Cessna Citation Hemisphere business jet development as its Safran Silvercrest turbofans did not meet objectives.

22–28 July
EAA AirVenture Oshkosh is held in Wisconsin, USA.

=== August ===
9 August
Abbotsford International Airshow is held August 9–13, Vancouver, British Columbia, Canada
15 August
Ural Airlines Flight 178 lost power to both engines after a bird strike shortly after take-off from Moscow–Zhukovsky. The Airbus A321 made an emergency landing in a corn field; all 233 people on board survived, drawing comparisons with US Airways Flight 1549.

=== September ===
2 September
French carrier Aigle Azur files for bankruptcy and is placed in receivership. All flights cease on 6 September; the airline's 9,800 annual slots at Paris–Orly attract numerous takeover bids.

11 September
A successor to the Helios Prototype developed by AeroVironment for its HAPSMobile joint venture with Softbank, the Hawk30 High Altitude Pseudo Satellite makes its first flight from the NASA Armstrong Flight Research Center in California.

12 September
Embraer delivers its first E195-E2 to Azul Brazilian Airlines through lessor AerCap, configured with 136 seats in a single class.

13 September
Airbus delivers the 9,000th A320-family aircraft to Easyjet. Airbus continues to increase production rates and expects to reach the 10,000 milestone early in 2021.

19 September
XL Airways France is placed under legal receivership due to financial difficulties, ticket sales ceased immediately, and flights are suspended from 23 September.

23 September
The Thomas Cook Group, including Thomas Cook Group Airlines, is placed in compulsory liquidation. All flights ceased with immediate effect, triggering the UK's largest peacetime repatriation operation for 150,000 stranded passengers.
Textron Aviation announces the FAA Type Certification for its Cessna Citation Longitude, after 6,000 flight hours, 11,000 test points and a 31,000 nmi (57,000 km) world tour.

24 September
Bombardier announces the Transport Canada Type Certification of the Global 5500 and 6500, before entry-into-service later in 2019 and FAA/EASA approval.

30 September
Adria Airways files for bankruptcy and ceases all operations, after temporarily suspending most flights the previous week.

=== October ===
2 October
Peruvian Airlines suspends all operations due to the Peruvian Customs Tax Court seizing their bank accounts after failing to pay fuel costs.
A Boeing B-17 Flying Fortress operated by the Collings Foundation on a fundraising flight crashes at Bradley International Airport, killing seven aboard the aircraft and injuring seven others. In March 2020, the FAA revoked the foundation's permission to carry passengers on fundraising flights, citing serious safety deficiencies discovered during the investigation into the crash.

4 October
Ukraine Air Alliance Flight 4050, an Antonov An-12 operating a cargo flight from Vigo, crashes on approach to Lviv Airport, Ukraine killing 5 of the 8 people on board.

9 October
ATR launches the STOL variant of its ATR 42, the -600S, capable of operating from 800 m (2,600 ft) runways with up to 42 passengers, with certification expected for the second half of 2022 before first delivery.

19 October
Alaska Airlines Flight 3296, operated by regional carrier PenAir, crash landed at Unalaska Airport killing 1 and injuring 2.

19–20 October
Qantas flies an experimental non-stop New York–Sydney service using a Boeing 787-9 Dreamliner with 49 people on board, covering 16,200 km (8,700 nmi) in 19 hrs 16 min, as part of its Project Sunrise preparations for regular non-stop flights from London and New York to Sydney from 2022 or 2023.

21 October
Gulfstream announces its G700 flagship, powered by Rolls-Royce Pearl 700s, to be delivered from 2022. The $75 million jet is a 10 ft (3.0 m) stretch of the G650, and should make its first flight in the first half of 2020.

22–24 October
NBAA Business Aviation Convention & Exhibition (NBAA-BACE) is held in Las Vegas, Nevada, USA.

29 October
IndiGo orders 300 Airbus A320neos, including the A320neo, A321neo and the recently launched A321XLR, taking IndiGo's total A320neo-family orders to 730. Indigo is already the largest A320neo operator with 97 aircraft, alongside 128 A320ceos.

=== November ===
4 November
Iberia and Vueling parent IAG acquires Spanish operator Air Europa from Globalia for €1 billion ($1.1 billion). Air Europa operates 66 aircraft and recorded €100 million operating profit in 2018. The deal is expected to be completed in the first half of 2020.

7 November
The single turboprop Epic E1000 obtains its FAA type certification.

13 November
After more than 200 flight tests over 700 hours, the Airbus BelugaXL receives its EASA type certification, before entering service by early 2020.

18 November
Boeing (49%) and Embraer (51%) announce a joint venture to market the C-390 Millennium tactical transport aircraft, called Boeing Embraer – Defense, to operate after the regulatory approvals and closing conditions.

=== December ===
9 December
Delta Air Lines announced it took a stake in Wheels Up, a US air charter operator founded in 2013 and operating 120 aircraft (King Air 350i twin turboprops, Citation Excels/XLSs, Citation Xs and Hawker 400XP business jets) for its 7,700 members, to become its largest investor and merge it in the first quarter of 2020 with its Delta Private Jets subsidiary, itself operating 70 business jets.

12 December
The shortest Embraer E-Jet E2 family variant, the E175-E2, makes its first takeoff from São José dos Campos, starting a 24-month test campaign that will include two further aircraft.

16 December
Boeing announces the suspension of 737 MAX production from January, so that delivery of the 400 aircraft in storage can be prioritized when the grounding is lifted.

27 December
A Fokker 100 operating Bek Air Flight 2100 crashes on take-off from Almaty, Kazakhstan. There were 13 fatalities and 66 injured among the 93 passengers and 5 crew.

== First flights ==
- 5 March – Kratos XQ-58 Valkyrie 58-001
- 21 March – Sikorsky–Boeing SB-1 Defiant N100FV
- 30 March – Ilyushin Il-112 41400
- 5 April – Flaris LAR01 SP-YLE
- 3 May – Airbus CityAirbus D-HCIA
- 11 September – HAPSMobile Hawk30
- 12 December - Embraer E-Jet E175-E2 PR-ZXM

== Retirements ==
January - Boeing 707: following the crash of the last remaining aircraft in operational service. The converted KC-707 is still in service with Omega Aerial Refueling Services.

== Deadliest crash ==
The deadliest crash of this year was Ethiopian Airlines Flight 302, a Boeing 737 MAX which crashed shortly after takeoff from Addis Ababa on 10 March, killing all 157 people on board. This accident resulted in the worldwide grounding of the 737 MAX series. The deadliest military crash occurred when a Chilean Air Force C-130 crashed into the Drake Passage on 9 December, killing all 38 people on board.
