= Anduki =

Anduki is a location in Brunei.

- For the location in the Belait District, including the Jubilee Recreation Park, see Seria
- For the heliport and airfield, see Anduki Airfield
