= Miami Air International =

American charter airline

IATA	ICAO	Call sign
LL	BSK	BISCAYNE
- Founded: August 1990; 35 years ago
- Ceased operations: May 6, 2020; 5 years ago
- AOC #: MYWA994S
- Hubs: Miami International Airport
- Fleet size: 6
- Headquarters: Miami-Dade County, Florida, U.S.
- Key people: Tomas Romero
- Website: miamiair.com

Miami Air International was an American charter airline based in Miami-Dade County, Florida, United States. It operated worldwide passenger charter flights for diverse groups including cruise operators, professional sports teams and the United States military. It was based at Miami International Airport. Miami Air's customers included incentive groups, sports teams, Fortune 500 companies, major cruise lines, entertainers, political candidates and the United States government. Under the Civil Reserve Air Fleet (CRAF) program, Miami Air was contracted by the United States Air Force Air Mobility Command (USAF AMC) for transporting troops and cargo.

== History ==
The airline was established in August 1990 and started operations in October 1991 using Boeing 727-200 aircraft on lease from Xerox Credit Corporation.

George Lyall who had a long career at Eastern Air Lines and Pan Am World Airways was chairman and Ross Fischer who had run System Operations at People Express and Eastern was president. These executives were the primary shareholders and founders, which also included a variety of former Eastern personnel, a former "Big 8" partner with extensive industry audit experience, an upcoming Miami lawyer and several former People Express operations personnel. By 2000, the company had grown to 8 owned Boeing 727 aircraft and revenues in excess of $100 million.

That year, a consortium led by Eagle Global Logistics purchased a majority stake in the company, primarily from retiring shareholders and embarked on converting the company's Boeing 727s to cargo aircraft to operate its cargo hub in Austin, Texas, under the Quest International name. Simultaneously, new Boeing 737-800s were leased to provide the passenger service of the converted Boeing 727s. In 2001, the events of September 11th and the awarding of the postal contract to FedEx Express caused lease rates and values of Boeing 727s to plummet and in early 2002 EGL stopped utilizing Quest cargo aircraft and they were sold off.

Meanwhile, in large part due to the huge jump in the military business, Miami Air's passenger business thrived and the company grew to 8 Boeing 737-800s and 2 passenger Boeing 727s by 2005. At that time one of the existing shareholders (TSI Holding Company) expressed a desire to purchase the entire company and bought out the other EGL consortium and remaining original shareholders.

For some time, Miami Air International with its Boeing 737-800s remained an ad hoc charterer with a wide customer base. The military, sports teams, cruise lines, tour operators and incentive groups were the main customers. Its operations were worldwide covering every continent except Antarctica. The Miami Dolphins and Pittsburgh Steelers secured charter services for the 2017 season.

Miami Air International was wholly owned by TSI Holdings and had 405 employees (at March 2007). The airline's IATA code was changed from GL to LL due to Air Greenland's use of the same code; Air Greenland was the first one to use the code.

On March 24, 2020, Miami Air International filed for Chapter 11 Bankruptcy protection and ceased operations on May 8, 2020. All leased aircraft from TUI fly Belgium were returned to Brussels. On May 11, Miami Air International converted its Chapter 11 case into a Chapter 7 bankruptcy liquidation.

Tomas Romero, the owner of World Atlantic Airlines, acquired Miami Air International including all of its certificates and trademarks in late May for US$3.3 million, during a bankruptcy auction.

A "new" Miami Air would operate with the same aircraft type and employ the same key personnel as the bankrupt firm, as well as some new experienced employees.

== Fleet ==
=== Final fleet ===
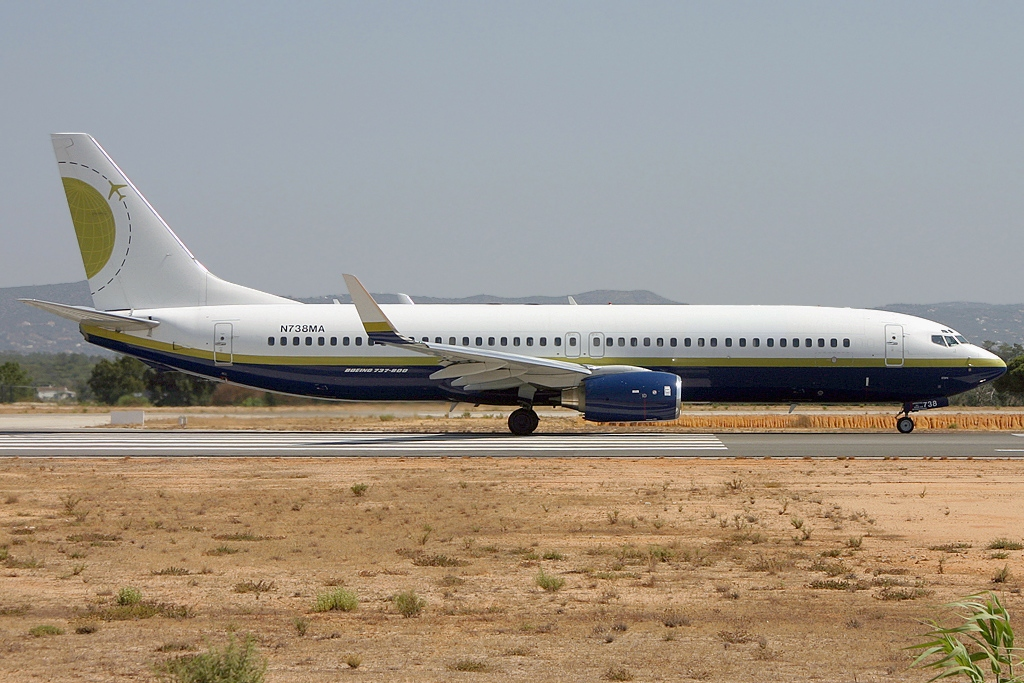
Miami Air International Boeing 737-800

At the time of closure, the Miami Air International fleet consisted of the following aircraft:

Miami Air International fleet
Aircraft	In service	Orders	Passengers			Notes
Aircraft	In service	Orders	B	Y	Total	Notes
Boeing 737-800	6	—	—	168	168	
Boeing 737-800	6	—	48	70	118	
Total	6	—				

=== Retired fleet ===
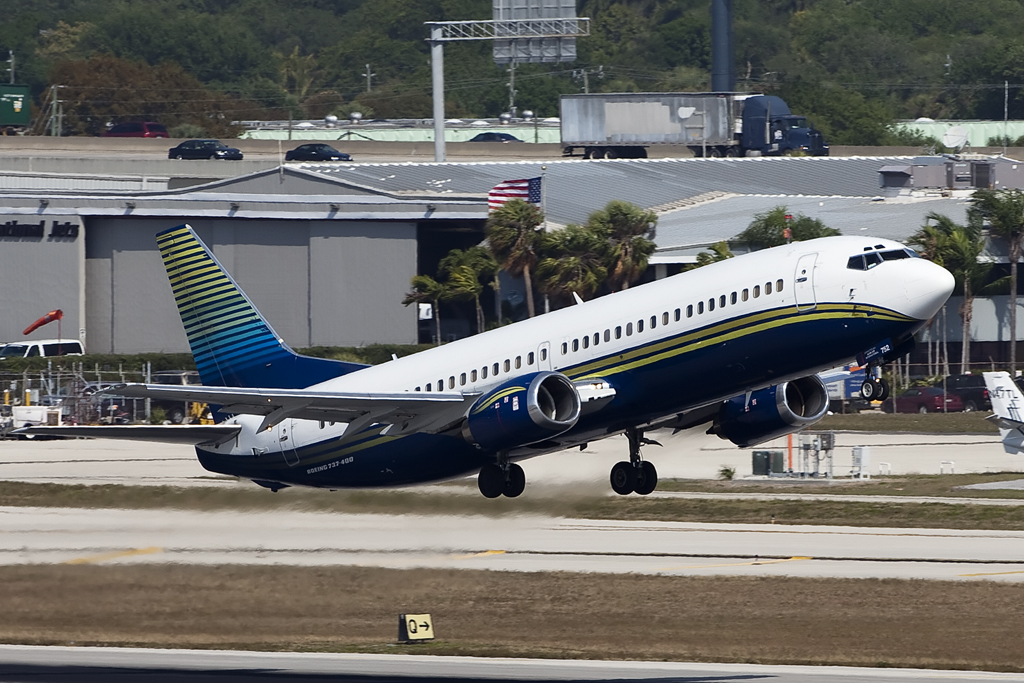
A former Miami Air International Boeing 737-400 taking off at Fort Lauderdale–Hollywood International Airport in 2011

Miami Air International had used the following aircraft models in the past:

Miami Air International retired fleet
Aircraft	Total	Introduced	Retired	Notes
Boeing 727-200	10	1991	2005	
Boeing 737-400	2	2006	2017	
Boeing 767-200	1	2011	2012	Leased from Dynamic Airways
McDonnell Douglas MD-87	2	2000	2002	Transferred to Allegiant Air

== Accidents and incidents ==
- On May 3, 2019, Miami Air International Flight 293, a charter flight that originated from Guantanamo Bay Naval Base, Cuba, slid into the St. Johns River with 143 occupants on board after landing at Naval Air Station Jacksonville in Jacksonville, Florida, in the middle of a storm. All on board survived, and there were 21 injuries reported.

== See also ==
- List of defunct airlines of the United States
