= Lion Air Flight 904 =

2013 aviation accident in Indonesia

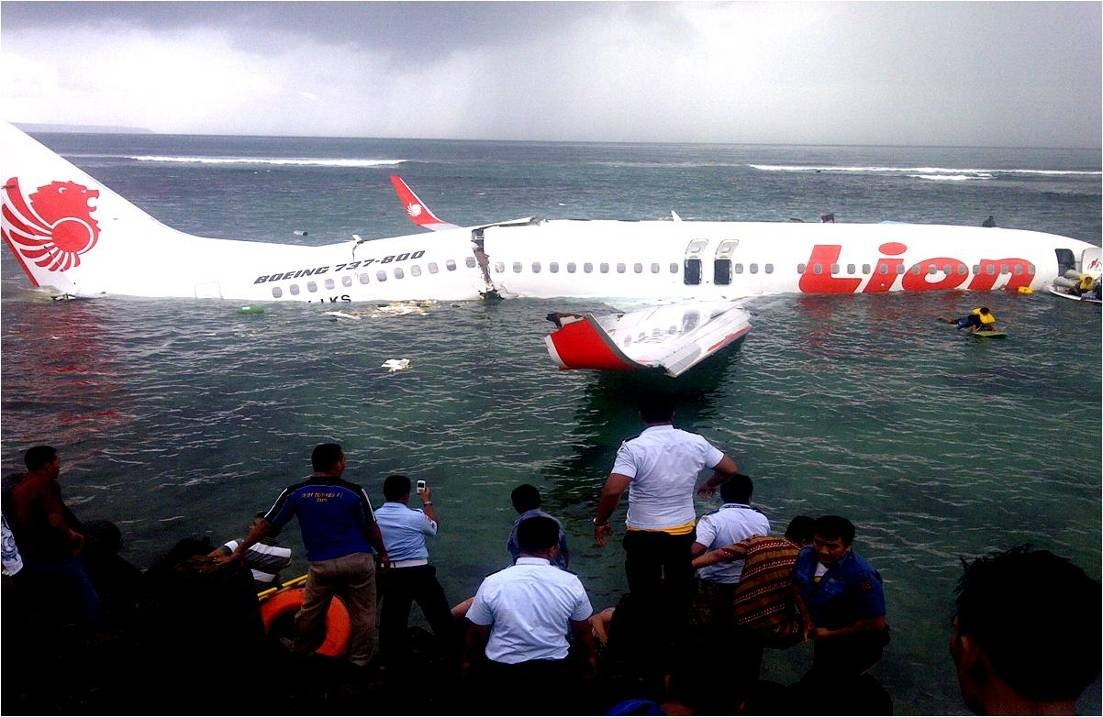
- The aircraft as it came to rest in the shallow waters

Accident
- Date: 13 April 2013
- Summary: Crashed into the sea on approach; controlled flight into water; failed go-around attempt
- Site: Off Ngurah Rai International Airport, Denpasar, Bali, Indonesia; 8°44′57″S 115°8′29″E

Aircraft
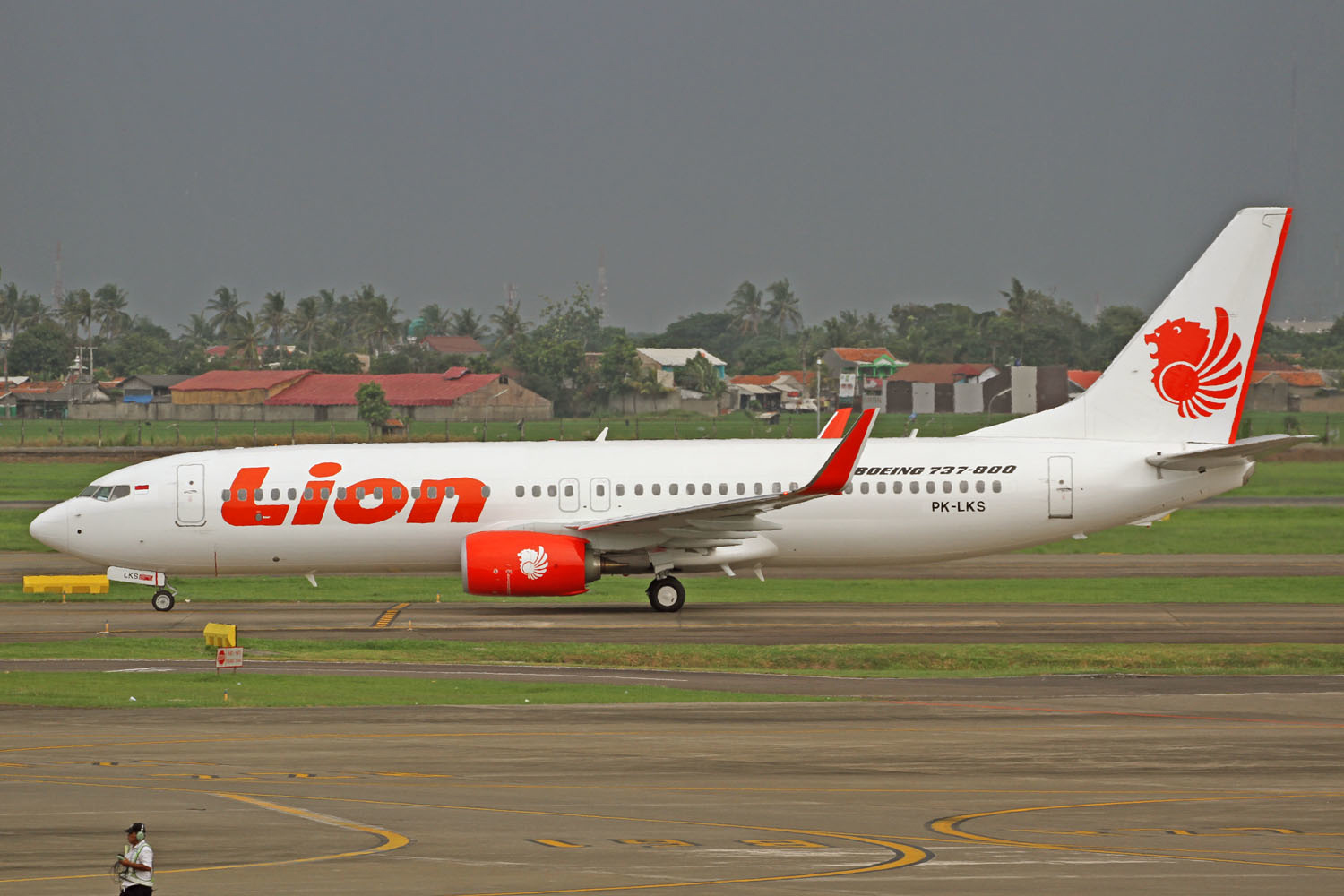
- PK-LKS, the aircraft involved, seen 9 days before the accident
- Aircraft type: Boeing 737-8GP
- Operator: Lion Air
- IATA flight No.: JT904
- ICAO flight No.: LNI904
- Call sign: LION INTER 904
- Registration: PK-LKS
- Flight origin: Husein Sastranegara International Airport, Bandung, Indonesia
- Destination: Ngurah Rai International Airport, Denpasar, Indonesia
- Occupants: 108
- Passengers: 101
- Crew: 7
- Fatalities: 0
- Injuries: 46
- Survivors: 108

Lion Air Flight 904 was a scheduled domestic passenger flight from Husein Sastranegara International Airport in Bandung to Ngurah Rai International Airport in Bali, Indonesia. On 13 April 2013, the Boeing 737-800 operating the flight crashed into water short of the runway while on final approach to land. All 101 passengers and 7 crew on board survived the accident. At 3:10 p.m., the aircraft crashed approximately 1.1 kilometres (0.6 nmi) short of the seawall protecting the threshold of Runway 09. The aircraft's fuselage broke into two and 46 people were injured, 4 of them seriously.

Among the findings contained in the final investigation report was that the crew continued the approach in adverse weather conditions beyond the point at which the approved procedure would have required to abort the landing. The subsequent attempt to go around was made too late to avoid the impact with the sea. There were no issues with the aircraft and all systems were operating normally.

== Background ==
=== Aircraft ===
The aircraft involved was a 53-day-old Boeing 737-8GP with serial number 38728 and registered as PK-LKS. It had logged about 142 hours and 37 minutes of flight time in 104 takeoff and landing cycles. It was manufactured by Boeing Commercial Airplanes on 19 February 2013 and was powered by two CFM International CFM56-7B24E engines.

=== Crew and passengers ===
The captain was 48-year-old Mahlup Gozali, an Indonesian national who joined Lion Air on 3 February 2003 and had logged 15,000 hours of flight experience, including 6,173 hours and 53 minutes on the Boeing 737. His co-pilot was 24-year-old Chirag Kalra, an Indian national who had 1,200 flight hours, 923 of which were on the Boeing 737. He joined Lion Air on 25 April 2011.

Nationality	Passengers	Crew	Total
Indonesia	97	6	103
France	1	—	1
Belgium	1	—	1
Singapore	2	—	2
India	—	1	1
Total	101	7	108

There were 2 pilots and 5 flight attendants with 101 passengers on board consisting of 95 adults, 5 children and 1 infant. 97 passengers were Indonesians, 1 French, 1 Belgian, and 2 Singaporeans. 6 of the crew were Indonesian while one came from India.

== Investigation ==
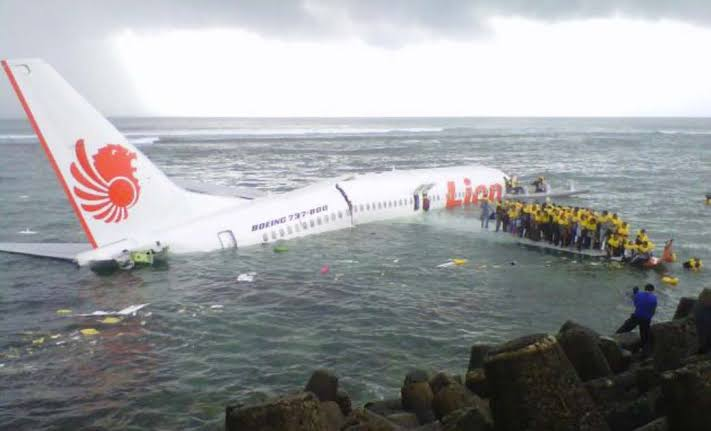
Another view of the aftermath of PK-LKS

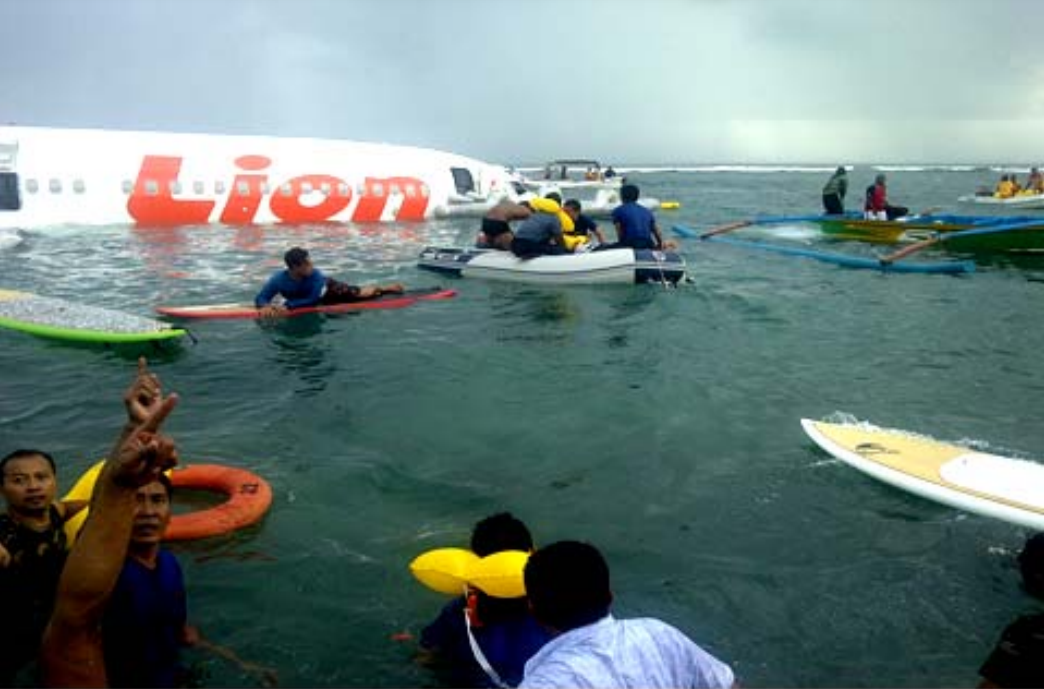
Another view of the aftermath of Flight 904

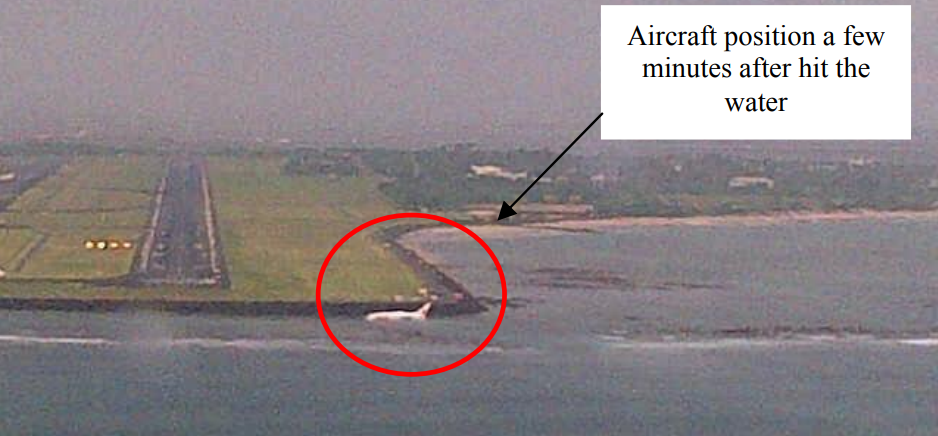
A view of the accident aircraft and the runway it was designated to land on

The Indonesian National Transportation Safety Committee (NTSC) published a preliminary report on 15 May 2013. Flight data showed that the aircraft continued to descend below the minimum descent altitude (MDA), which is 142 metres (466 ft) above ground level (AGL). The report found that at 270 metres (890 ft) AGL, the first officer reported that the runway was not in sight. At approximately 46 metres (151 ft) AGL, the pilot again stated he could not see the runway. Flight data showed that the pilots attempted to perform a go-around at approximately 6.1 metres (20 ft) AGL, but contacted the water surface moments later. The captain's go around decision came far too late. The bare minimum altitude for a 737 go around is 15 metres (49 ft), as 9.1 metres (30 ft) of altitude is lost when executing the manoeuvre. There has been no indication that the aircraft suffered any mechanical malfunction. The final report was published in 2014.

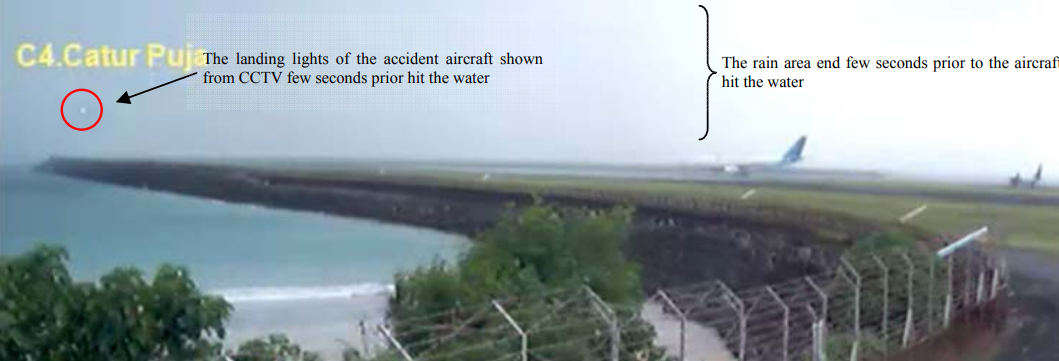
Flight 904 moments before ditching into the waters below

In January 2017, Budi Waseso, the chief of Indonesia's national narcotics agency, alleged that the pilot of Lion Air Flight 904 was under the influence of drugs at the time of the accident, and had hallucinated that the sea was part of the runway. That claim directly contradicted the statement made after the accident by Indonesia's transport ministry, which said the pilots had not tested positive for drugs.

The NTSC concluded that the flight path became unstable below minimum descent altitude with the rate of descent exceeding 300 metres per minute (1,000 ft/min). Analysis of the pitch angle versus engine power based on the flight data recorder,

indicated that the basic principle of jet aircraft flying was not adhered during manual flying.

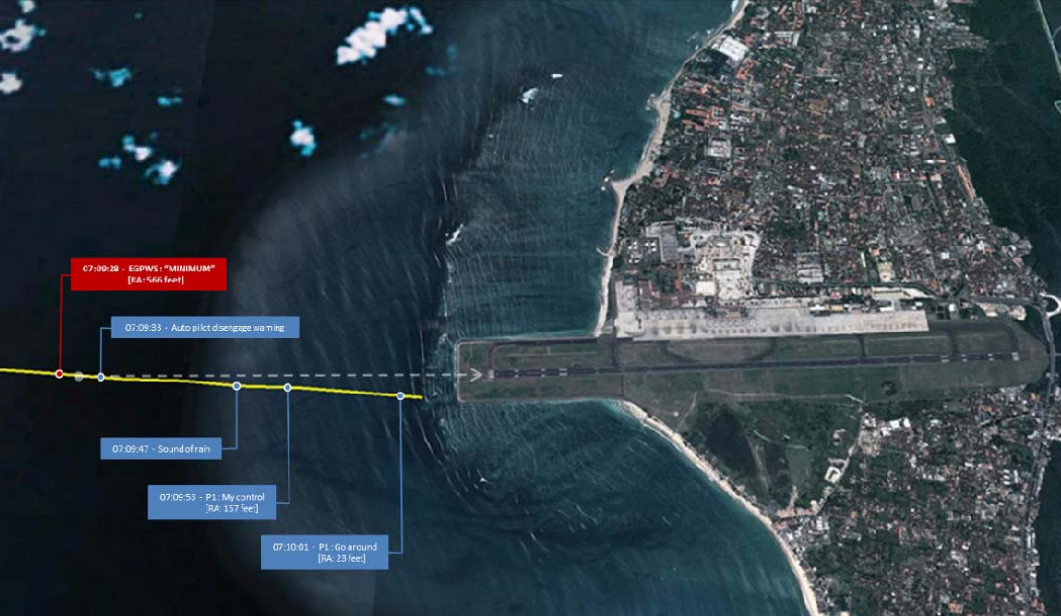
The flight path of Flight 904 on its approach to land

The flight crew lost situational awareness and visual references as the aircraft entered a rain cloud during the final approach below minimum descent altitude. The Captain's go-around decision and execution was conducted at an altitude which was insufficient for it to be executed successfully. The pilots were not provided with timely and accurate weather information considering the weather around the airport and particularly on final approach was changing rapidly.

== See also ==
- Air Niugini Flight 73 – A Boeing 737 that crashed in similar circumstances in 2018
- Japan Air Lines Flight 2 – A DC-8 that crashed in San Francisco Bay in 1968
- Miami Air International Flight 293 – A Boeing 737 that crashed in a storm in 2019
