= Anduki Airfield =

Domestic airport and heliport in Seria, Brunei Darussalam

Anduki Airfield Lapangan Terbang Anduki
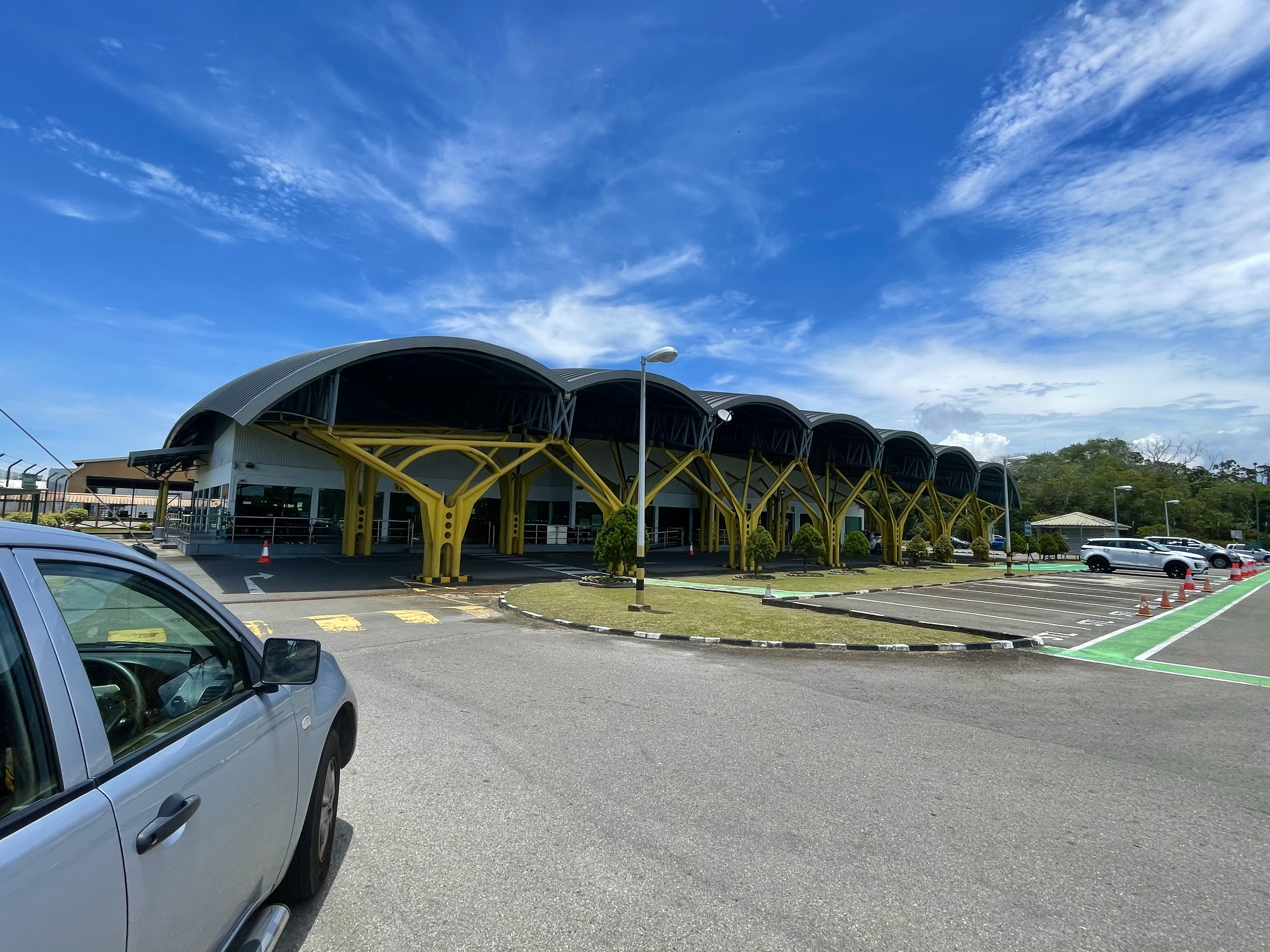
- Anduki Airfield arrival and departure building
- IATA: KUB; ICAO: WBAK

Summary
- Airport type: Public heliport
- Owner: Government of Brunei
- Operator: Brunei Shell Petroleum
- Serves: Brunei Darussalam
- Location: Seria, Belait District, Brunei Darussalam
- Opened: 1951; 75 years ago
- Built: 1949; 77 years ago
- Time zone: Brunei Darussalam Time (BNT) (UTC+08:00)
- Elevation AMSL: 2.13 m (7.0 ft)
- Coordinates: 04°37′56″N 114°22′37″E
- Website: www.civil-aviation.gov.bn

Maps
- 4°37′58″N 114°22′38″E
- Location in the Belait District of Brunei Darussalam

Runways
Direction	Length		Surface
Direction	m	ft	Surface
05H/23H	820	2,690	asphalt

Helipads
Number	Length		Surface
Number	m	ft	Surface
1			asphalt
2			asphalt
3			asphalt/concrete
4			asphalt/concrete
5			asphalt
6			asphalt
- Sources: ICAO code, location, elevation, name, operator, coordinates

Anduki Airfield (Malay: Lapangan Terbang Anduki; abbrev: AKI) (IATA: KUB, ICAO: WBAK) is a domestic airfield which now primarily operates as a heliport, located in Seria, a town in the Belait District of Brunei Darussalam. Although Anduki Airfield is owned by the Government of Brunei, it is operated and managed by Brunei Shell Petroleum (BSP), who currently fly Sikorsky S-92 and AgustaWestland AW139 helicopters in support of servicing offshore oil platforms. BSP replaced the original grass airstrip with a sealed instrument runway in 2008. Future upgrades include the addition of runway lighting, and an enhanced instrument approach procedure. Operations at Anduki Airfield are carried out in accordance with regulations from the United Kingdom Civil Aviation Authority (CAA) and the European Union Aviation Safety Agency (EASA) standards.

== History ==
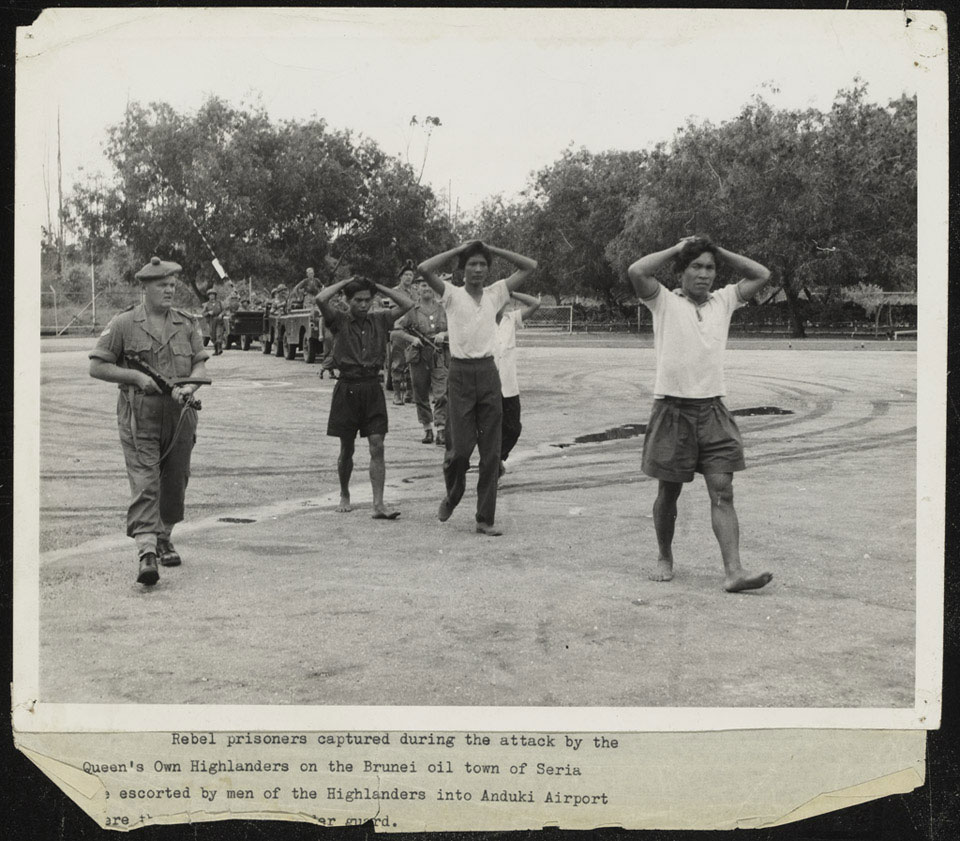
Rebel prisoners being marched by Queen's Own Highlanders to Anduki in 1962.

The aerodrome was opened in 1951, after a Supermarine Sea Otter owned by British Malaysian Petroleum was the first aeroplane to land in 1949 at what was then known as Anduki Aerodrome. In 1955, Malaysian Airways used a de Havilland Dragon Rapide to operate charter flights between Brunei Town, Anduki Airfield, Miri, and Labuan. British Malaysian Petroleum subsequently became Brunei Shell Petroleum (BSP), and its first helicopter, a Sikorsky S-55 loaned from Worldwide Helicopters, came into service.

The Queen's Own Highlanders, in support of the joint effort to suppress the Brunei revolt, boarded five Twin Pioneers and a Blackburn Beverley which landed at Anduki in 1962. In 1964, the Sikorsky S-61N came into service together as Brunei Shell Petroleum Aviation Services Department (SAV) formed. A few years later in 1966, SAV purchased three more S-61Ns.

In 1999, the Department of Civil Aviation (DCA) issued a commercial air operations certificate to SAV. The Sikorsky S-92 was introduced in 2005 to replace older aircraft.

On 14 May 2013, Sikorsky Aerospace Services announced plans for the conversion of BSP's Sikorsky S-92 into search and rescue (SAR) modifications; this became operational in 2014. On 17 June 2013, two AgustaWestland AW139 helicopters were delivered to BSP after the contract was awarded six months earlier. On 18 April 2017, Sikorsky recognised BSP for 50 years of service since the mid-1950s with five Sikorsky S-55, in which is the first product from the company to be used. On 27 May 2019, a milestone was set by Siti Saffawana for being the first Bruneian commander of the BSP Search and Rescue Department. It was announced in January 2024 that BSP had acquired a new Sikorsky S-92 (V8-BSP).

== Notable aircraft ==
Some aircraft which have been used or present on this airfield:

photo	aircraft	type	operator	status	ref
	Sikorsky HH-52; Seaguard	amphibious helicopter	Brunei; Shell; Petroleum (BSP)	retired	
	Sikorsky S-55	utility helicopter	Brunei; Shell; Petroleum (BSP)	retired	
	Aérospatiale; Alouette III	utility helicopter	Brunei; Shell; Petroleum (BSP)	retired	
	King Air 65-B90 (VR-UDV)	transport aircraft	Brunei; Shell; Petroleum (BSP)	retired	
	Beechcraft 99 (VR-UDW)	transport aircraft	Brunei; Shell; Petroleum (BSP)	retired	
	Sikorsky S-61N	transport helicopter	Brunei; Shell; Petroleum (BSP)	retired	
	Sikorsky S-92	transport helicopter	Brunei; Shell; Petroleum (BSP)	active	
	Sikorsky S-92	search & rescue helicopter	Brunei; Shell; Petroleum (BSP)	active	
	AgustaWestland; AW139	utility helicopter	Brunei; Shell; Petroleum (BSP)	active	
	Percival; Prince	transport aircraft	Brunei; Shell; Petroleum (BSP)	retired	
	Supermarine; Sea Otter	amphibious aircraft	Sarawak; Oilfields	retired	
	de Havilland; Dragon Rapide	airliner	Malaysian; Airlines	retired	

== Gallery ==
Anduki Airfield gallery of images
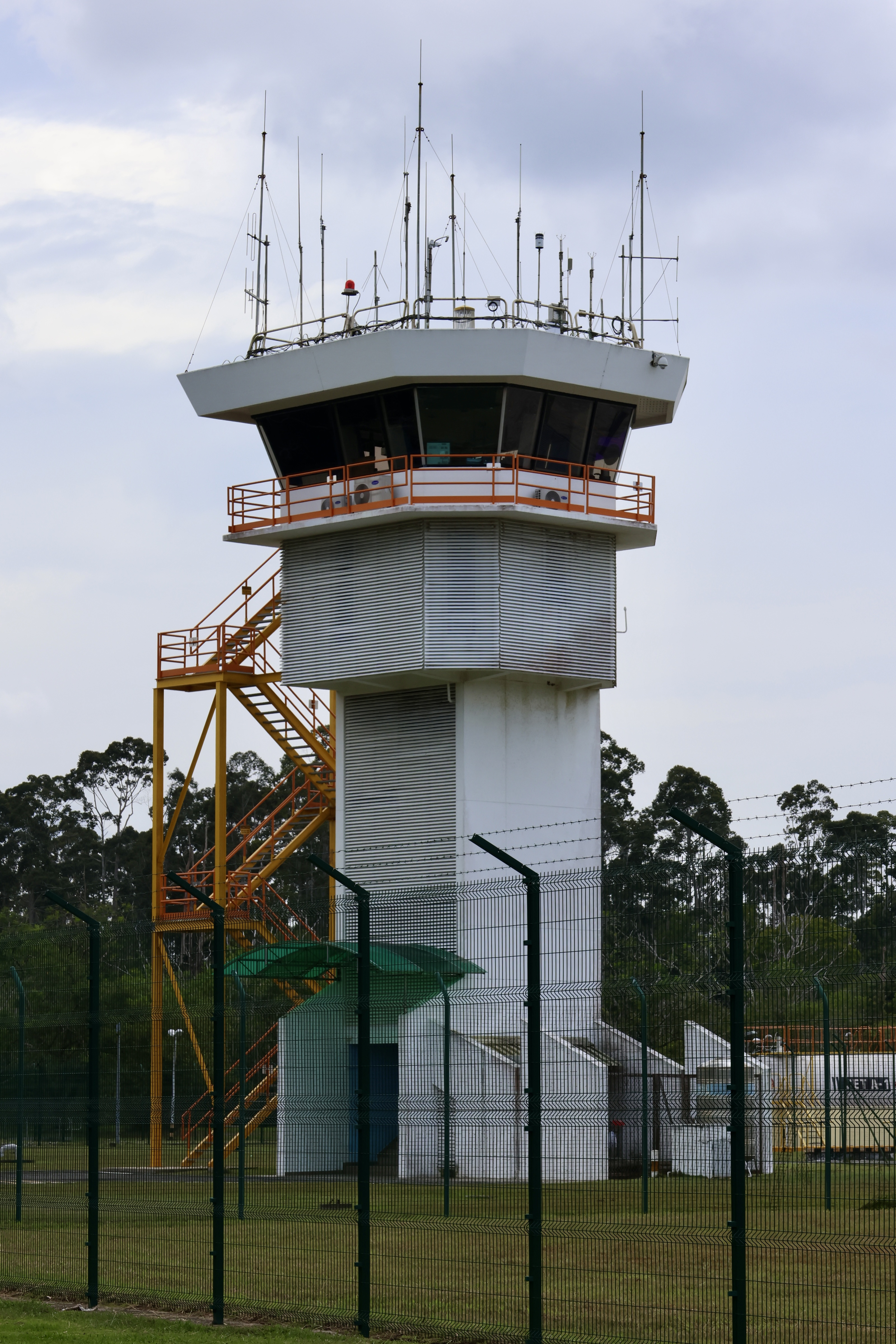
Anduki Airfield's air traffic control tower.

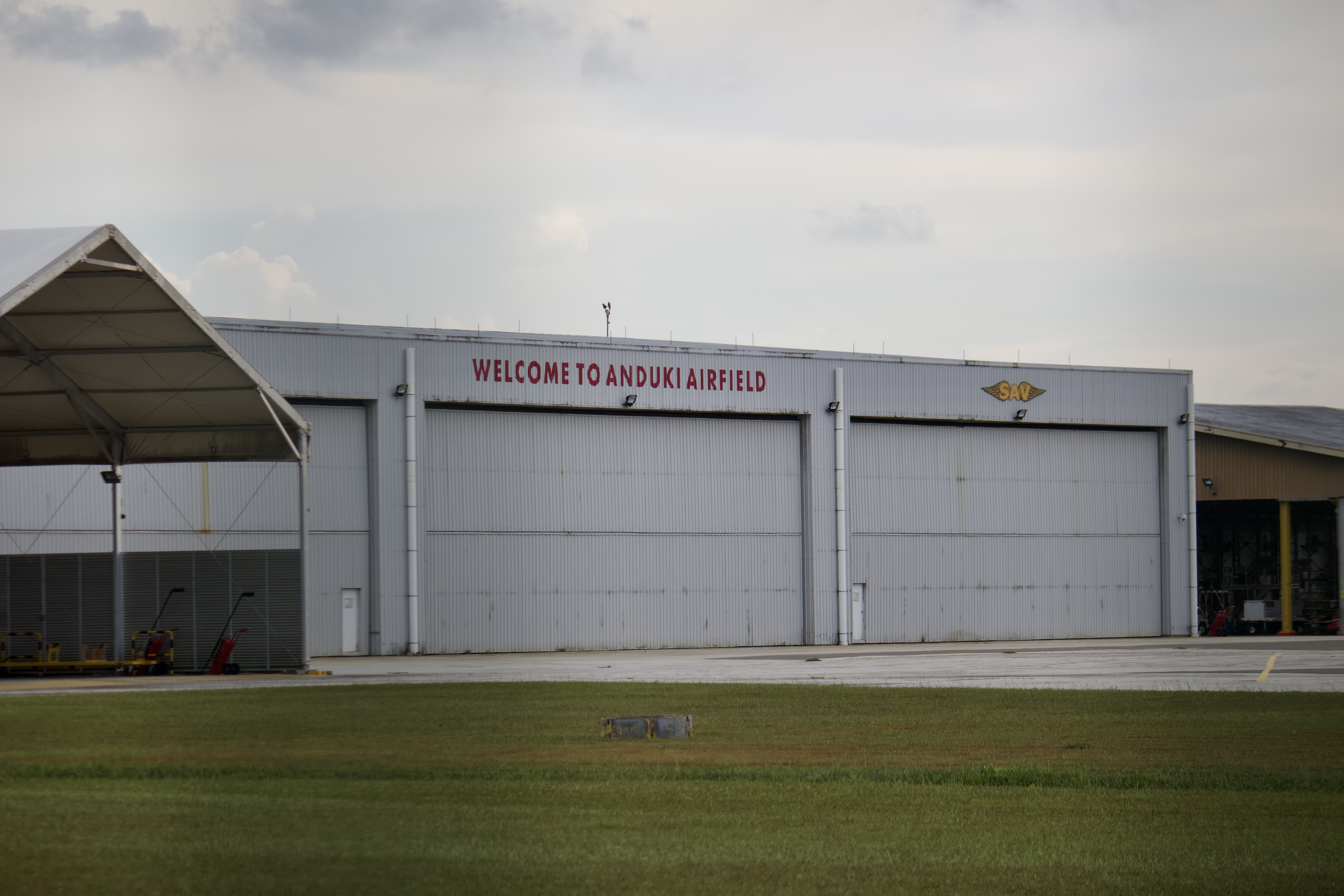
New hangars of Brunei Shell Petroleum Aviation Services Department (SAV) at Anduki Airfield.

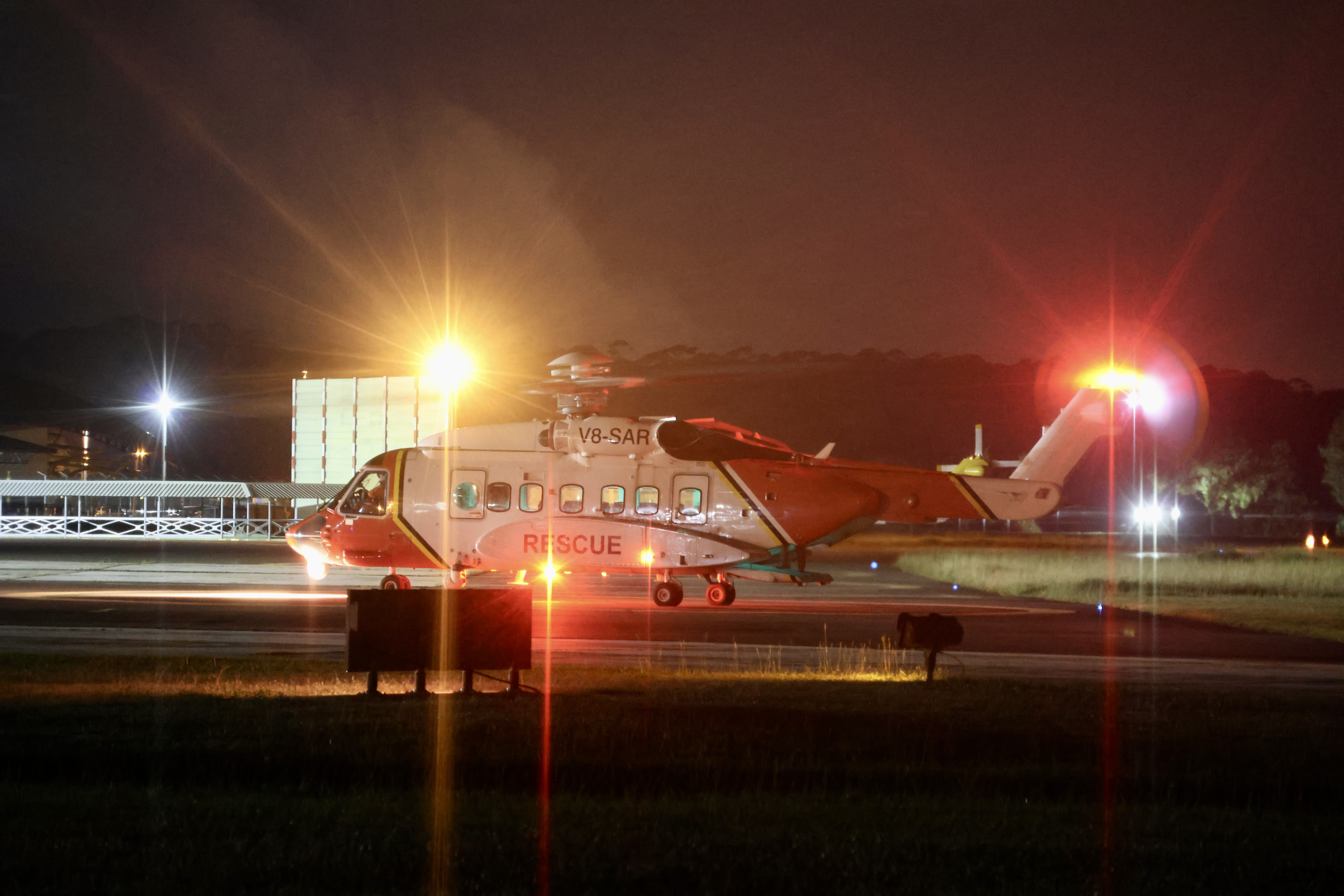
Sikorsky S-92 (V8-SAR) SAR during night operations.

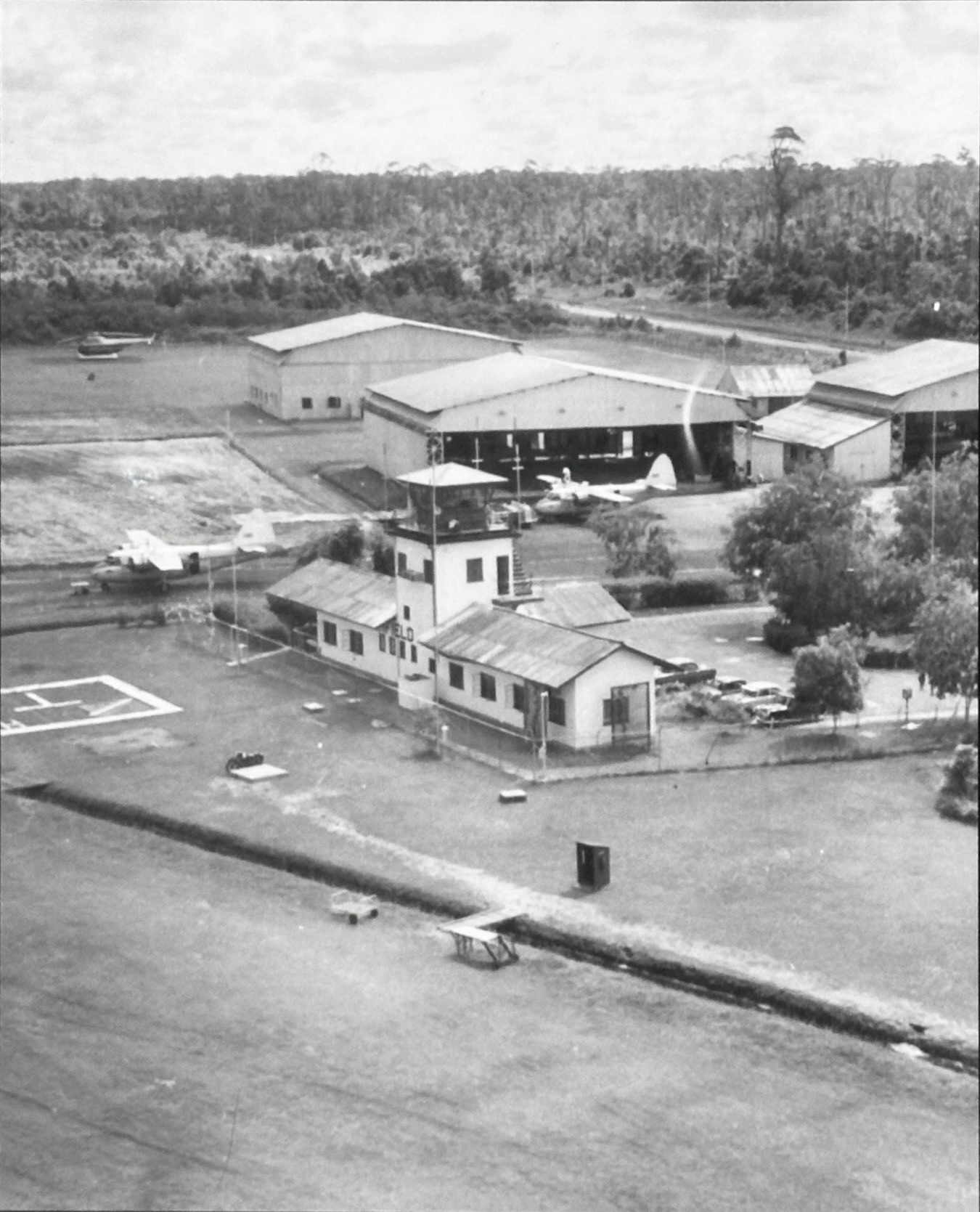
Aerial view of Anduki Airfield in 1967.

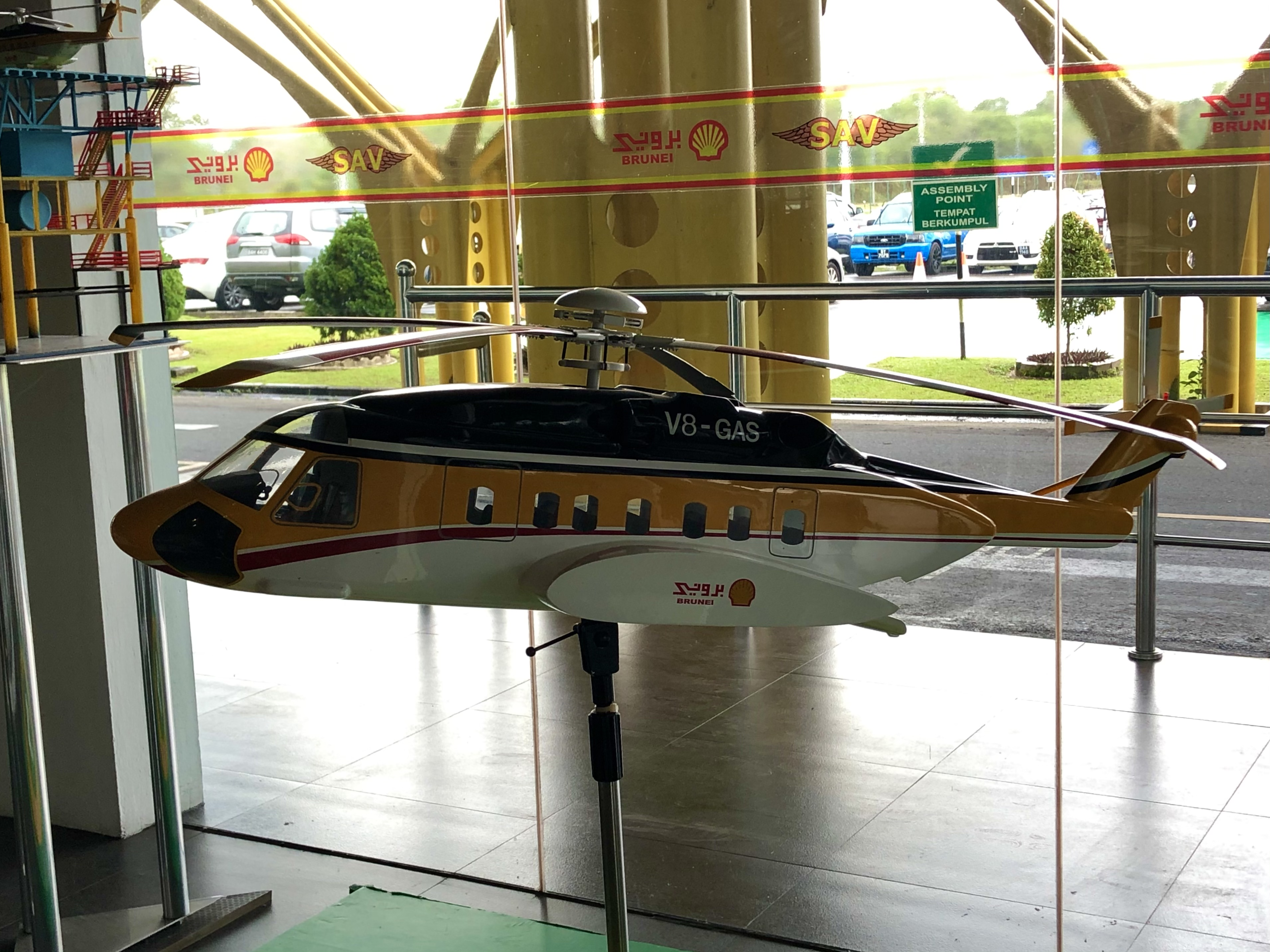
Brunei Shell Petroleum Sikorsky S-92 model inside Anduki Airfield.
