= PenAir Flight 3296 =

2019 aviation accident in Alaska

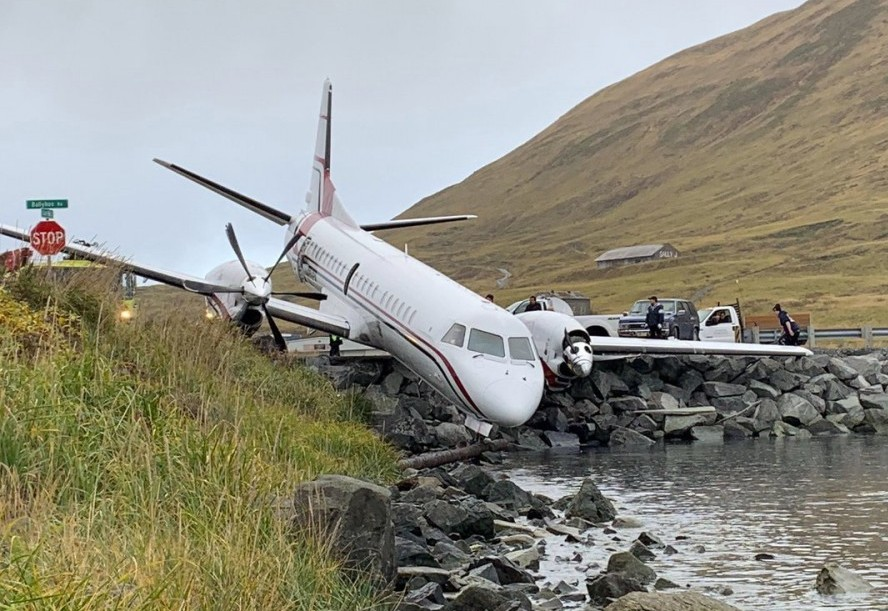
- The aircraft after overrunning the runway

Accident
- Date: October 17, 2019
- Summary: Runway excursion
- Site: Unalaska Airport, Dutch Harbor, Amaknak Island, Alaska; 53.8940°N 166.5373°W

Aircraft
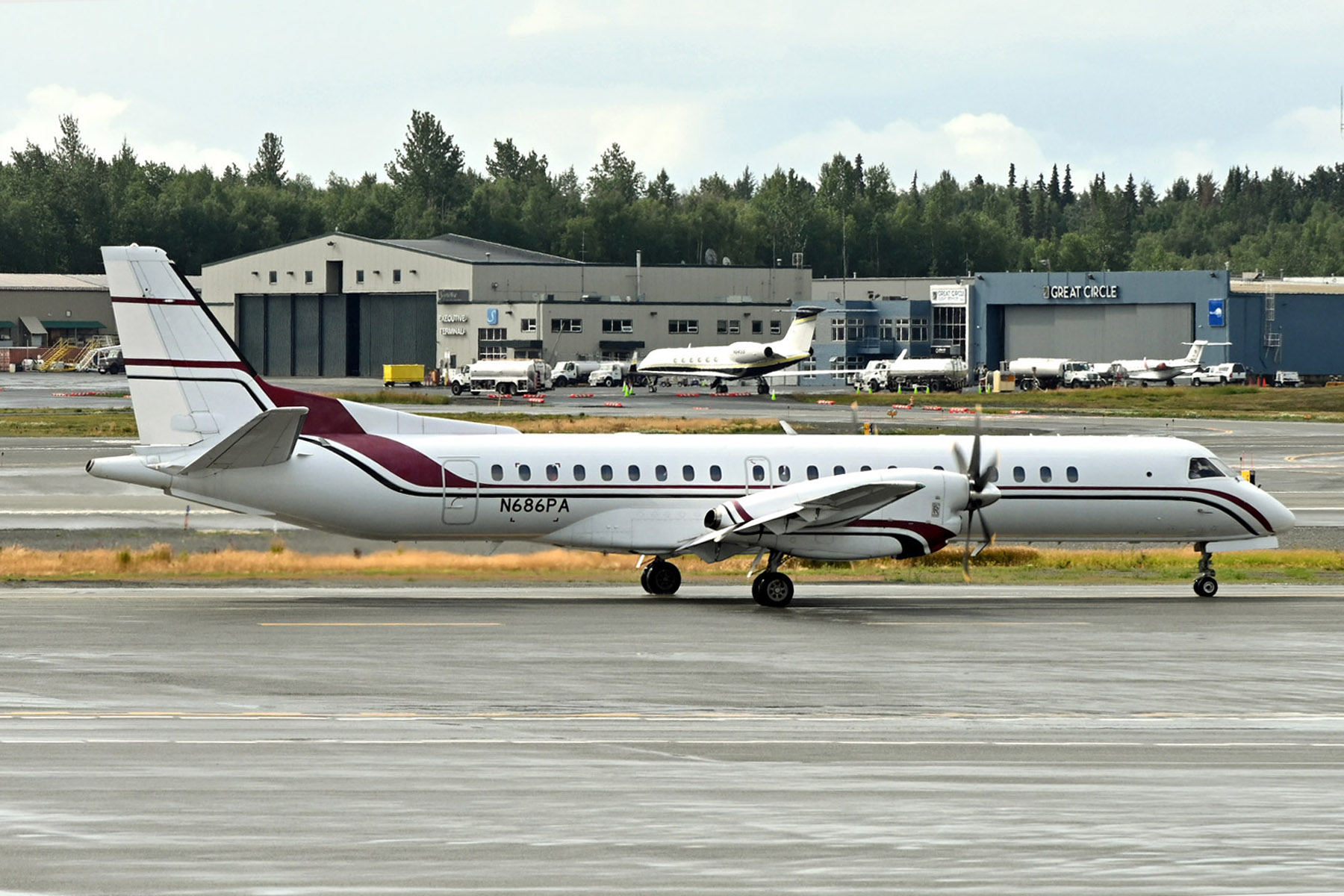
- N686PA, the aircraft involved in the accident, pictured in July 2019
- Aircraft type: Saab 2000
- Operator: PenAir
- IATA flight No.: 7H3296
- ICAO flight No.: NLA3296
- Call sign: PENINSULA 3296
- Registration: N686PA
- Flight origin: Ted Stevens Anchorage International Airport
- Destination: Unalaska Airport
- Occupants: 42
- Passengers: 39
- Crew: 3
- Fatalities: 1
- Injuries: 11
- Survivors: 41

PenAir Flight 3296 was a domestic scheduled flight from Ted Stevens Anchorage International Airport in Anchorage, Alaska, to Unalaska Airport on Amaknak Island in the Aleutian Chain of Alaska. On October 17, 2019, the Saab 2000 operating the flight overran the runway after landing at Unalaska Airport. Of the 42 passengers and crew on board, one passenger (identified as David Allan Oltman) was fatally injured when a propeller blade penetrated the fuselage, one was seriously injured and ten suffered minor injuries. The aircraft was substantially damaged during the accident and written off.

== Aircraft and Crew ==
The aircraft involved was a Saab 2000, registered N686PA. It was manufactured in 1995 and had a serial number of 2000-017. It was equipped with two Allison AE2100A turboprop engines.

The captain of the flight was 56-year-old Paul Wells. He had over 14,000 flight hours, with 131 being on the Saab 2000. The first officer was 39-year-old Justin Lunn. He also had about 14,000 hours.

== Accident ==
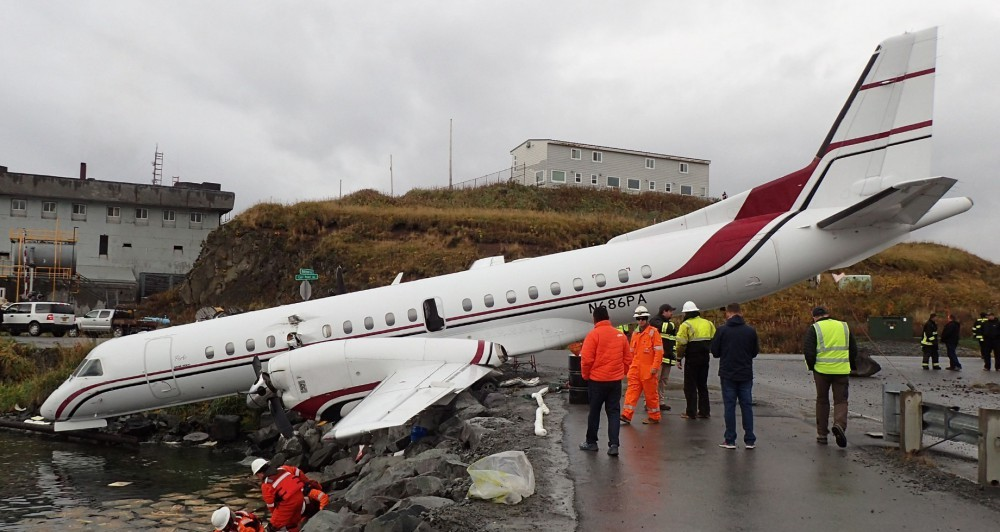
Another angle of the aftermath of N686PA

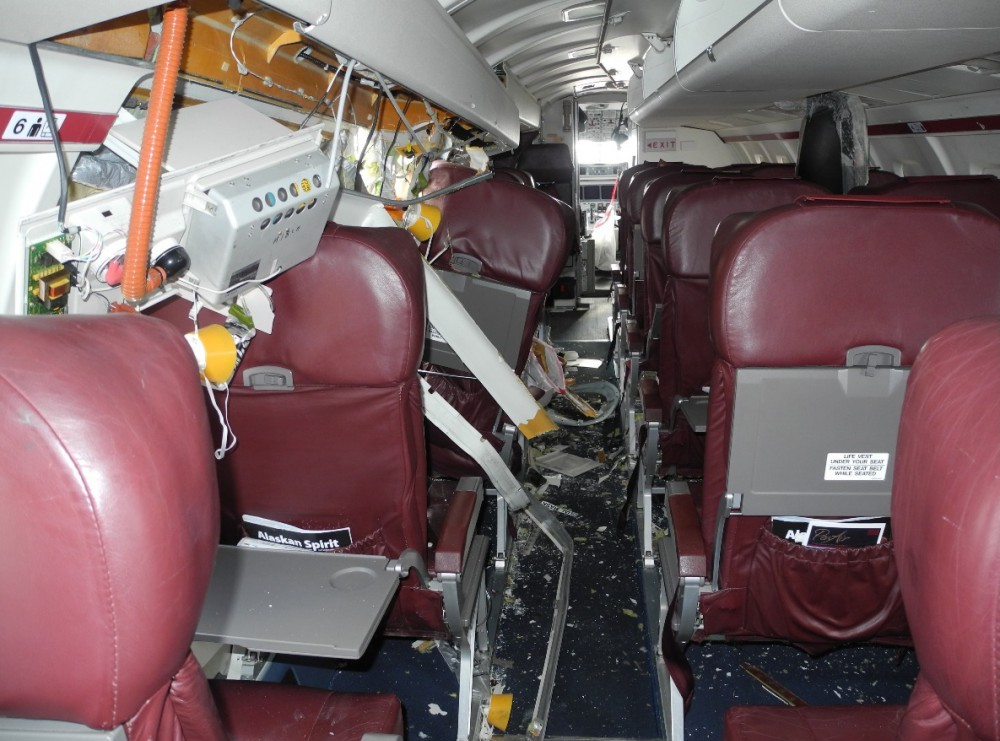
The damaged interior of the plane

On the day of the accident, the aircraft departed from Anchorage at 15:15 AST and was due to land at Unalaska two hours and 15 minutes later. While descending toward Unalaska, the crew received clearance for an RNAV approach to Runway 13, a 4,501-foot-long (1,372 m) runway. As the aircraft approached the airport, the wind changed from 210 degrees at 8 knots (9.2 mph; 14.8 km/h; 4.1 m/s) to 180 degrees at 7 knots (8.1 mph; 13.0 km/h; 3.6 m/s), but was reported as 270 degrees at 10 knots (11.5 mph; 18.5 km/h; 5.1 m/s). The aircraft became unstable and a go-around was executed. The flight returned for a visual approach onto Runway 13. The wind speed increased and the controller reported that winds were 300 degrees at 24 knots (28 mph; 44 km/h; 12 m/s).

According to the investigation report, the pilots believed there was a crosswind during the landing approach, based on seeing waves by the nearby shore and a windsock near the runway, but in contradiction to the weather control report and onboard witness statements.

The crew decided to continue with the landing and touched down at 17:40. The aircraft landed 1,001 feet (305 m) down the runway with reverse thrust and wheel-braking inputs by the captain. When the aircraft reached 80 knots (92 mph; 150 km/h), maximum braking was applied. As an overrun was imminent, the pilots steered the aircraft right to avoid going into the water past the runway end. Attempts to stop on the paved runway surface failed, and the aircraft crossed a section of grass and then broke through a chain perimeter fence and crossed a ditch. The aircraft struck a large rock, crossed a public roadway and finally came to a stop on the shore of Iliuliuk Bay. The port wing or propeller struck a 4–5-foot (1.2–1.5 m) signal post, the port propeller struck a 6-to-8-foot-high (1.8 to 2.4 m) yellow diamond shaped road sign, and again struck rock riprap as the plane came to a halt. This caused the port-side (left) propeller to shatter, sending debris and large pieces of the propeller blade into the fuselage. One of the blades was found inside the cabin. Two passengers were critically injured and another 10 had to receive medical care. David Allan Oltman died a day later.

== Investigation ==
On the day of the accident, the National Transportation Safety Board (NTSB) launched an investigation. Two years later, on November 2, 2021, the final report was released, which stated that the accident had been caused by "the landing gear manufacturer's incorrect wiring of the wheel speed transducer harnesses on the left main landing gear during overhaul." Saab's design of wire harnesses, the Federal Aviation Administration (FAA) authorizing Unalaska Airport to operate the Saab 2000 without taking the runway safety area into consideration first, and the flight crew's decision to land in a tailwind that exceeded Saab's limits (which the NTSB labeled as inappropriate) were also factors in the accident.

== In popular culture ==
The deadly incident involving PenAir Flight 3296 was featured in the 2024 episode "Disaster at Dutch Harbor", of the Canadian-made, internationally distributed documentary series Mayday.

== See also ==
- Swiss International Air Lines Flight 850
- List of accidents and incidents involving commercial aircraft
- 2019 in aviation
