= Miami Air International Flight 293 =

2019 aviation accident in Florida

Coordinates: 30.2318°N 81.6703°W

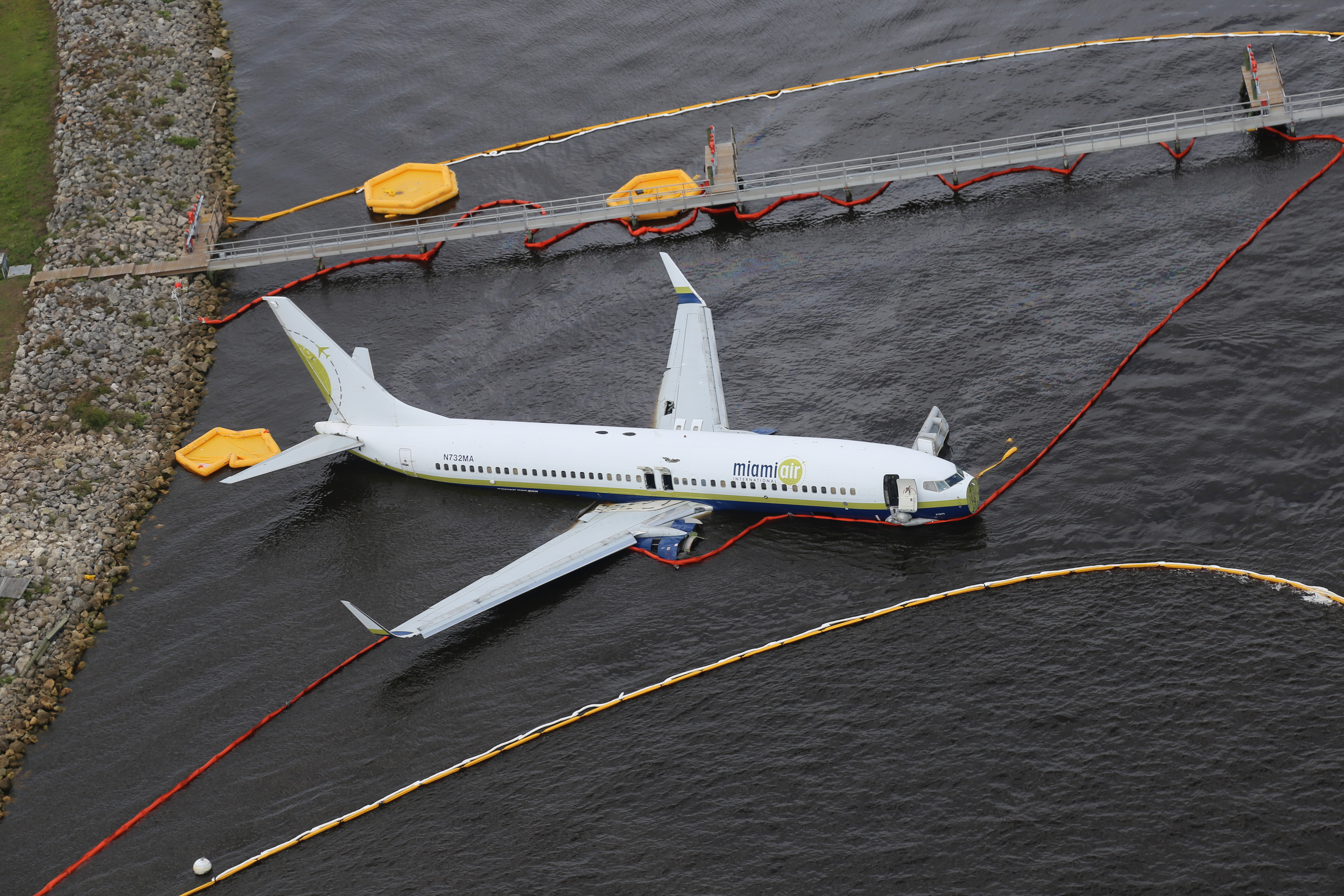
- The aircraft resting in the St. Johns River

Accident
- Date: May 3, 2019
- Summary: Runway excursion due to hydroplaning
- Site: St. Johns River, near Naval Air Station Jacksonville, Florida

Aircraft
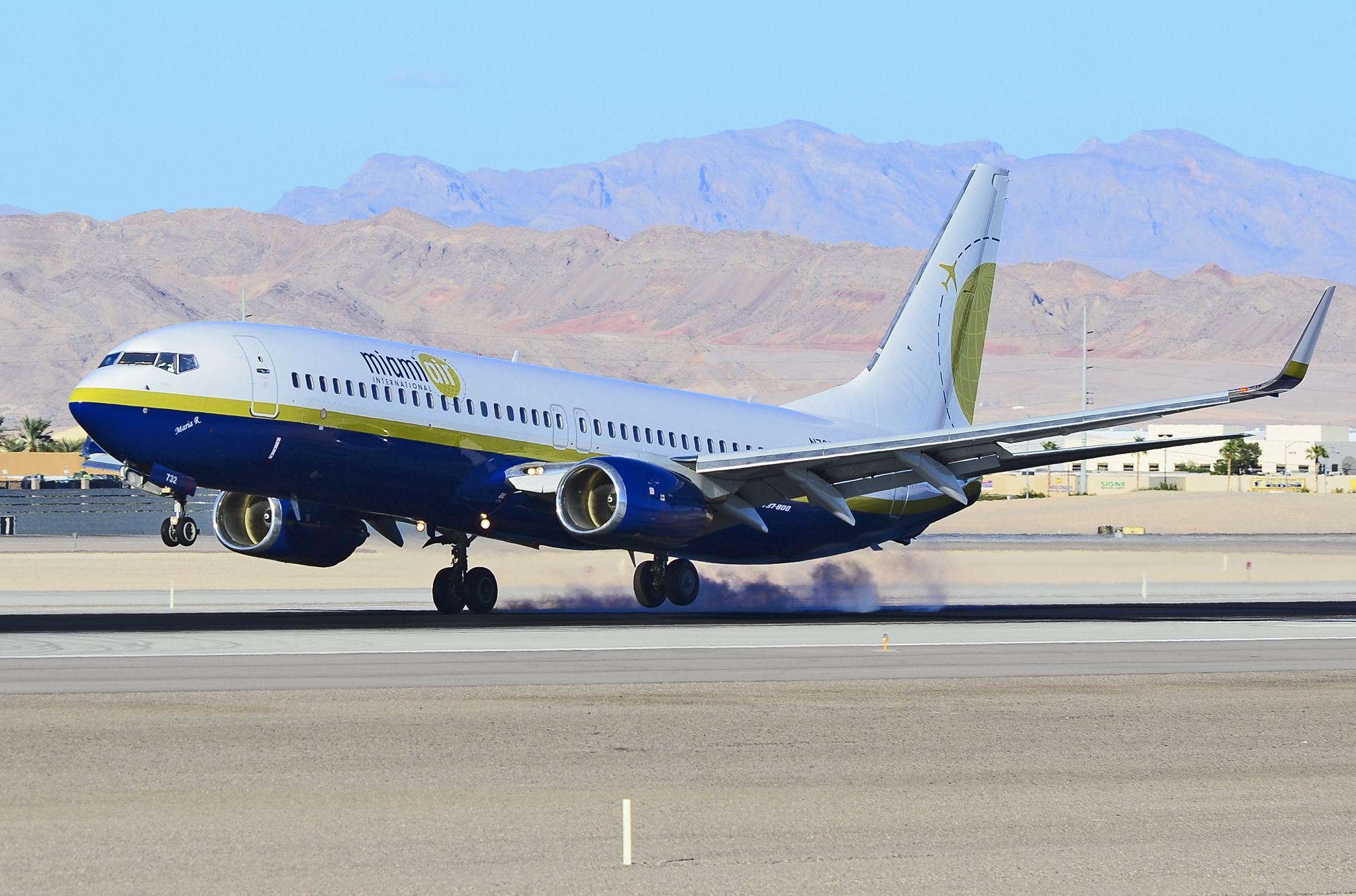
- N732MA, the aircraft involved in the accident, photographed in 2013
- Aircraft type: Boeing 737-81Q
- Aircraft name: Maria R.
- Operator: Miami Air International
- IATA flight No.: LL293
- ICAO flight No.: BSK293
- Call sign: BISCAYNE 293
- Registration: N732MA
- Flight origin: Leeward Point Field, Guantanamo Bay, Cuba
- Destination: Naval Air Station Jacksonville, Florida, United States
- Occupants: 143
- Passengers: 136
- Crew: 7
- Fatalities: 0
- Injuries: 21
- Survivors: 143

Miami Air International Flight 293 was a military charter from Guantanamo Bay to Naval Air Station Jacksonville, operated by Miami Air International. On May 3, 2019, the Boeing 737-800 aircraft operating the flight overran the runway on landing. Twenty-one people were injured. The aircraft was written off, making it the 17th loss of a Boeing 737-800. The National Transportation Safety Board (NTSB) attributed the accident to hydroplaning caused by heavy rainfall on the ungrooved runway; although the pilots were found to have made a series of errors during final approach and landing, the NTSB concluded that these errors had little effect on the final outcome, as the aircraft would have been unable to stop even if the landing had been executed properly.

== Accident ==
Miami Air International Flight 293 was a supplemental non-scheduled passenger flight from Leeward Point Field, Guantanamo Bay, Cuba to Naval Air Station Jacksonville, Florida. It served to transport military personnel and related civilians. The aircraft, a Boeing 737-800, skidded off the runway at Jacksonville into the St. Johns River while attempting to land in a thunderstorm. Emergency services, including more than 50 firefighters, rescued all 136 passengers and seven crew.

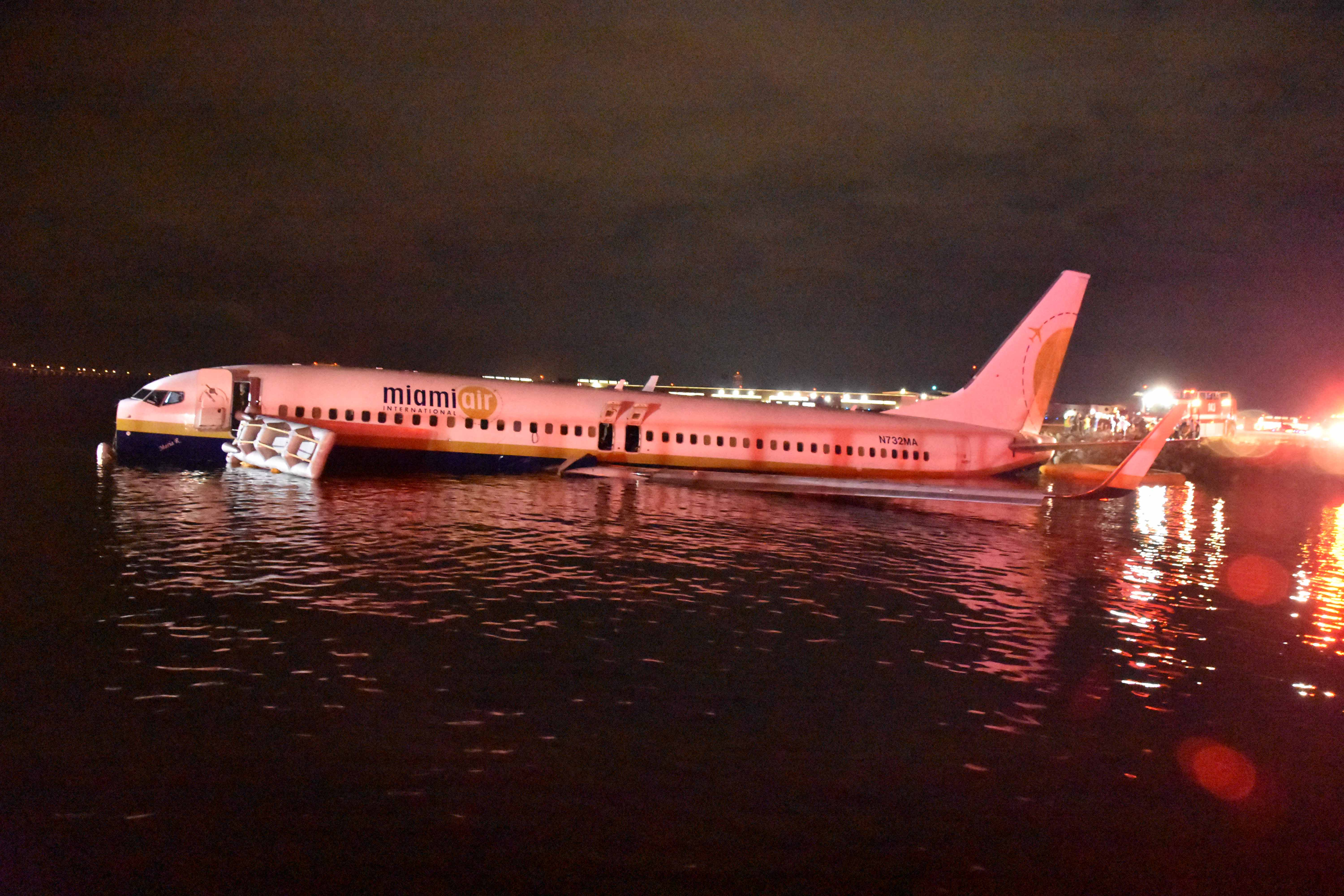
The aircraft in the St. Johns River at nighttime

The plane was never submerged; however, many passengers in the front and mid section of the plane were soaked when brackish water entered through breaches in the fuselage. There was also several inches of water in the rows in the back of the plane. Twenty-one people were injured and transported to the hospital, but there were no critical injuries. At least three pets transported in the hold of the aircraft are presumed to have died. Authorities were concerned about fuel spreading in the river and worked to contain it.

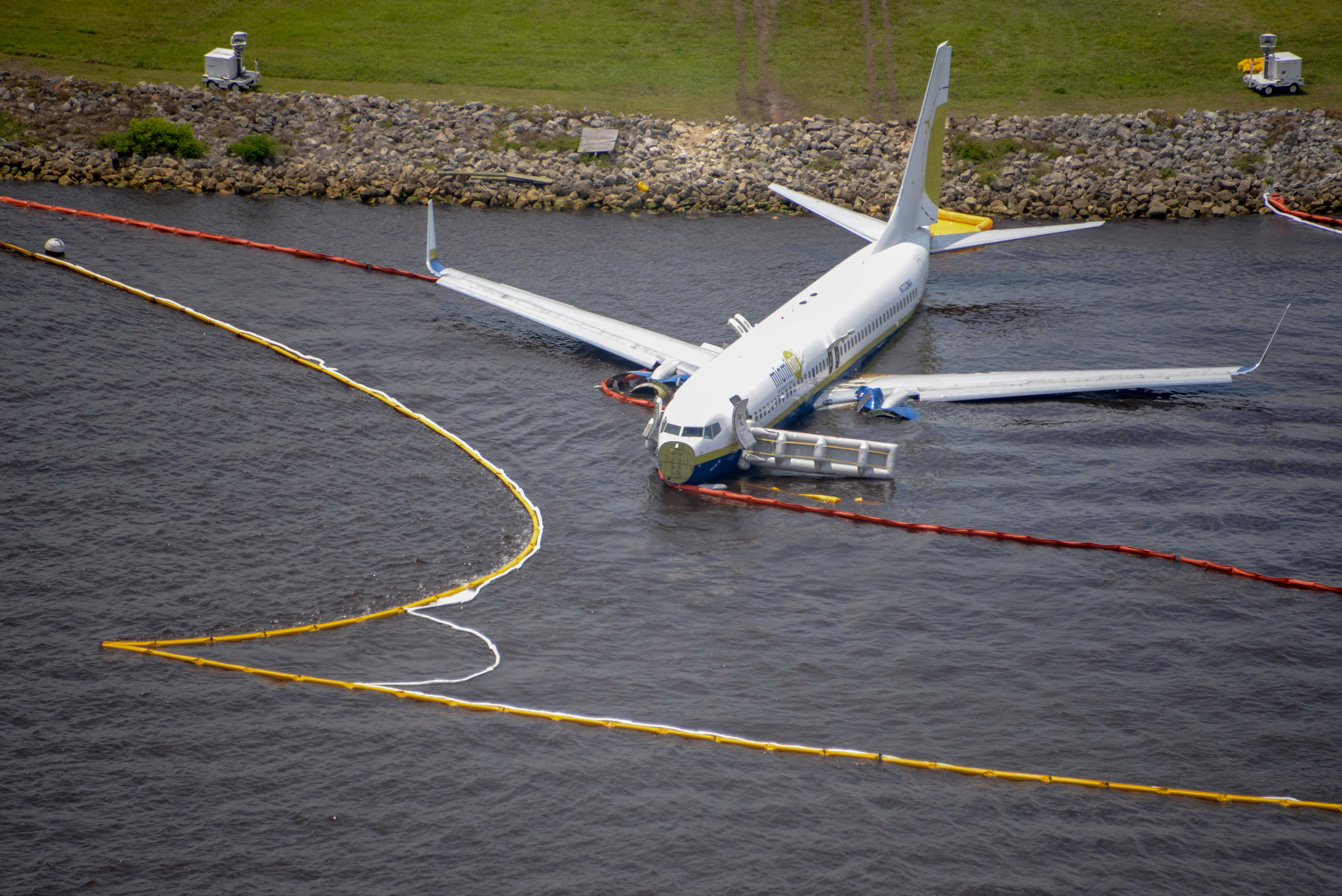
Another view of the aircraft in the St. Johns River

== Aircraft and crew ==
The aircraft involved was a Boeing 737-81Q, registered as N732MA, MSN 30618, Line Number 830. The aircraft first flew on April 12, 2001 and was delivered to Miami Air on April 26. The aircraft was equipped with two CFM International CFM56-7B26 engines. At the time of the accident, it had flown for 38,928 hours 57 minutes in 15,610 flights.

In command was 55-year-old Captain Gabriel Cosentino, who had been with Miami Air since 2008 and had 7,500 flight hours, including 1,000 hours on the Boeing 737. Cosentino was also a check airman at the airline and held several instructor positions. The first officer was 47-year-old Claudio Marcelo Jose La Franca, who had only been with the airline for five months. He had the same amount of flight hours as captain Cosentino (7,500), but only 18 of them were on the Boeing 737.

== Investigation ==
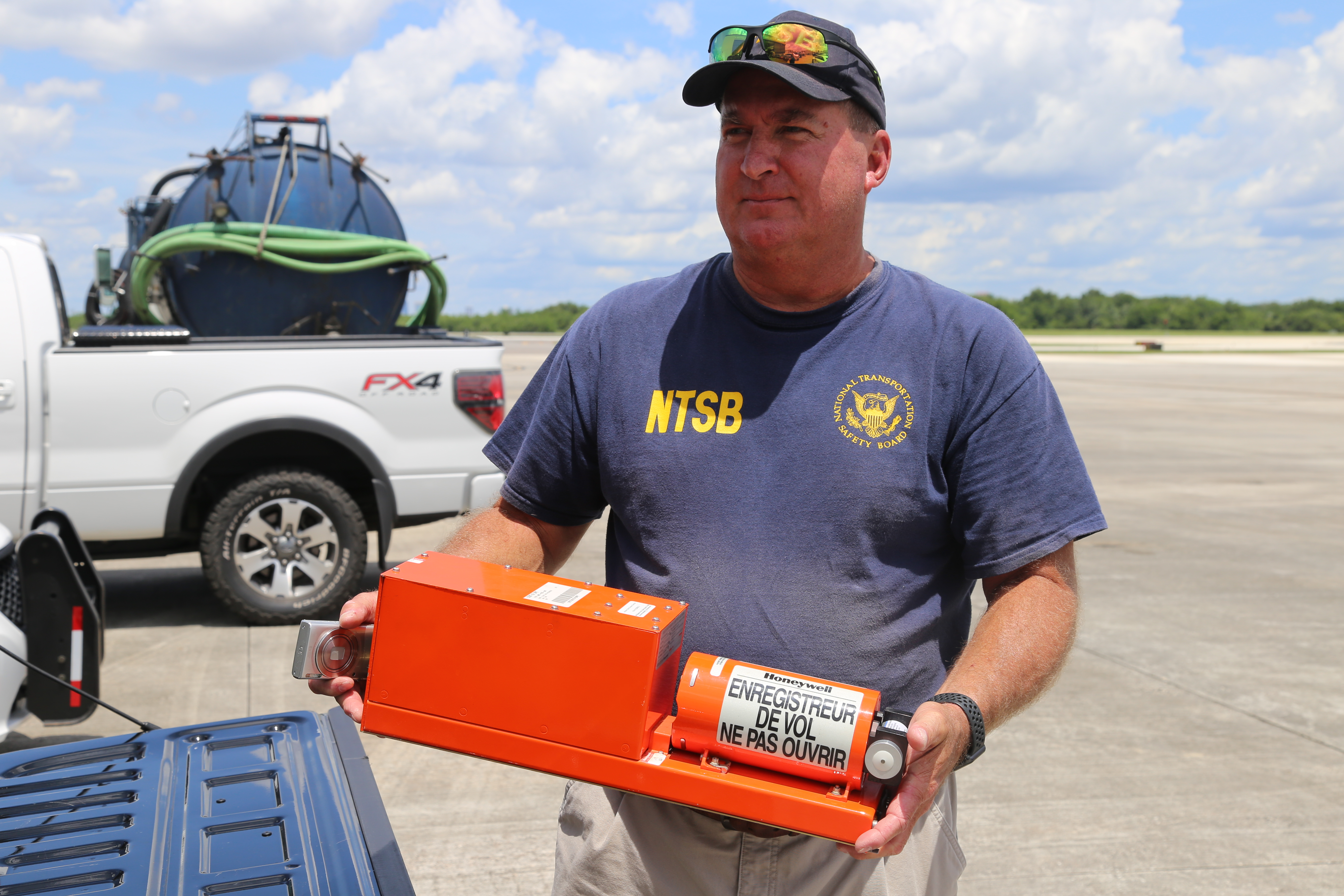
A NTSB investigator holding the flight data recorder from Flight 293

The accident was investigated by the National Transportation Safety Board (NTSB), Boeing, and the United States Navy. Initial causes of the investigation focused on a possible failure of the thrust reverser and the pilot's request to change runways.

The left hand thrust reverser was inoperative at the time of takeoff, as allowed per the master minimum equipment list, which made the thrust reversers unavailable after the aircraft landed.

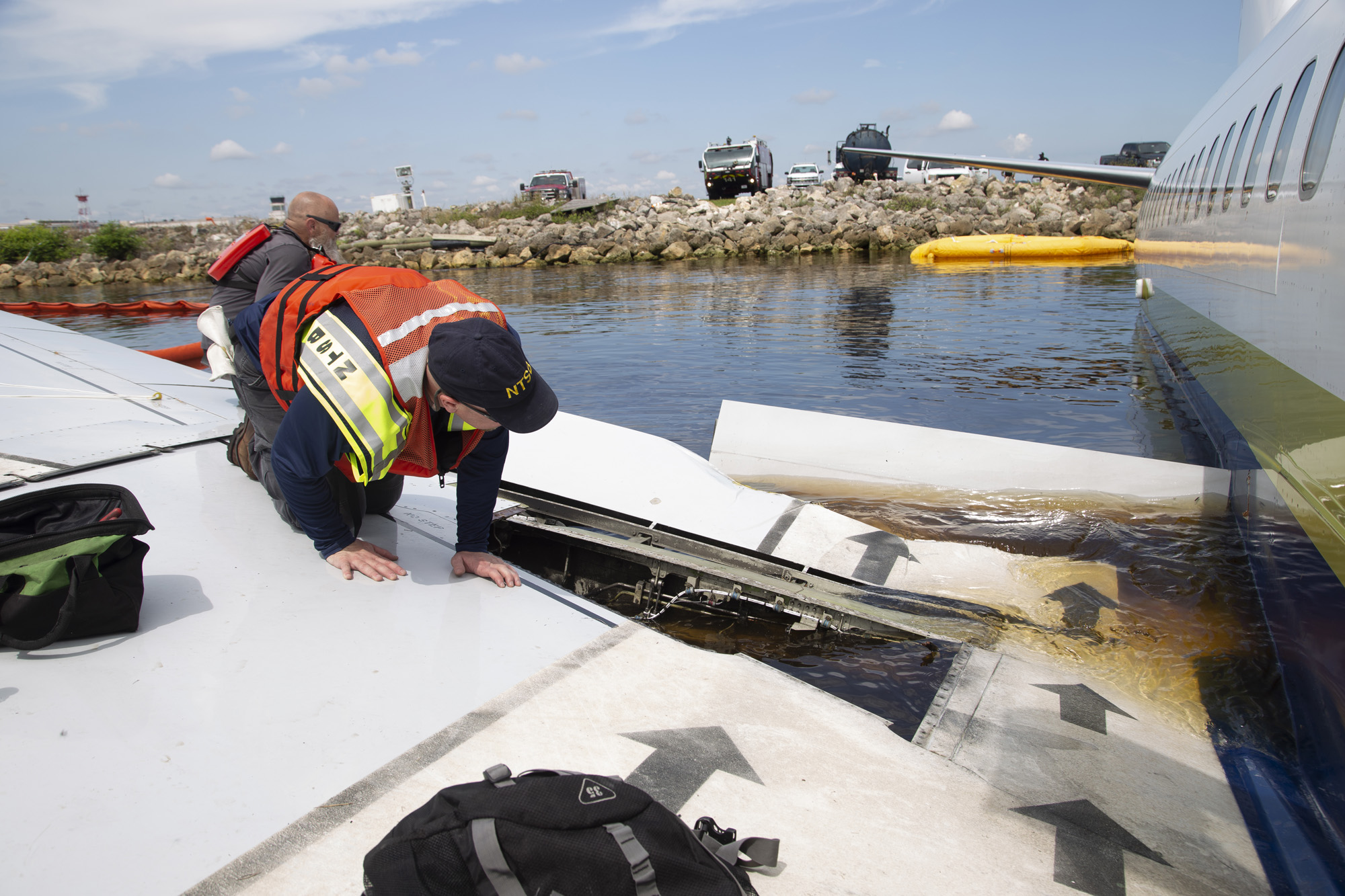
A NTSB investigator examining the Landing gear

During the landing approach, the pilot checked in with the Jacksonville tower at 9:22:19 PM; the approach controller advised the pilot to land on Runway 28. The recorded weather conditions at 9:22 PM included heavy rain and thunderstorms with wind from 350° at 4 kn (7.4 km/h; 4.6 mph). Thunderstorms had begun at 9:04 PM. Although the aircraft was advised to land on Runway 28 (east to west), which is 9,000 ft (2,700 m) long, the pilot requested if the opposite direction (west to east, designated Runway 10) was available at 9:23:25 PM; the tower advised the pilot that rain was building approximately 5 miles (8.0 km) from the approach to Runway 10. In addition, using Runway 10 would reduce the available landing distance to 7,800 ft (2,400 m) due to the displaced threshold resulting from the presence of arresting gear at the west end of the runway.

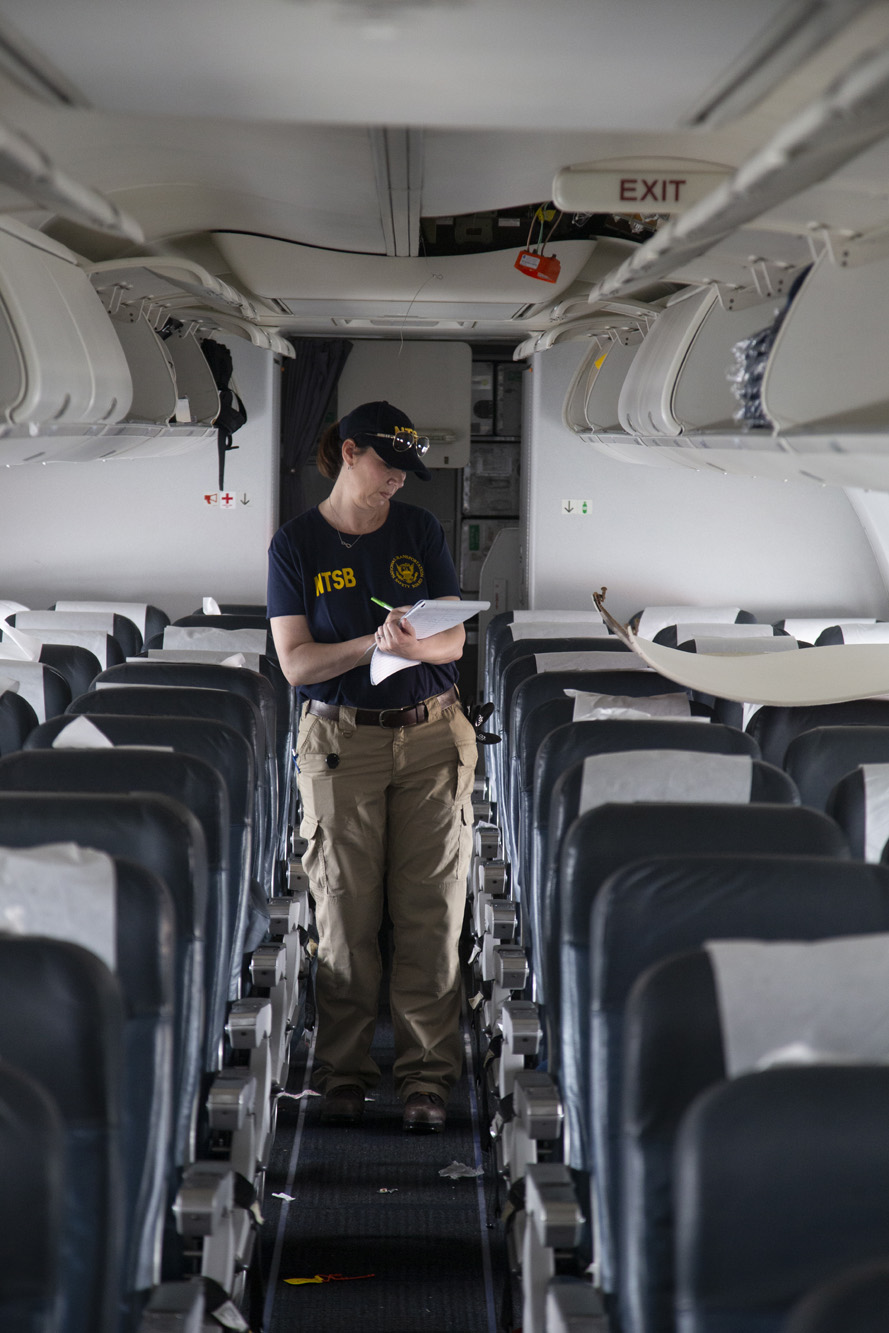
A NTSB investigator examining the aircraft cabin

At 9:24:55 PM, the pilot radioed the tower again to get advice on whether to use Runway 28 or 10; the tower controller said both were "pretty rough" and "pretty socked in", but the winds continued to favor the use of 28. The tower directed the pilot to turn right to a heading of 010° and descend and maintain an altitude of 3,000 ft (910 m) at 9:26:11 PM; tower control then directed the pilot to a heading of 040° at 9:27:56 PM. At 9:30:03 PM, the controller advised the pilot the storm was moving east, favoring the approach to Runway 10, and the pilot agreed to redirect to 10. After the pilot was handed off to the radar controller, radar control cleared the aircraft for landing at 9:39:49 PM.

Post-accident investigation showed the aircraft touched down approximately 1,600 feet (490 m) beyond the displaced threshold and veered right, reaching approximately 75 feet (23 m) from the Runway 10 centerline at a point 6,200 feet (1,900 m) from the displaced threshold. At that point, the aircraft had departed from the runway surface, later striking the seawall/embankment.

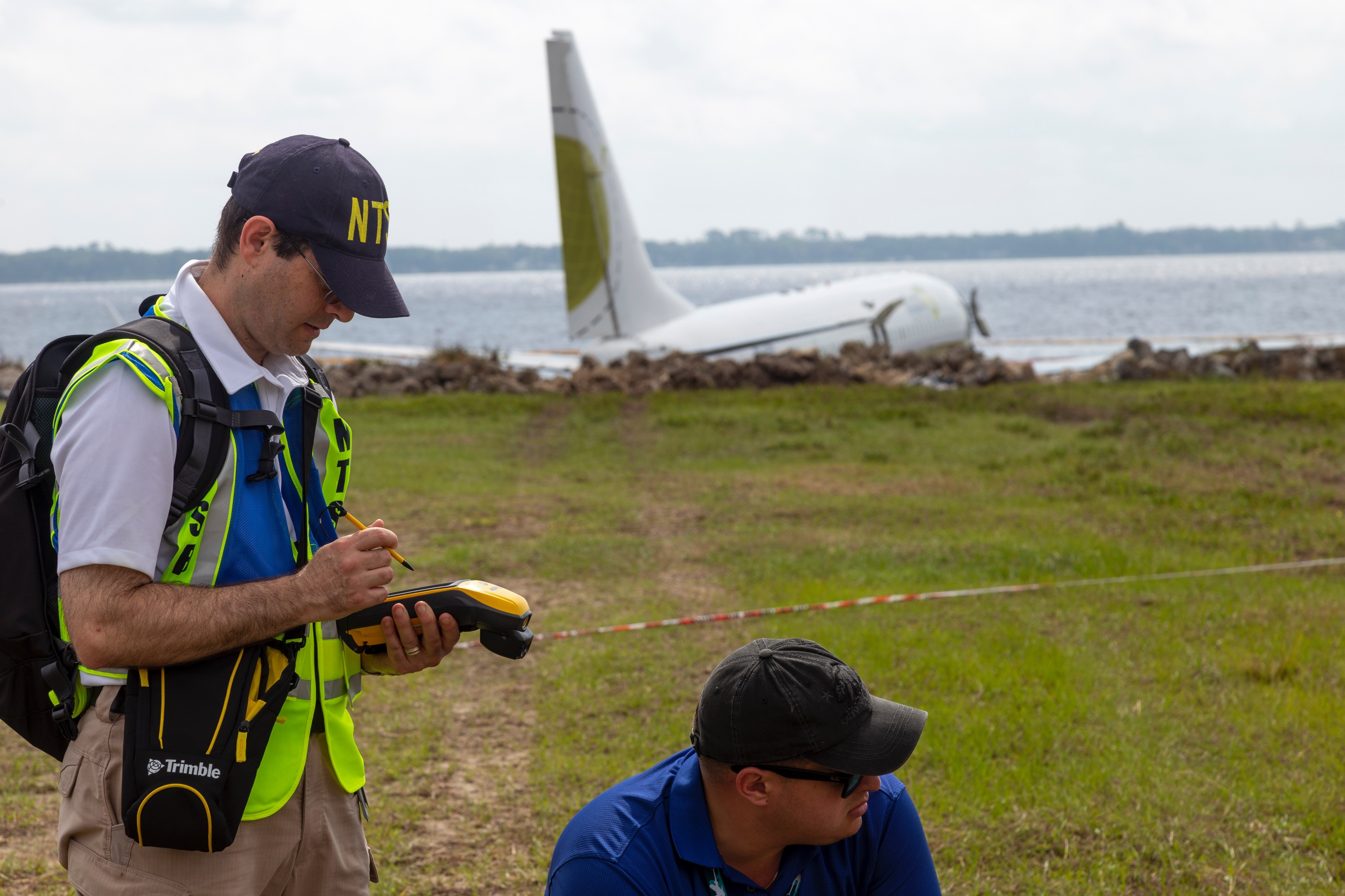
NTSB investigators recording measurements of the ground marks

A week after the accident, the aircraft was lifted onto a barge and floated up the St. Johns River and moved to shore at Reynolds Industrial Park in Green Cove Springs. After the NTSB investigation concluded, the plane was scrapped. The NTSB issued an update to their investigation on May 23, 2019.

On August 4, 2021, the NTSB published its final report, attributing the accident to a lack of runway grooving, which caused hydroplaning on touchdown and poor braking. This was aggravated by the airline's inadequate runway evaluation guidelines, the flight crew's failure to abort the approach (which was unstabilized due to the captain's heavy workload), excessive airspeed on touchdown, the first officer's limited experience in heavy jets like the 737, and the pilots' failure to promptly deploy the speed brakes; however, the NTSB concluded that even if these errors had not occurred, the aircraft would still have been unable to stop under the prevailing conditions.

== See also ==
- US Airways Flight 1549
- Air France Flight 358
- Air India Express Flight 812
- Air India Express Flight 1344
- American Airlines Flight 331
- Lion Air Flight 904
- Air Niugini Flight 73
- TAM Airlines Flight 3054
- Atlantic Airways Flight 670
