= China Aviation Supplies Holding Company =

Chinese aircraft lessor

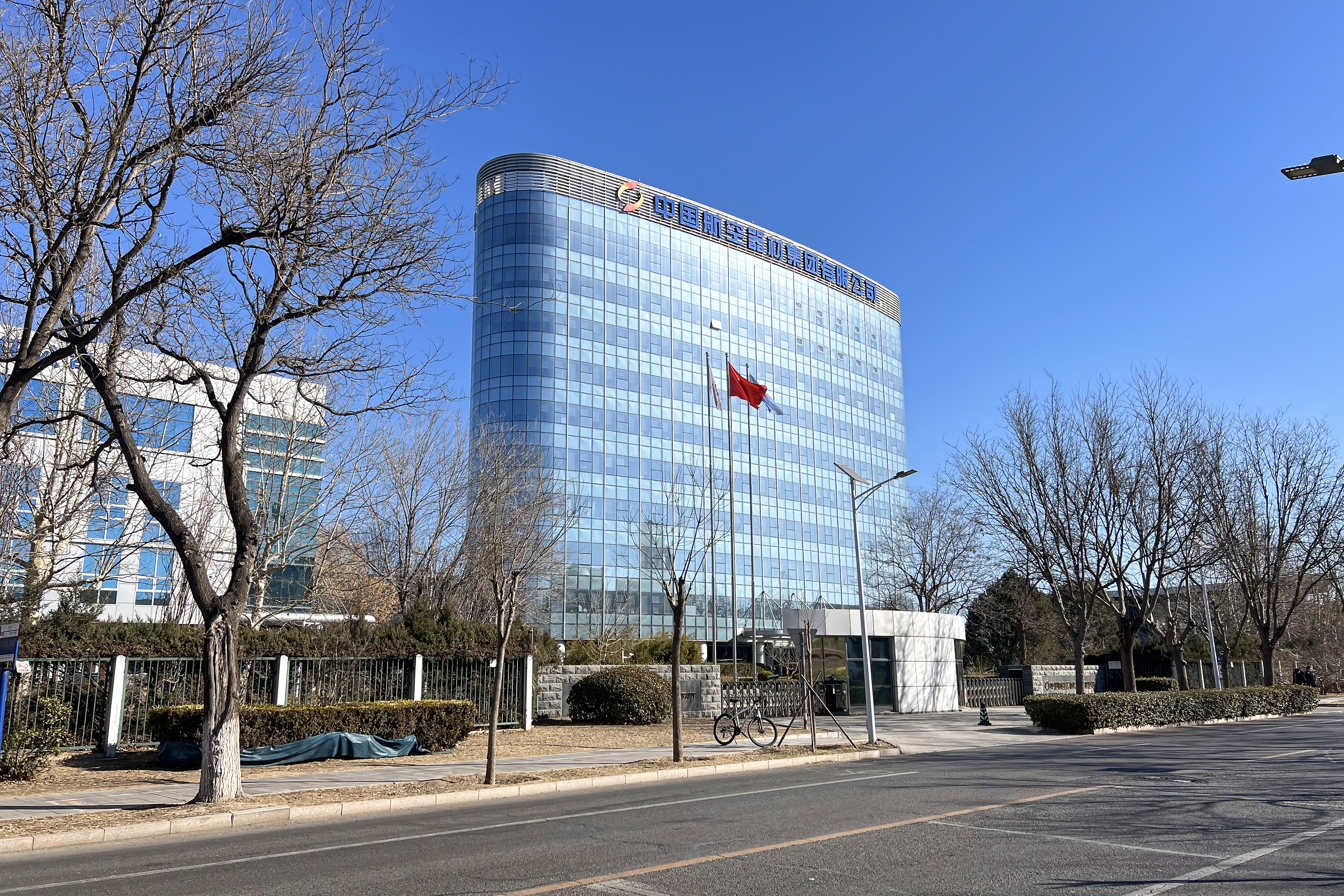
- Headquarters
- Industry: Aircraft Leasing
- Founded: 2002
- Headquarters: Beijing, China
- Parent: Civil Aviation Administration of China
- Website: casc.com.cn

China Aviation Supplies Holding Company (CASC) is a Chinese aircraft lessor established in October 2002 and succeeding China Aviation Supplies Import & Export Group Corporation and was founded in 1980. It offers operating lease, aircraft trading, sale-leaseback, asset management and engineering services, aircraft maintenance and manufacturing, flight training and support services, consulting, property management, advertising and IT, it has 14 framework agreements with Airbus and Boeing. Of the six holding companies of China's Civil Aviation Administration, it was the first established.

On 9 November 2017, CASC ordered 300 Boeing planes for US$37 billion at list prices (a $123M average) during Donald Trump's China visit. The order could include 260 737s and 40 B787/B777s. On 25 March 2019, during Chinese leader Xi Jinping's state visit to France, CASC ordered 290 Airbus A320 and 10 Airbus A350, worth $34 billion at list prices before discounts.
