= Japan Air Lines Cargo Flight 46E =

1993 Aviation accident over Alaska

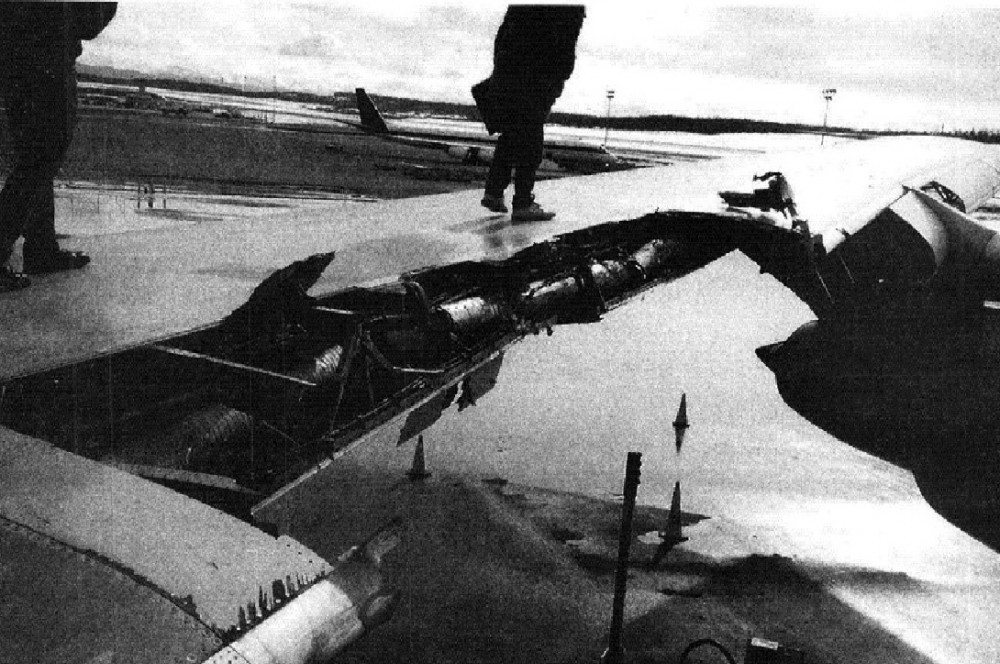
- The damage

Accident
- Date: 31 March 1993
- Summary: Severe turbulence resulting in-flight detachment of engine No. 2
- Site: Over Alaska, United States; 61°10′N 149°56′W

Aircraft
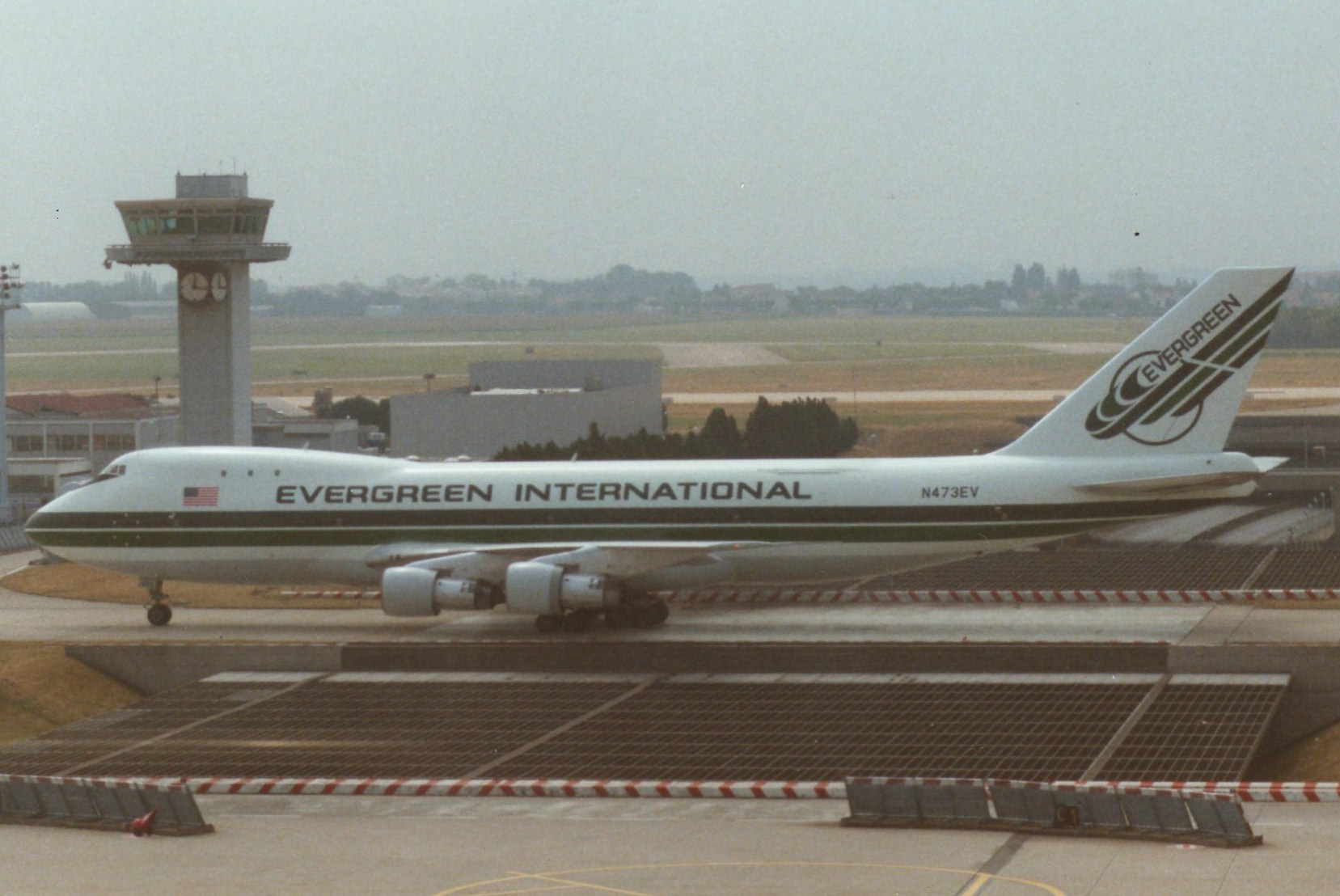
- N473EV, the aircraft involved in the accident, photographed in 1989
- Aircraft type: Boeing 747-121F
- Operator: Evergreen International Airlines on behalf of Japan Air Lines
- IATA flight No.: JL46E
- ICAO flight No.: JAL46E
- Call sign: JAPAN AIR 46 ECHO
- Registration: N473EV
- Flight origin: Anchorage International Airport, Anchorage, Alaska, United States
- Destination: O'Hare International Airport, Chicago, Illinois, United States
- Occupants: 5
- Passengers: 2
- Crew: 3
- Fatalities: 0
- Survivors: 5

Japan Air Lines Cargo Flight 46E was a scheduled cargo flight on 31 March 1993, operated by a Boeing 747-100 for Evergreen International Airlines, on behalf of Japan Air Lines, from Anchorage International Airport, in Anchorage, Alaska, to O'Hare International Airport, in Chicago. After departure, while climbing through 2,000 feet, the pylon for engine two detached, causing the whole engine to fall off the wing. The pilots managed to land the 747 back at Anchorage without further incident.

The NTSB concluded that the lateral separation of the No. 2 engine pylon was possibly due to an encounter with severe or possibly extreme turbulence that resulted in dynamic multi-axis lateral loadings that exceeded the ultimate Iateral load-carrying capability of the pylon, which was already reduced by the presence of the fatigue crack near the forward end of the pylon's forward firewall web.

== Aircraft and crew ==
The aircraft was a 23-year-old Boeing 747–121 registered as N473EV that first flew in 1970 as a passenger aircraft. It had been previously operated by Pan Am, and TWA before being converted into a freighter and delivered to Evergreen International Airlines in December 1988. The aircraft was powered by four Pratt & Whitney JT9D-7D turbofan engines.

The 42-year-old male captain had been with Evergreen International Airlines since 1987 and had logged more than 10,000 flight hours, including 750 hours on the Boeing 747. The 47-year-old male first officer had been with the airline since 1991 and 10,500 flight hours, 600 of them on the Boeing 747. The 33-year-old female flight engineer had been with Evergreen since 1989 and had 2,600 flight hours. She was the most experienced on the Boeing 747, having logged 1,201 hours on it.

== Flight ==
JAL Flight 46E departed Anchorage about 12:24 local time. The flight release/weather package provided to the pilots by Evergreen operations contained a forecast for severe turbulence and indicated that severe turbulence was reported by other airplanes. As Flight 46E taxied onto the runway to await takeoff clearance, the local controller informed "the flight crew that the pilot of another Evergreen Boeing 747 reported severe turbulence at 2,500 feet (760 m) while climbing out from runway 06R." After takeoff, at an altitude of about 2,000 feet (600 m), the airplane experienced an uncommanded left bank of approximately 50 degrees.

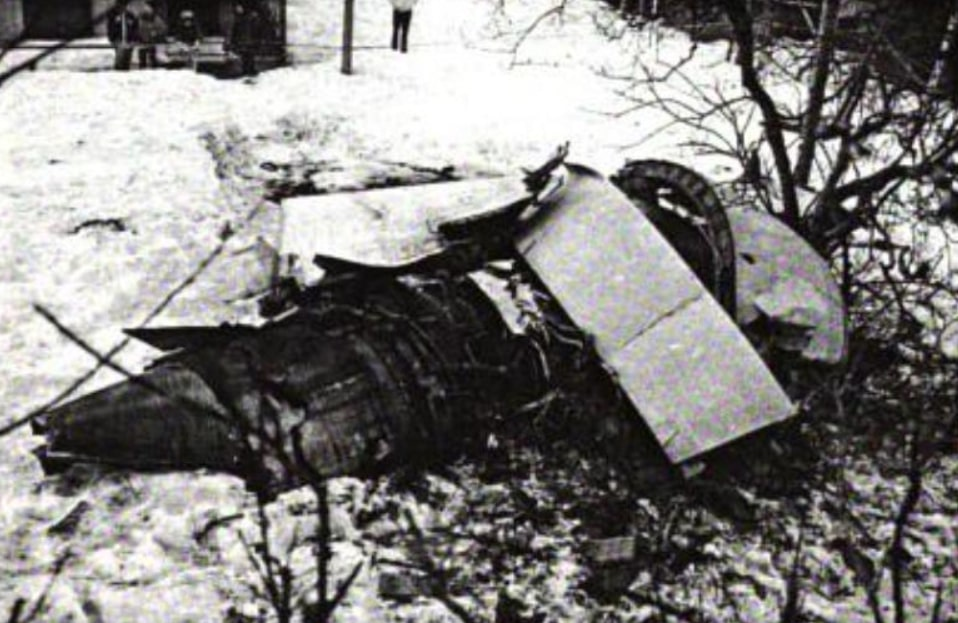
The engine after it fell in Anchorage, Alaska

While the desired airspeed was 183 knots (339 km/h; 211 mph), the airspeed fluctuated about 75 knots (139 km/h; 86 mph) from a high of 245 knots (454 km/h; 282 mph) to a low of 170 knots (310 km/h; 200 mph). Shortly thereafter, the flight crew reported a "huge" yaw, the No. 2 throttle slammed to its aft stop, the No. 2 reverser indication showed thrust reverser deployment, and the No. 2 engine electrical bus failed. Several witnesses on the ground reported that the airplane experienced several severe pitch and roll oscillations before the engine separated. Shortly after the engine separated from the airplane, the flight crew declared an emergency, and the captain initiated a large radius turn to the left to return and land on runway 06R. The No. 1 engine was maintained at emergency/maximum power. While on the downwind portion of the landing pattern, bank angles momentarily exceeded 48 degrees, alternating with wings level. At about 12:45, Flight 46E advised the tower that they were on the runway.

== Investigation ==
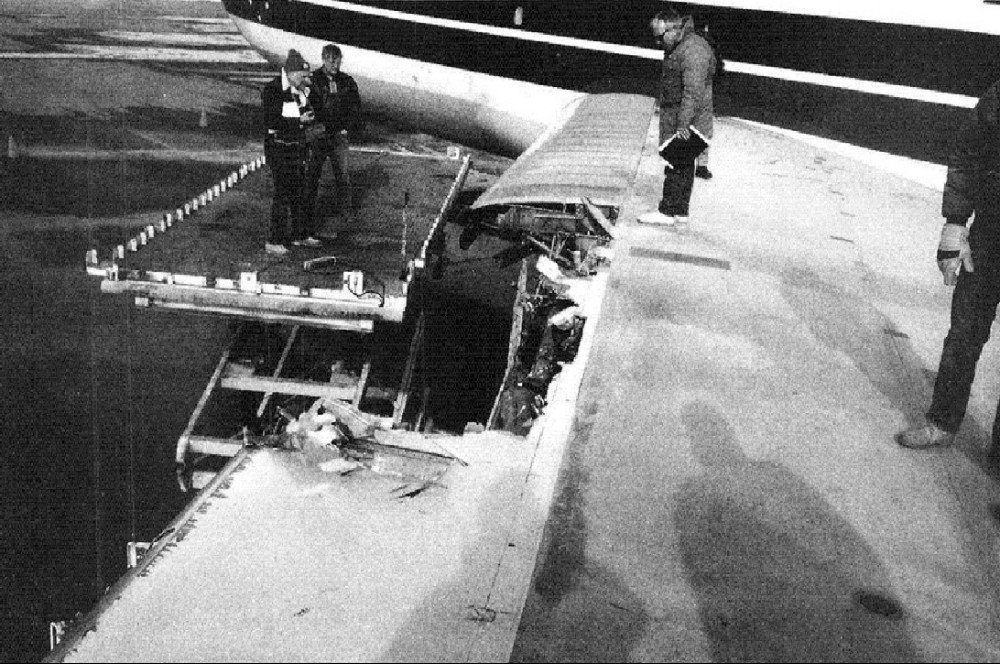
The damage to the port side

Investigators from the National Transportation Safety Board (NTSB) led the investigation. They discovered that there were multiple detachments of the pylon for engine two, which led to the subsequent detachment of the whole engine. Investigators discovered the direction of the detachment was outboard. It is likely the reason for the engine detachment was due to turbulence from the Alaskan Mountains the plane experienced as it climbed through 2,000 feet. The turbulence would have stressed the engine pylon. There was no sign of the same crack on other 747 pylons after Flight 46E's accident.

Prior to JAL46E's takeoff, another Evergreen 747 also operating for Japan Air Lines, JAL42E, also experienced minor damage. In response to the accident, the NTSB recommended that the FAA consider modifying the departure routes at Anchorage.

== Aftermath ==
N473EV was repaired and returned to service after the accident and kept flying for Evergreen International Airlines until 1998. The plane was scrapped in 2001.

== See also ==
- El Al Flight 1862 and China Airlines Flight 358 – Two other 747 freighters that encountered an engine detachment in the 1990s, both resulting in fatal crashes.
- Trans-Air Service Flight 671 – Another cargo flight that encountered turbulence resulting in an engine detachment.
- BOAC Flight 911 – An airliner that encountered extreme turbulence near Mount Fuji, resulting in all four engines and the empennage separating from the aircraft.
- Reeve Aleutian Airways Flight 8 – An accident involving a Lockheed L-188 Electra flying out of Cold Bay, AK to Seattle, WA. During the flight, the propeller of engine N.4 detached causing extensive damage to the aircraft prior to it making an emergency landing in Anchorage.
- American Airlines Flight 191 – Another case involving a detachment of an engine pylon at O'Hare International Airport in 1979.
- 1991 Gulf War Boeing KC-135 accident – A Boeing KC-135 Stratotanker that had an in-flight engine separation, but managed to make an emergency landing.
- UPS Airlines Flight 2976 - another engine pylon-related incident involving an MD-11F that crashed in Kentucky.
