= Omega Aerial Refueling Services Flight 70 =

2011 aviation accident

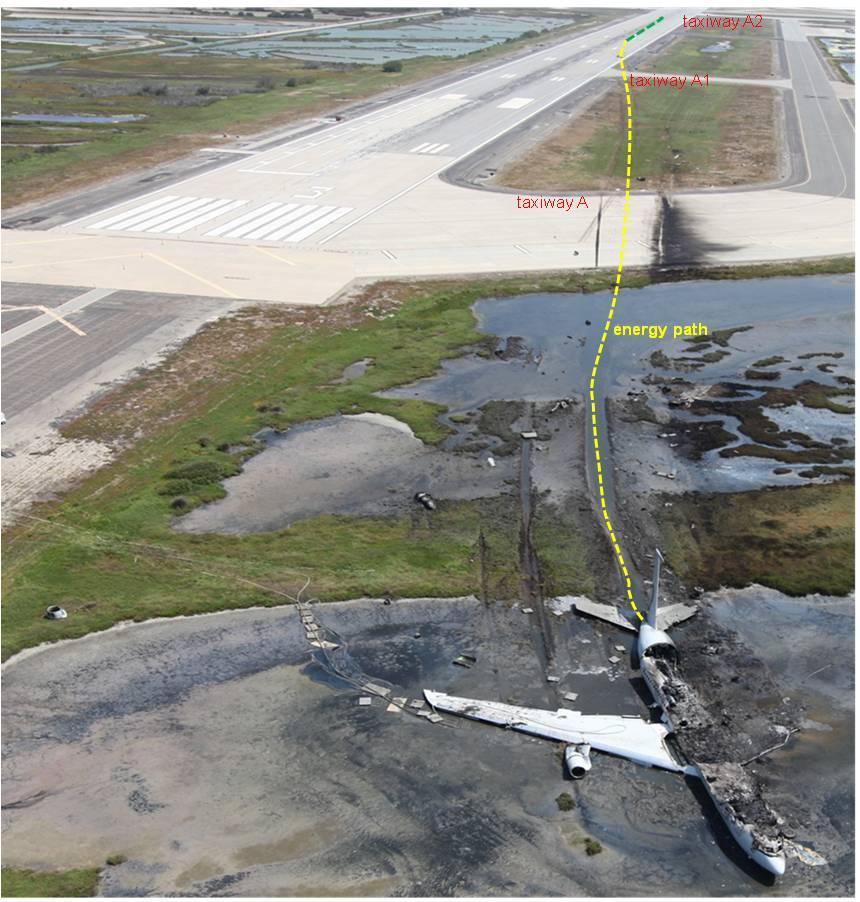
- The wreckage of Flight 70 laying in a saltwater marsh

Accident
- Date: May 18, 2011
- Summary: Runway excursion following engine separation
- Site: Naval Air Station Point Mugu, United States

Aircraft
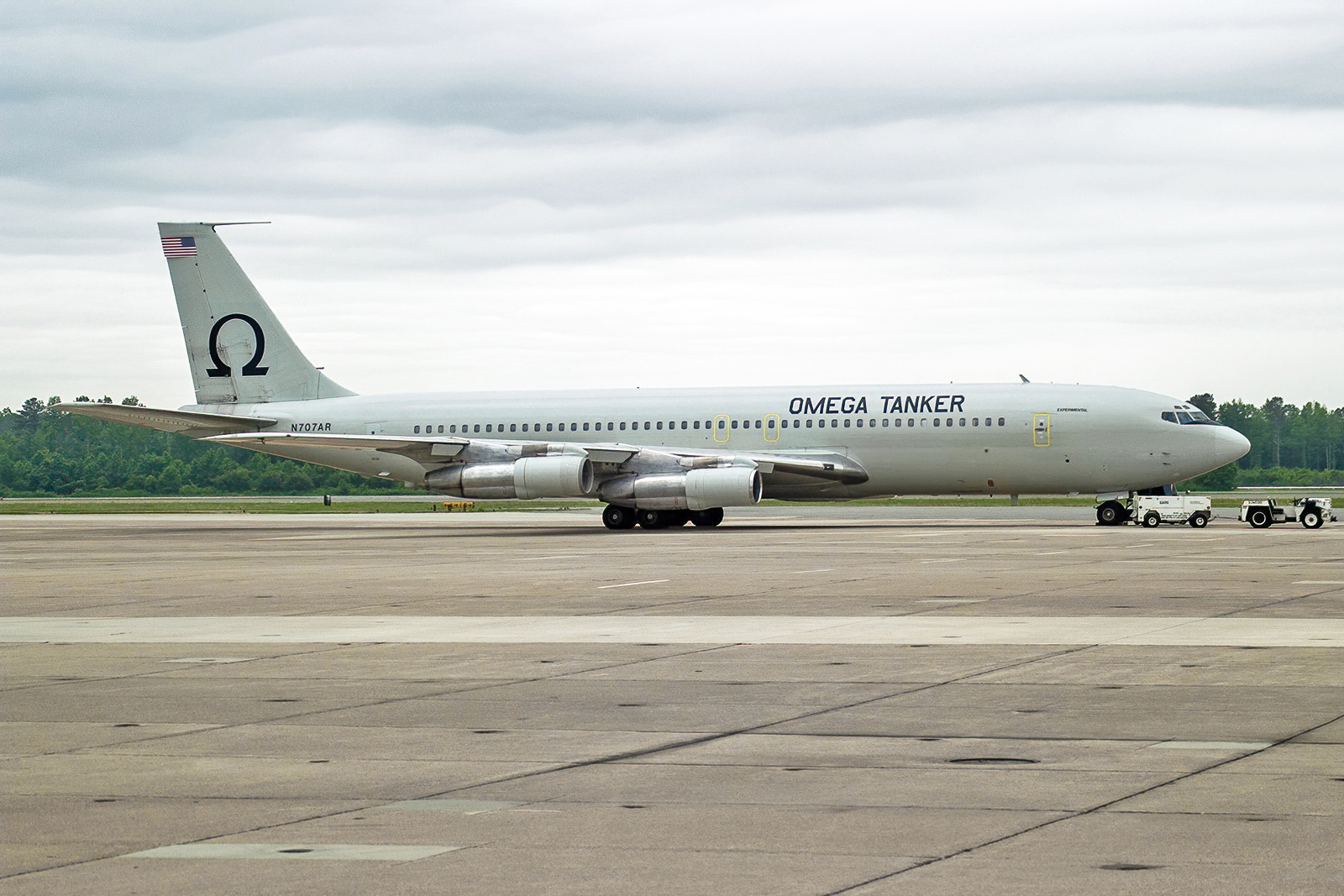
- N707AR, the aircraft involved in the accident, pictured in 2004
- Aircraft type: Boeing 707-321B
- Operator: Omega Aerial Refueling Services
- ICAO flight No.: OME70
- Registration: N707AR
- Flight origin: Naval Air Station Point Mugu, United States
- Destination: Naval Air Station Point Mugu, United States
- Occupants: 3
- Passengers: 0
- Crew: 3
- Fatalities: 0
- Injuries: 3
- Survivors: 3

Omega Aerial Refueling Services Flight 70 was a scheduled refueling flight operated by a Boeing 707 that, on May 18, 2011, crashed on takeoff from Naval Air Station Point Mugu, California, USA (now Naval Base Ventura County), while preparing to refuel McDonnell Douglas F/A-18 Hornets operated by the United States Navy that were in the nearby area. All three crew members on board survived the subsequent runway excursion with injuries.

== Background ==
Aircraft

The aircraft was a modified Boeing 707-321B. It was constructed in 1969, and, at the time of the accident, it had accumulated 47,856 flight hours, with 15,186 flight cycles. The aircraft was previously involved in an incident (under its previous registration N892PA) on February 20, 1969, where it overran the runway at Sydney Airport after the No. 2 engine suffered a bird strike during its takeoff roll. Omega Air acquired the aircraft on July 29, 1994, before which it was owned by five operators. In 1996 it was converted into a tanker.

Crew

41-year-old Captain Chris Thurmond had 5,117 flight hours, with 2,730 on the Boeing 707. He was hired by Omega Air in September 2008. At the time of the accident, he had type ratings for the Boeing 707 and 720, Beriev Be-200, and the Airbus A320. He was a former Navy pilot, and he flew on the B707 and E6A. He also flew the Beechcraft King Air in Europe, as well as the Airbus A320 for United Airlines (as a first officer). Additionally he flew flights with Principal Air’s B707s.

45-year-old First Officer Joseph Becker had 4,052 flight hours, with 2,900 on the Boeing 707. He was hired by Omega Air in October 2008. In the Navy, he flew the Raytheon T-1 Jayhawk, Boeing E6 Mercury and Beechcraft C-12 Huron. At Omega Air, he flew the DC-10 and the 707. He had type ratings on the Boeing 707 and 720, Beriev Be-200 and DC-10.

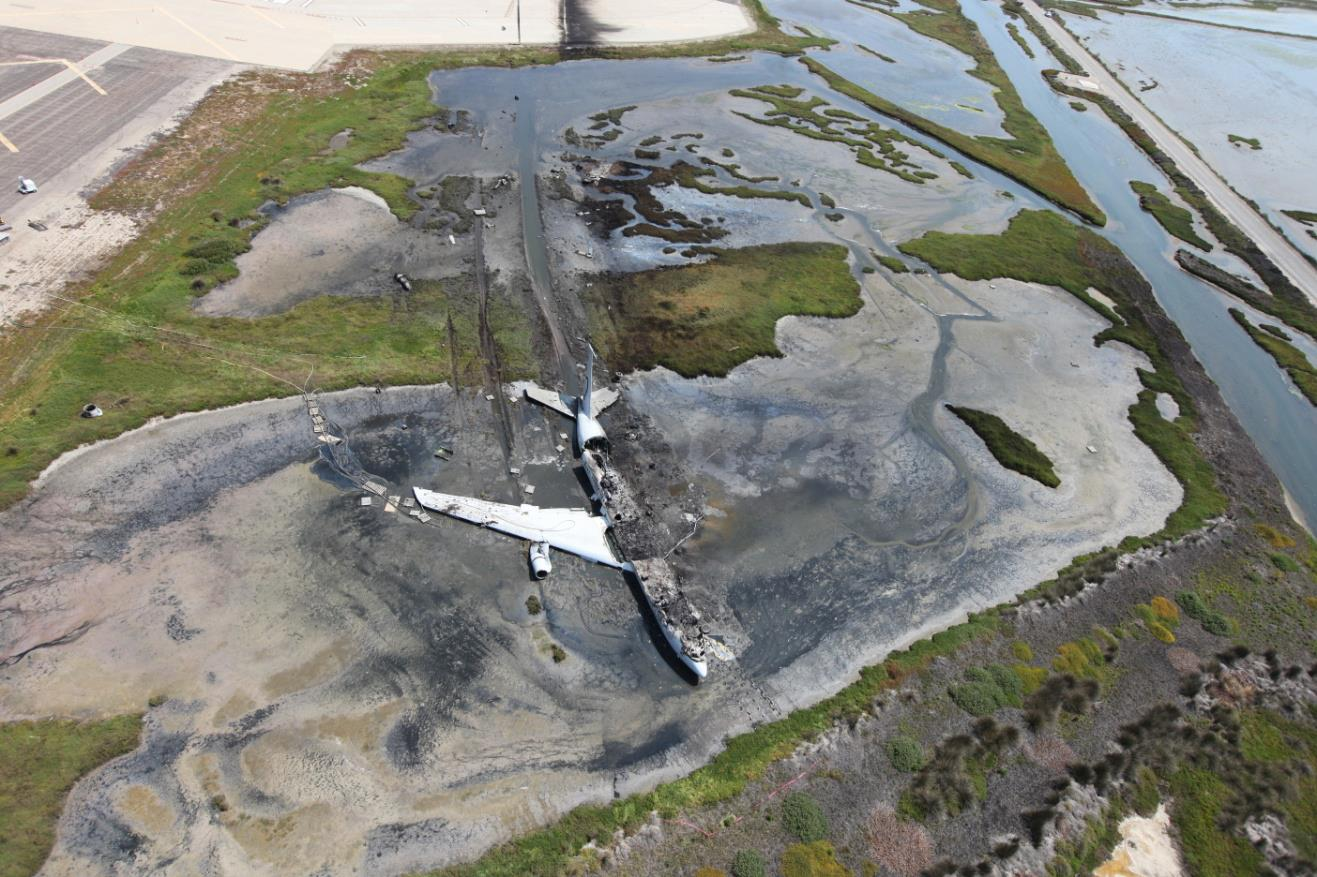
A full overview of the aircraft wreckage

50-year-old Flight Engineer Ken McNamara had around 9,000 flight hours, with 6,500 hours on the Boeing 707. He was hired by Omega Air in November 2002. In the US Air Force he flew the Lockheed C-141 Starlifter. He also flew the Boeing 707 and 747. He was qualified on the 707 and DC-10.

== Accident ==
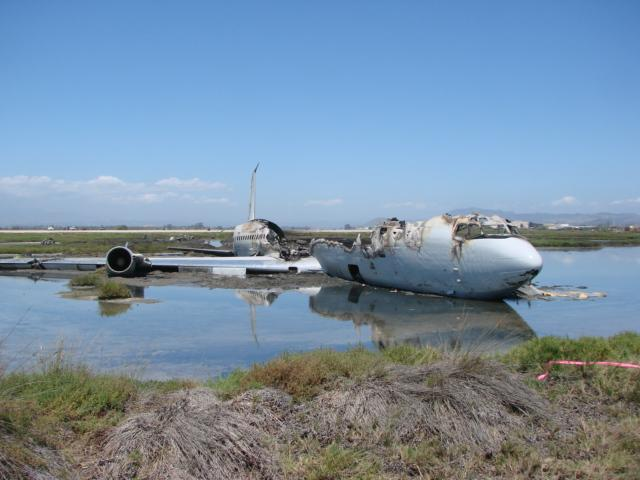
A ground view of the aircraft

The flight crew performed a pre-flight inspection and found nothing out of the ordinary. During taxi, winds were reported from 280° at 24 knots (28 mph; 44 km/h), gusting to 34 knots (39 mph; 63 km/h). The crew calculated the takeoff decision speed to be 141 knots (162 mph; 261 km/h), and the rotation speed to be 147 knots (169 mph; 272 km/h) which the pilots increased by 5 knots (5.8 mph; 9.3 km/h), to compensate for gusts. At 17:23 PDT the flight was cleared for take-off from runway 21 and the crew were instructed to turn left to 160° after departure. The take-off roll was normal and the plane lifted off the runway.

Shortly after liftoff, 20 feet (6.1 m) above and 7,000 feet (2,100 m) down the runway, the No. 2 engine separated from the wing and struck the No. 1 engine's inlet cowling, causing it to produce drag and reduced thrust. Even with full right aileron and rudder, the plane started to descend and drift to the left. The captain lowered the nose and leveled the wings, which was followed by the plane making multiple contacts with the runway. After touchdown, the plane drifted left and departed the runway, crossing a taxiway before coming to rest in a saltwater marsh. A fire erupted which consumed the top of the cabin and the cockpit. All three crew members survived.

== Investigation ==
=== Cracking issues ===
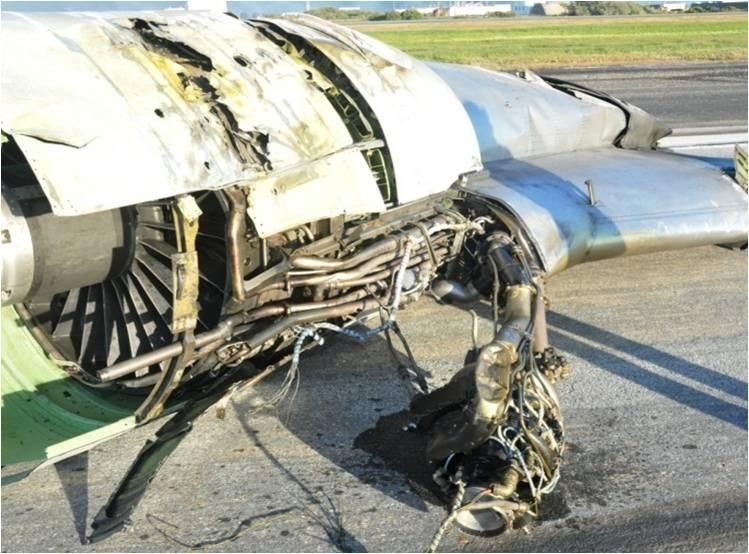
A closeup of No.2 engine laying on runway 21

The midspar fitting is of a right-angle configuration in which the vertical tang attaches to the pylon bulkhead and the horizontal upper and lower tangs sandwich the midspar of the pylon. The lug at the center of the fitting is attached to the forward drag support fitting on the underside of the wing. Fractures of the midspar fitting were observed at the upper and lower horizontal tangs at the radius, where the tangs merge with the lug at the fitting's center.

According to Boeing, there were 45 reported midspar fitting cracks, including 3 engine separations prior to the incident.

=== Service bulletins and airworthiness directives ===
Between 1975 and 1993 a series of Boeing service bulletins and FAA airworthiness directives were published to address the midspar cracks. These included initial inspections on the No. 2 and No. 3 engine midspar fittings, followed by repetitive visual inspections. When the fittings were eventually replaced with ones with larger radii in critical areas, the inspections were terminated. Nacelle droop stripes were also to be installed, which were supposed to indicate when a nacelle support structure is broken.

Omega conducted visual inspections from 1996 to 2003, when a records review found that the fittings were replaced by the plane's previous operator in 1983. Because of this they stopped the inspections, however post-crash inspection showed no such replacement took place. Because of this fatigue cracks were allowed to form in the inadequate old fittings.

=== Probable cause ===
The NTSB determined that the probable cause of this accident was:

The failure of a midspar fitting, which was susceptible to fatigue cracking and should have been replaced with a newer, more fatigue-resistant version of the fitting as required by an airworthiness directive. Also causal was an erroneous maintenance entry made by a previous aircraft owner, which incorrectly reflected that the newer fitting had been installed.

— National Transportation Safety Board

== See also ==
- Trans-Air Service Flight 671 - A similar incident involving the Boeing 707 in which the No. 3 engine impacted the No. 4 engine.
- El Al Flight 1862 - A similar accident involving the Boeing 747 in which the No. 3 engine impacted the No. 4 engine.
- China Airlines Flight 358 - A similar accident involving the Boeing 747 in which the No. 3 engine impacted the No. 4 engine.
- American Airlines Flight 191
