= De Boom Die Alles Zag =

Tree in Amsterdam, Netherlands

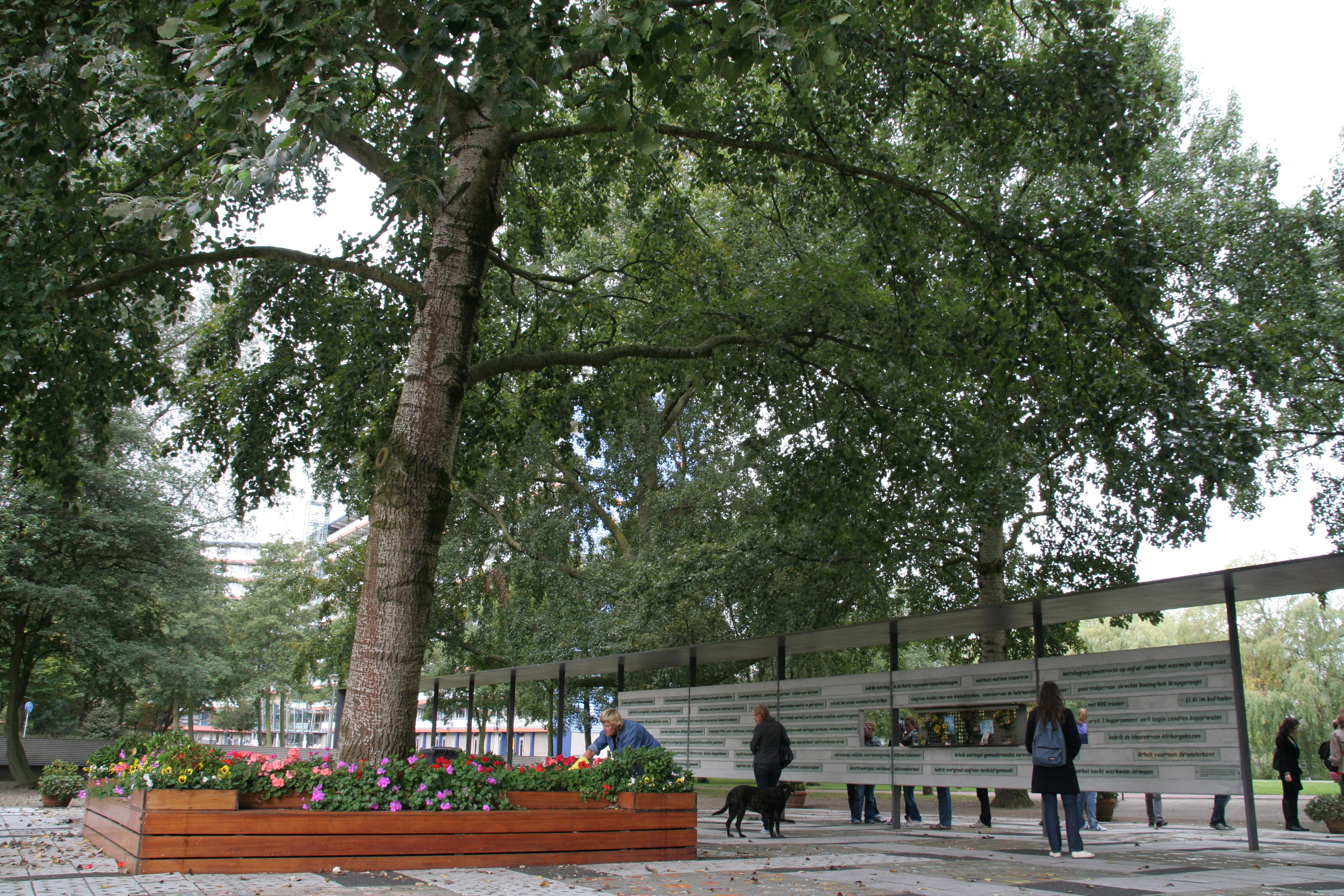
- De Boom Die Alles Zag and the monument next to it in 2009
- Species: Grey poplar (Populus × canescens)
- Location: Bijlmermeer, Amsterdam, Netherlands
- Coordinates: 52°19′08″N 4°58′27″E
- Date seeded: mid-20th century

De Boom Die Alles Zag (transl. The Tree That Saw It All) is a grey poplar (Populus × canescens) tree located in Bijlmermeer, Amsterdam, the Netherlands, that survived the crash of El Al Flight 1862 on 4 October 1992. Due to the eye-shaped patterns on its trunk, the tree was considered to be an eyewitness of the accident and its aftermath. An official memorial was built next to the tree, where the accident is commemorated every year on its anniversary. It is a part of a larger monument, Het Groeiend Monument (transl. The Growing Monument).

The tree lost a part of its roots during the clean-up of the soil, which made it necessary to support it with two cables attached to neighbouring trees. The soil under it was replaced in 2017 to stimulate root growth, which according to pulling tests four years later improved its condition, but the tree is still supported by the cables to prevent it from falling.

== History ==
De Boom Die Alles Zag is a grey poplar (Populus × canescens). The tree is located on the Nellesteinpad in Bijlmermeer and was planted during the early years of the neighbourhood (c. mid to late 1960s).

=== Crash of El Al Flight 1862 ===
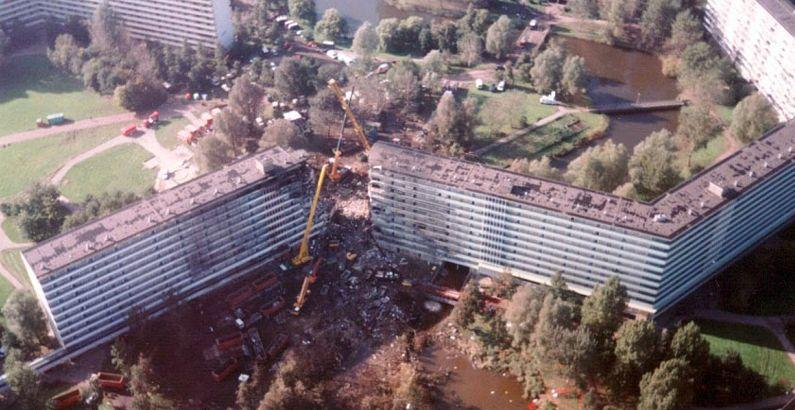
The aftermath of El Al Flight 1862, with the tree being located behind the destroyed buildings

On 4 October 1992, El Al Flight 1862, a cargo flight from Amsterdam Schiphol Airport (AMS/EHAM) to Tel Aviv Ben Gurion Airport (TLV/LLBG) operated by a Boeing 747-200 of El Al Israel Airlines, crashed into the flats at Bijlmermeer 15 minutes after takeoff due to two of its engines breaking off the wing mid-flight, damaging flight control surfaces. While the official death toll is at 43, the exact number of ground fatalities could not be determined accurately as the buildings housed many illegal immigrants. Another uncertainty is the cargo carried by the aircraft, which was not properly logged by the airline. A medical research by the Academic Medical Center concluded that a dozen cases of autoimmune disorders among the survivors could be directly attributed to the crash. Residents claimed that this was the result of undisclosed military cargo on board the flight.

De Boom Die Alles Zag was located next to the buildings into which the plane crashed, but managed to survive the impact and subsequent fire. As a result of the crash, the soil near the accident site was polluted by harmful substances and resulted in the removal of many trees. De Boom Die Alles Zag was kept at its place, but lost some parts of its roots during the sanitization process, which caused the tree to become crooked. Due to the eye-shaped patterns on the trunk, the grey poplar species is sometimes nicknamed the "ogenboom" (transl. eyetree) in The Netherlands. The tree in Bijlmermeer is hence considered to be an eyewitness to "the panic[,] upheaval [and] the aftermath in the years that followed [the crash]", comparable to The Survivor Tree and the Anne Frank tree.

=== Subsequent history ===
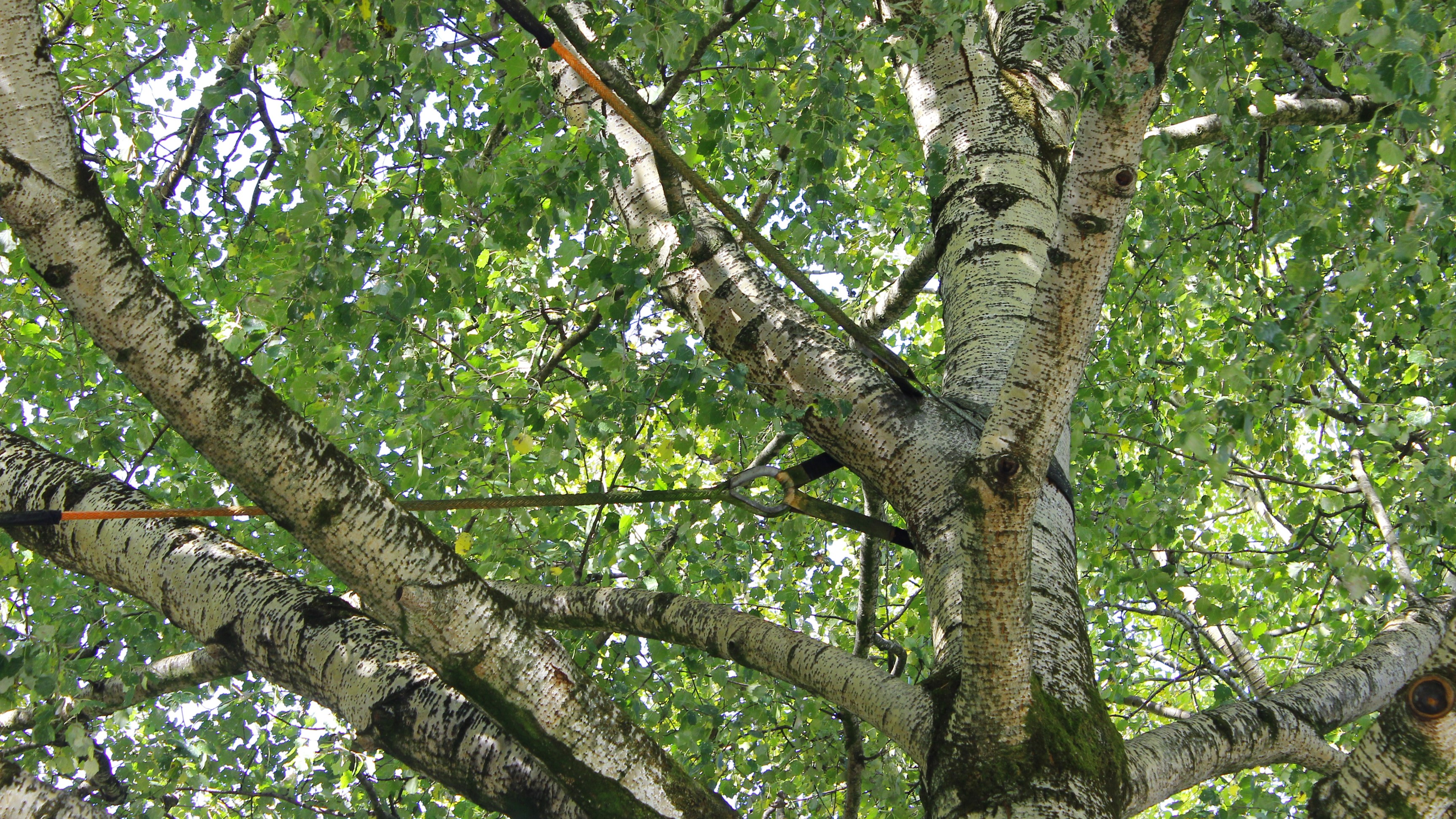
A close-up with the "eyes" and two cables visible

Following the accident, the soil under the tree was replaced with sand, where the roots were only able to recover to a limited extent. To prevent it from falling over, the tree was attached to neighbouring trees with two cables. In 2013, its crown was reduced in size after a pulling test showed that the tree was unstable. The sand was replaced with soil again in 2017 in an attempt to stimulate root growth. The Bijlmer Museum—which includes the tree—has been a "protected city view" since 2018. In 2020, it was reported that the tree had a parasitic fungus in the base of its trunk. Two further tests the following year where the tree was pulled with a force of 265 kilonewtons (60,000 lbf) showed that its condition had improved, but still was worse than ideal. As a result, the cables were loosened but not fully removed.

In February 2021, saplings from the tree were sent to a tree nursery in Glimmen, Groningen, at the request of the Municipality of Amsterdam, to secure its survival in the unlikely case it had to be cut down. It would take at least five years for the new trees to grow enough to be planted back in Amsterdam.

== Monument and legacy ==
Residents of Bijlmermeer and victims set up a temporary memorial place around the tree almost immediately after the disaster, and the tree has subsequently held emotional value for many of the people affected. A planter designed by artist Lucas van Herwaarden was built around the tree in 1992. An official monument by the Dutch Government was later constructed at the same place. The disaster is commemorated every year on its anniversary at the monument next to the tree. De Boom Die Alles Zag and its surroundings are a part of a larger monument dedicated to the crash called The Growing Monument (Dutch: Het Groeiend Monument) consisting of five monumental pieces to remember the accident, including mosaic tiles on the ground that surround the tree. The tree is "the heart of the monument".

A 2017 documentary about the disaster by Dutch TV programme Andere Tijden is named after the tree. On 28 August 2020, the tree was selected as the "Tree of the Year" of the province of North Holland, allowing it to compete in the national contest, where it finished in fourth place. In September 2022, the Municipality of Amsterdam listed it as the third most beautiful tree of the city.
