= Trans-Air Service Flight 671 =

1992 aviation accident over France

- A photograph taken by the first officer in the cockpit; shows the damage to the right wing

Accident
- Date: 31 March 1992
- Summary: In-flight separation of two engines due to metal fatigue
- Site: Séderon, Drôme, Auvergne-Rhône-Alpes, France

Aircraft
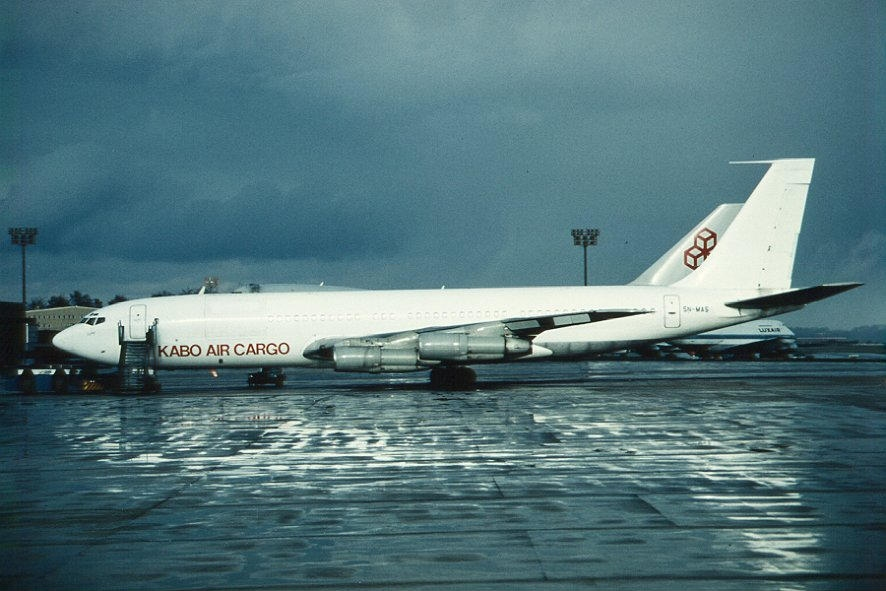
- 5N-MAS, the aircraft involved, pictured 3 days before the accident
- Aircraft type: Boeing 707-321C
- Operator: Trans-Air Service on behalf of Kabo Air
- IATA flight No.: N9671
- ICAO flight No.: QNK671
- Call sign: KABO 671
- Registration: 5N-MAS
- Flight origin: Luxembourg Airport
- Destination: Mallam Aminu Kano International Airport
- Occupants: 5
- Crew: 5
- Fatalities: 0
- Injuries: 0
- Survivors: 5

Trans-Air Service Flight 671 was a cargo flight from Luxembourg Airport to Mallam Aminu Kano International Airport in Kano, Nigeria. While flying over France on 31 March 1992, the Boeing 707 operating the flight experienced an in-flight separation of two engines on its right wing. Despite the damage to the aircraft, the pilots were able to perform an emergency landing on runway 33 at Istres-Le Tubé Air Base in Istres, France. All five occupants of the aircraft survived, but the aircraft was damaged beyond repair due to a fire on the right wing.

== Aircraft and crew ==
=== Aircraft ===
The aircraft was a 28-year-old Boeing 707-321C, serial number 18718. It had been manufactured in April 1964 and was first delivered to Pan Am at end of the month, with the registration number N794PA. During its tenure with Pan Am, it was initially named Clipper Undaunted, and was later renamed Clipper African Queen. It had accumulated 60,985 flight hours over 17,907 flights. It was powered by four Pratt & Whitney JT3D-3B engines. During its history, the aircraft's owner and registration had changed multiple times; at the time of the accident, it was registered 5N-MAS and operated for Nigerian operator Trans-Air Service.

=== Crew ===
The captain was 57-year-old Swedish national Ingemar Berglund; he had a total of approximately 26,000 hours of flying experience, including 7,100 on the Boeing 707. The first officer was 44-year-old British national Martin Emery; he had approximately 14,000 hours of flying experience, including 4,500 on the Boeing 707. The flight engineer was 55-year-old British national Terry Boone; he had approximately 18,000 hours of flying experience, all on the Boeing 707. A mechanic and a cargo supervisor were also on board the flight. The mechanic was 36-year-old Nigerian national Ike Nwabudike, and the cargo supervisor was 27-year-old Icelandic national Ingvar Einarsson.

Crew by nationality
Nationality	Crew
Sweden	1
United Kingdom	2
Nigeria	1
Iceland	1
Total	5

== Accident ==
The flight departed Luxembourg Airport at 07:14 UTC (9:14 am local time) on 31 March 1992; it was carrying 38 tonnes of freight and was destined for Mallam Aminu Kano International Airport near Kano, Nigeria. At approximately 08:11, while the aircraft was climbing through 32,000 feet (9,800 m) over the Drôme department in southeastern France, the crew noticed severe turbulence and heard a loud "double bang"; the aircraft subsequently began to roll to the right. Captain Berglund then disengaged the autopilot and used control column and rudder inputs to regain control of the aircraft. In addition, the fire warning was continuously audible and could not be switched off by the flight engineer. First Officer Emery observed that the number 4 engine (the right-most of the aircraft's four engines) had detached from the wing and sent out a mayday call. Emery then noticed that the number 3 engine (the inner engine on the right wing) had also detached from the wing. Captain Berglund started descending towards Marseille while Flight Engineer Boone began dumping fuel in preparation for an emergency landing.

During the descent, the crew noticed an airfield ahead; this was Istres-Le Tubé Air Base in Istres, France. The crew then decided to land on runway 15 at Istres; this required a left hand circuit prior to landing. This left turn proved to be very challenging for Captain Berglund given the damage to the aircraft's flight controls; the cockpit voice recorder showed that First Officer Emery was encouraging Berglund by repeating the words "left turn" six times. Shortly before landing, the air traffic controller observed a fire on the aircraft.

The aircraft made an emergency landing at Istres at 08:35 (10:35 am local time), approximately 24 minutes after the initial engine separation. During the landing roll, the aircraft ran off the left side of the runway. After the aircraft came to a stop, the crew noticed that there was a fire on the aircraft's right wing. All five occupants of the aircraft survived without any injuries; nonetheless, there was considerable fire damage to the right wing. The aircraft was damaged beyond repair.

== Investigation ==
Following the incident, engines number 3 and 4 were located near Séderon, Drôme. Investigators found that metal fatigue had caused a crack to develop in the pylon that held the number 3 engine (the right inboard engine) to the wing. This weakened the pylon such that it broke on the accident flight, leading to separation of the number 3 engine. As it detached from the wing, the separated number 3 engine struck the number 4 engine, causing it to separate as well. In addition, an airworthiness directive that required periodic inspections of the pylons was found to be ineffective in detecting such fatigue cracks.

== Aftermath ==
In response to the accident, the French BEA (Bureau of Enquiry and Analysis for Civil Aviation Safety) recommended modification to the inspection procedures for engine pylons so that fatigue cracks could be detected more easily. The BEA also recommended that air traffic controllers receive regular training for emergency situations by theoretical study and by performing practical exercises.

The year after the incident, the crew received the Hugh Gordon-Burge Memorial Award from the Honourable Company of Air Pilots.

== In popular culture ==
The events of Trans-Air Service Flight 671 were featured in the 2022 episode "Double Trouble", of the Canadian documentary TV series Mayday.

== See also ==
Other incidents involving engine or propeller separation:

- Omega Aerial Refueling Services Flight 70 - another Boeing 707 accident caused by an engine separating and striking the other engine on the same wing
- American Airlines Flight 191 - engine separation on takeoff and subsequent crash
- El Al Flight 1862 and China Airlines Flight 358 - two other instances of in-flight engine separations resulting in fatal crashes
- Reeve Aleutian Airways Flight 8 - in-flight propeller separation that damaged flight controls, but the aircraft was able to safely make an emergency landing
- Japan Air Lines Cargo Flight 46E - in-flight engine separation, but the crew was able to make an emergency landing
- 1991 Gulf War Boeing KC-135 accident - a close relative of the Boeing 707 that had an in-flight engine separation, but managed to make an emergency landing. The in-flight engine separation was attributed to wake turbulence from a passing KC-135.
- UPS Airlines Flight 2976 - engine separation on takeoff and subsequent crash
