= Séderon =

- Commune
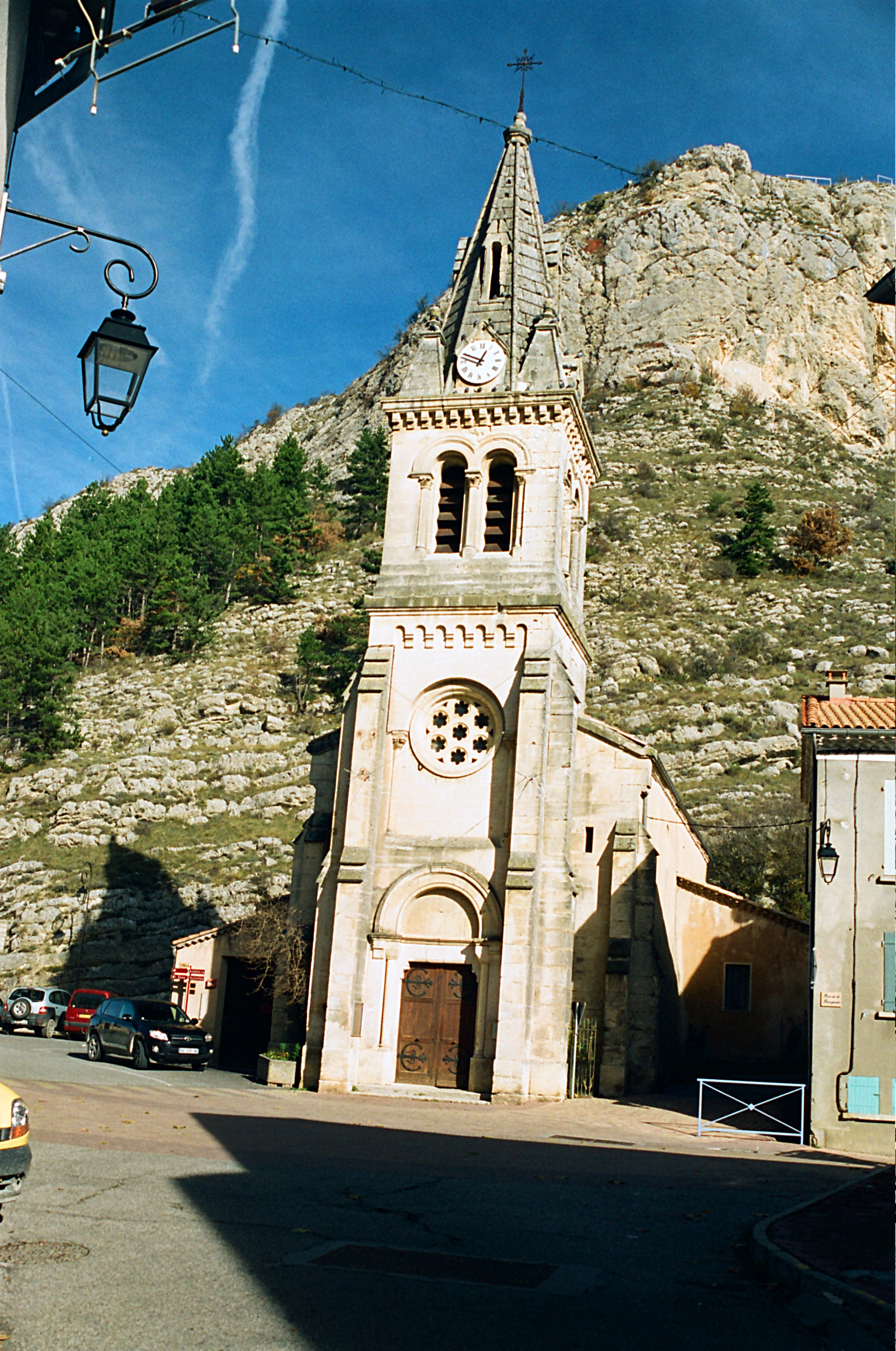
- Sainte-Baudile Church in Séderon

- Coat of arms
- Location of Séderon
- Location within France Location within Auvergne-Rhône-Alpes
- Coordinates: 44°12′18″N 5°32′16″E
- Country: France
- Region: Auvergne-Rhône-Alpes
- Department: Drôme
- Arrondissement: Nyons
- Canton: Nyons et Baronnies

Government
  - Mayor (2020–2026): Alain Frachinous
- Area^{1}: 20.30 km^{2} (7.84 sq mi)
- Elevation: 810 m (2,660 ft)
- Highest elevation: 1,484 m (4,869 ft)
- Lowest elevation: 751 m (2,464 ft)
- Population (2023): 237
  - Density: 11.7/km^{2} (30.2/sq mi)
- Time zone: UTC+01:00 (CET)
  - Summer (DST): UTC+02:00 (CEST)
- INSEE/Postal code: 26340 /26560
- ^{1} French Land Register data, which excludes lakes, ponds, glaciers > 1 km^{2} (0.386 sq mi or 247 acres) and river estuaries.

Séderon (French pronunciation: [sedʁɔ̃]; Occitan: Sederon) is a commune in the Drôme department in southeastern France.

== History ==
In March 1992 engines number 3 and 4 of Trans-Air Service Flight 671 detached from the aircraft and fell to the ground near Séderon.

== Population ==
Historical population
Year	Pop.	±% p.a.
1968	363	—
1975	321	−1.74%
1982	296	−1.15%
1990	245	−2.34%
1999	286	+1.73%
2007	291	+0.22%
2012	282	−0.63%
2017	264	−1.31%
2023	237	−1.78%
Source: INSEE

== See also ==
- Communes of the Drôme department
