= Omega Aerial Refueling Services =

American aviation defense contractor

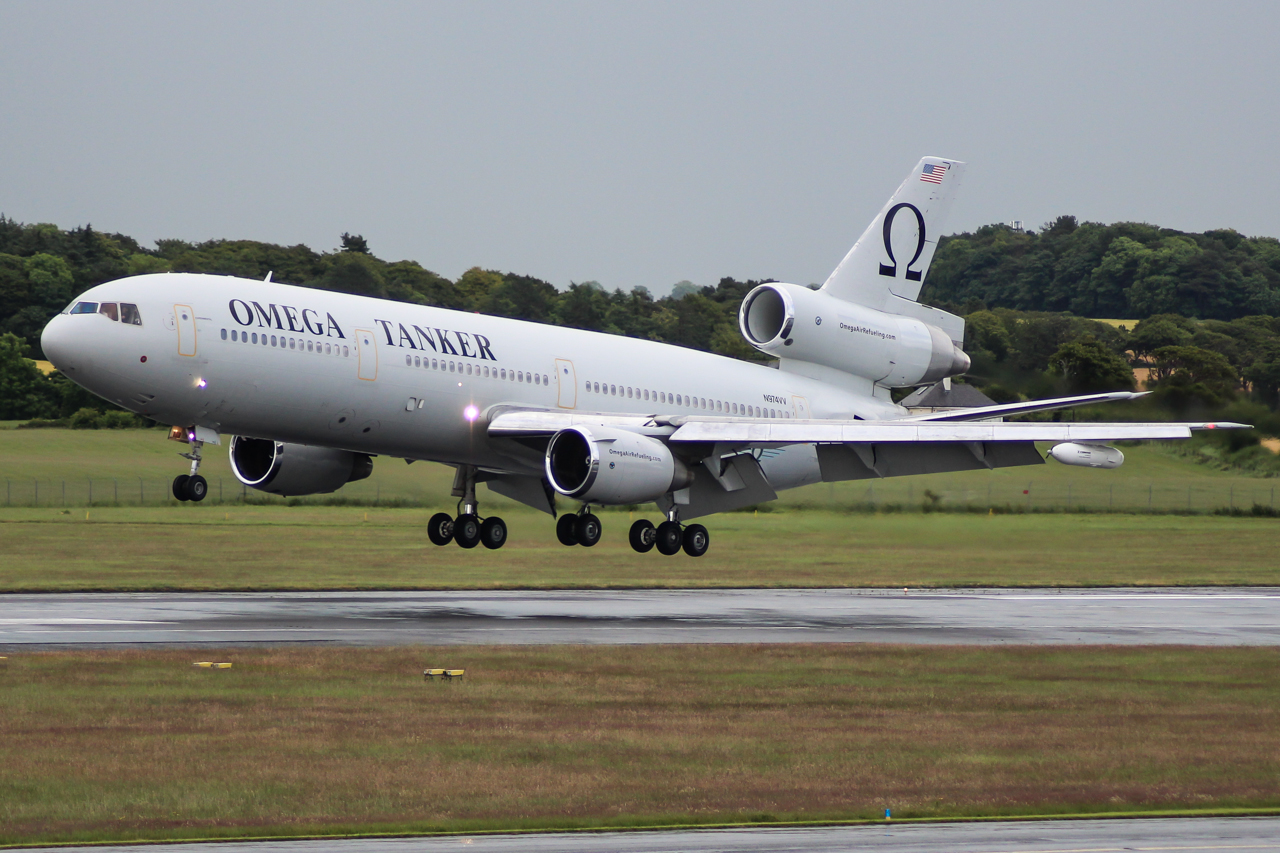
- An Omega Air KDC-10 landing at Glasgow Prestwick Airport in July 2016
IATA	ICAO	Call sign
-	OME	OMEGA TANKER
- Founded: 1999
- Commenced operations: 2000
- Operating bases: San Antonio International Airport
- Fleet size: 5
- Headquarters: San Antonio, Texas, US
- Website: omegaairrefueling.com

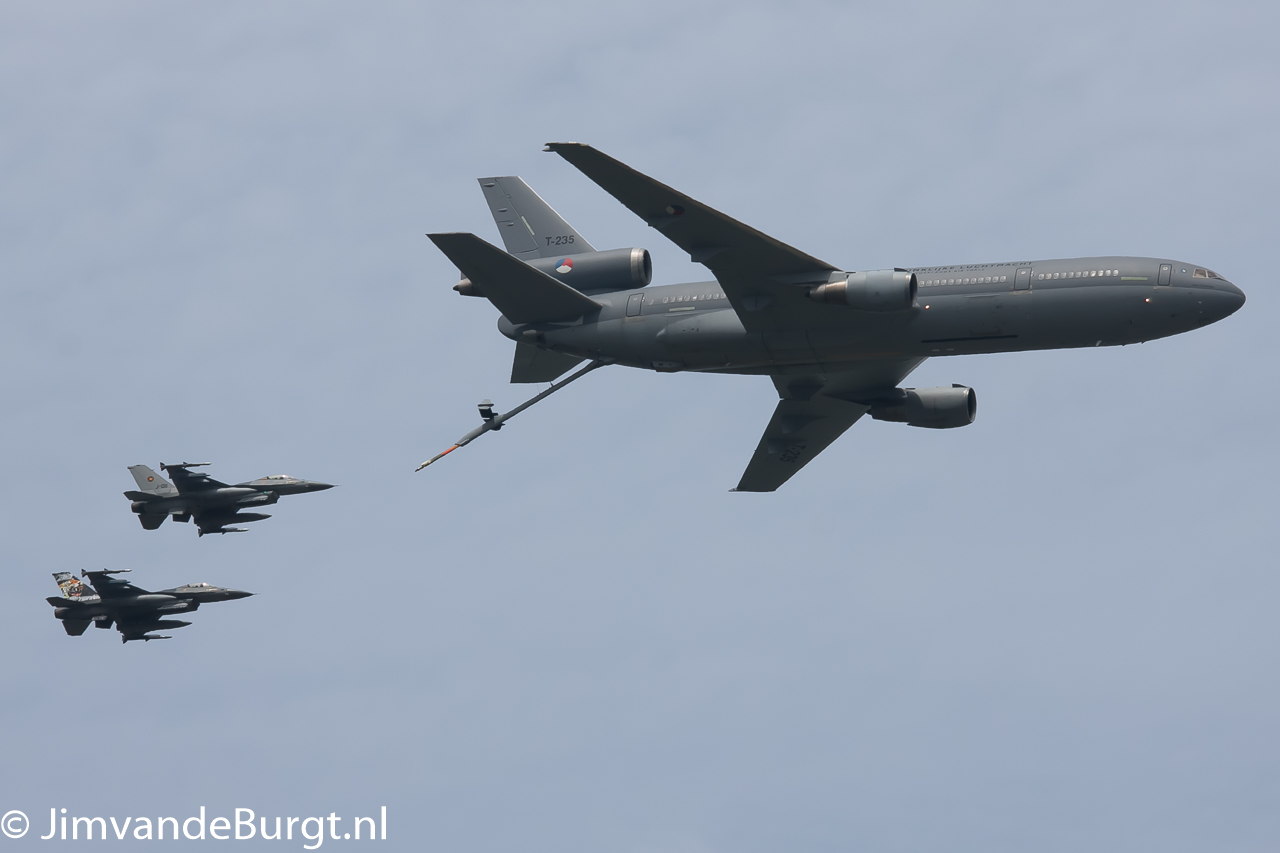
An McDonnell Douglas KDC-10-30 of the Netherlands air force in refuelling a pair of F-16 Fighting Falcon in June 2013. This aircraft was later purchased by omega.

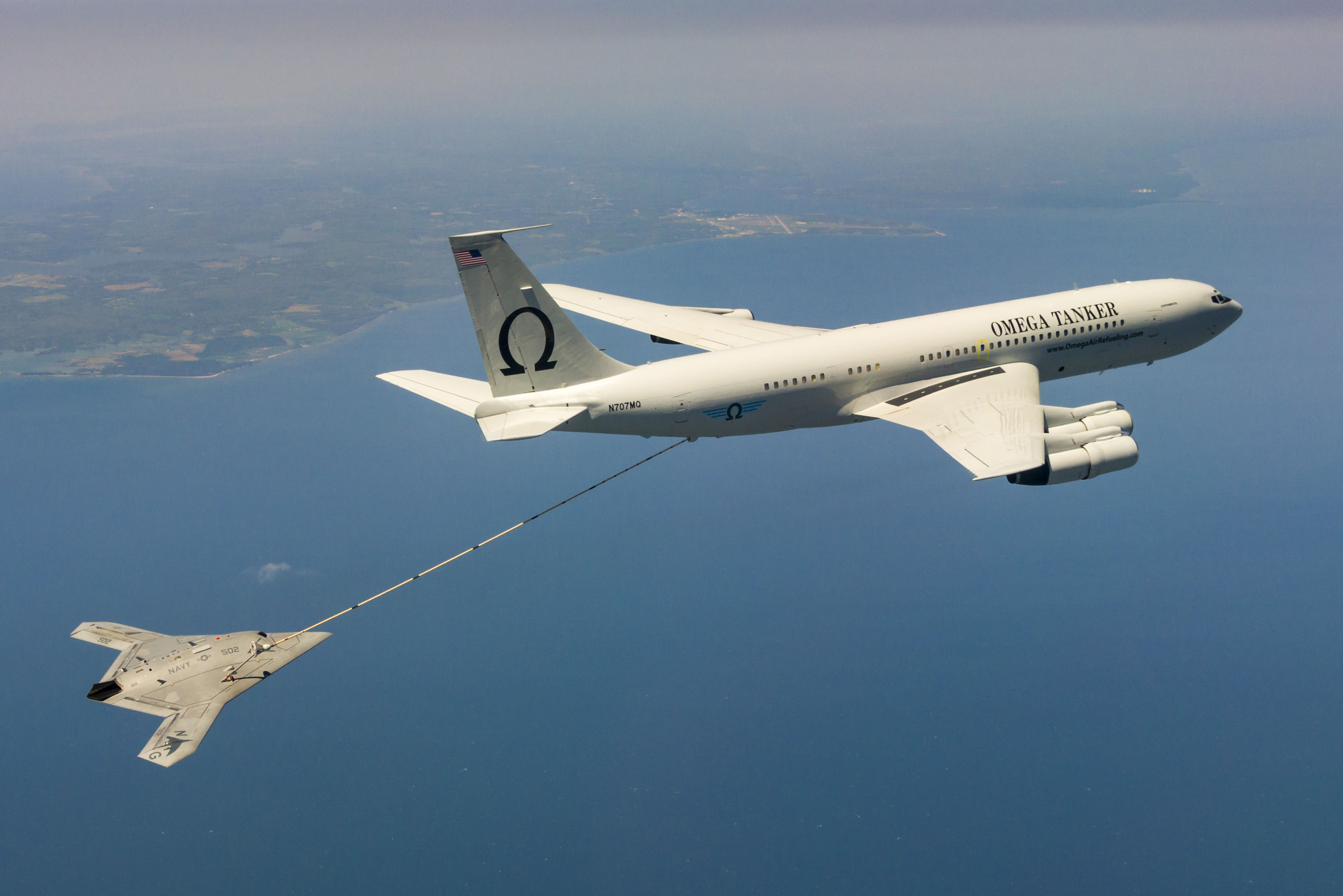
An Omega Boeing KC-707 (N707MQ) refuelling a Northrop Grumman X-47B in April 2015

Omega Aerial Refueling Services Incorporated is an American aviation company that provides aerial refueling services for military customers.

== History ==
Omega developed the first commercial aerial refueling aircraft in 1999 and has provided aerial refueling services under contract to the United States Navy since 2001. The company has also been engaged to support Royal Australian Air Force training exercises due to delays in delivery of KC-30A tankers. In addition, Omega Air Refueling states it has been contracted to support deployments by the Royal Air Force and the Royal Canadian Air Force.

In October 2011, the company took delivery of three additional Boeing 707-338Cs from the Royal Australian Air Force.

On April 22, 2015, one of Omega's KC-707s refueled a Northrop Grumman X-47B. The US Navy told the media this was the first time an unmanned aerial vehicle had been refueled in flight.

In November 2019, it was announced that two KDC-10 Tankers from the Royal Netherlands Air Force would be acquired, and as such additional capacity would be added, including 'boom capability' in addition to the existing 'hose and drogue' of the existing fleet. The aircraft were bought in 1995 by the RNLAF from Martinair as civilian DC-10 passenger airliners. The planes were converted to tanker aircraft. Because the planes were getting older and the RNLAF bought two A330 MRTT from Airbus, they sold their older tankers to Omega Air Refueling.

The first of the two tankers that were sold, T-264 Prins Bernard, departed on Monday, November 4, 2019, from Eindhoven Air Base in the Netherlands.

== Fleet ==
As of October 2026, Omega Aerial Refueling Services operates the following aircraft:

Omega Aerial Refueling Services fleet
Aircraft	In service	Orders	Notes
Boeing KC-707-338C	2	—	N707MQ, N707GF
McDonnell Douglas KC-10A Extender	—	10	Not yet in service
McDonnell Douglas KDC-10-30	2	—	N235UL, N264DE
McDonnell Douglas KDC-10-40	1	—	N974VV; Last flying PW-engined DC-10
Total	5	10	

Omega currently operates two converted Boeing KC-707-338Cs (N707MQ and N707GF) and three converted McDonnell Douglas KDC-10s (N974VV, N235UL, N264DE).

== Accidents and incidents ==
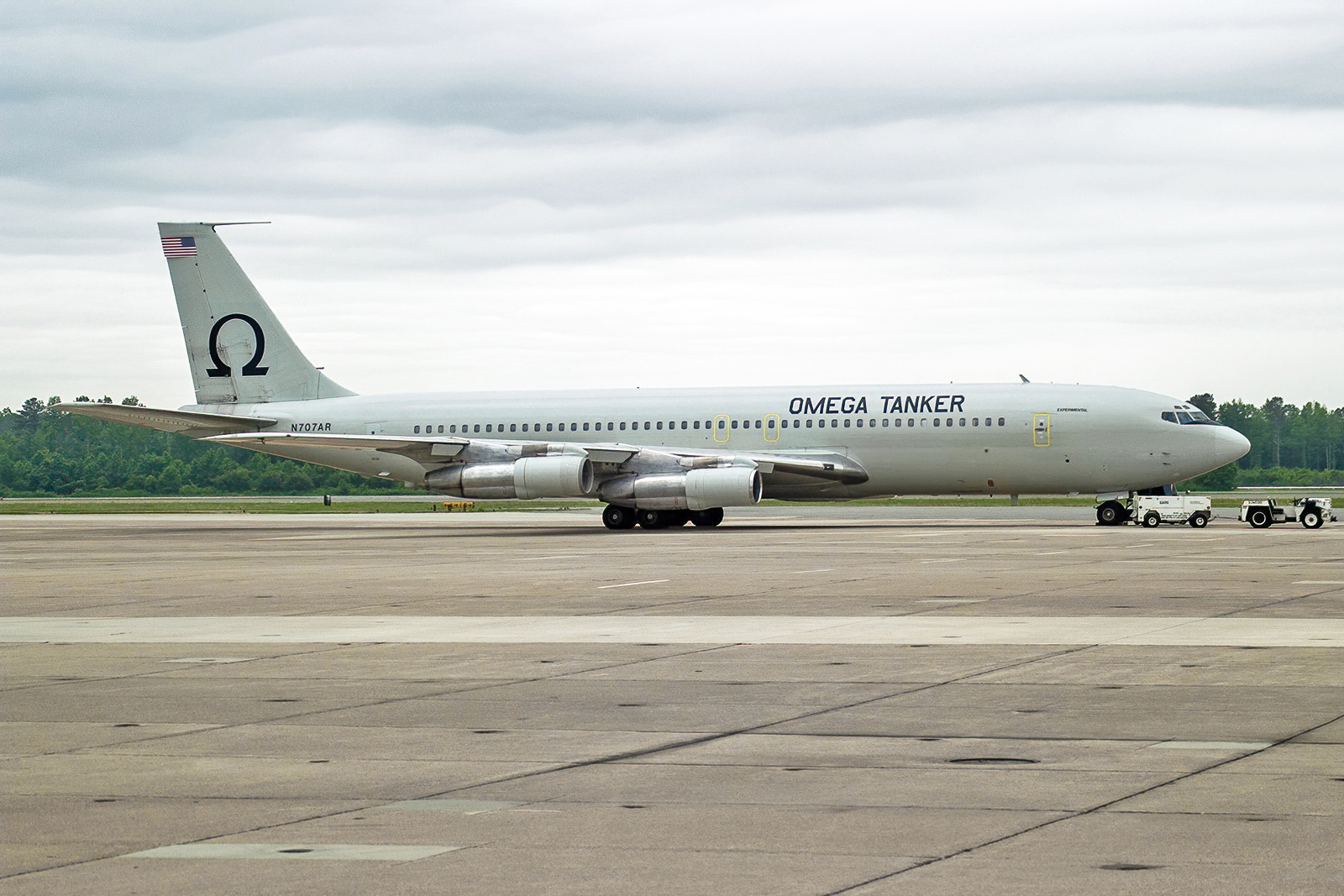
The aircraft involved is a Boeing KC-707 (N707AR).

- On May 18, 2011, Omega Aerial Refueling Services Flight 70, a Boeing KC-707 tanker (registered as N707AR) was destroyed after it crashed on takeoff from Naval Base Ventura County in California. All three crew members survived.

== See also ==
- Metrea
