= 1991 Gulf War Boeing KC-135 accident =

1991 aviation accident over Saudi Arabia

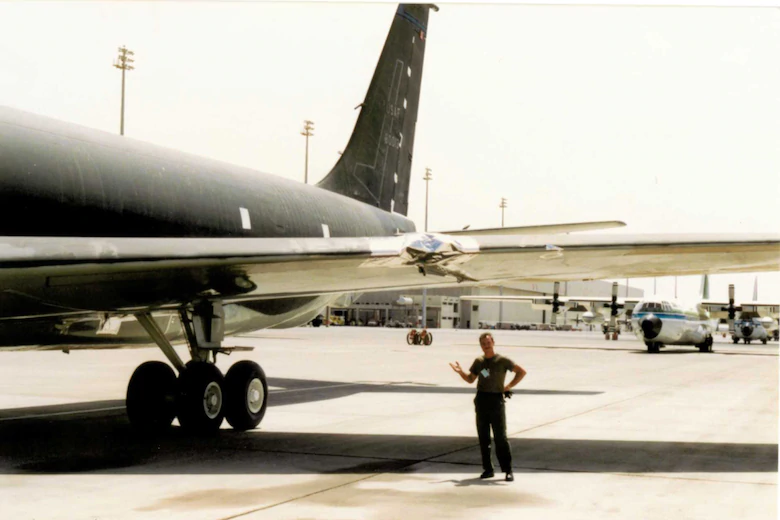
- The damage to the aircraft

Accident
- Date: 6 February 1991
- Summary: Dual engine separation due to wake turbulence; subsequent emergency landing
- Site: Near Jeddah, Saudi Arabia

Aircraft
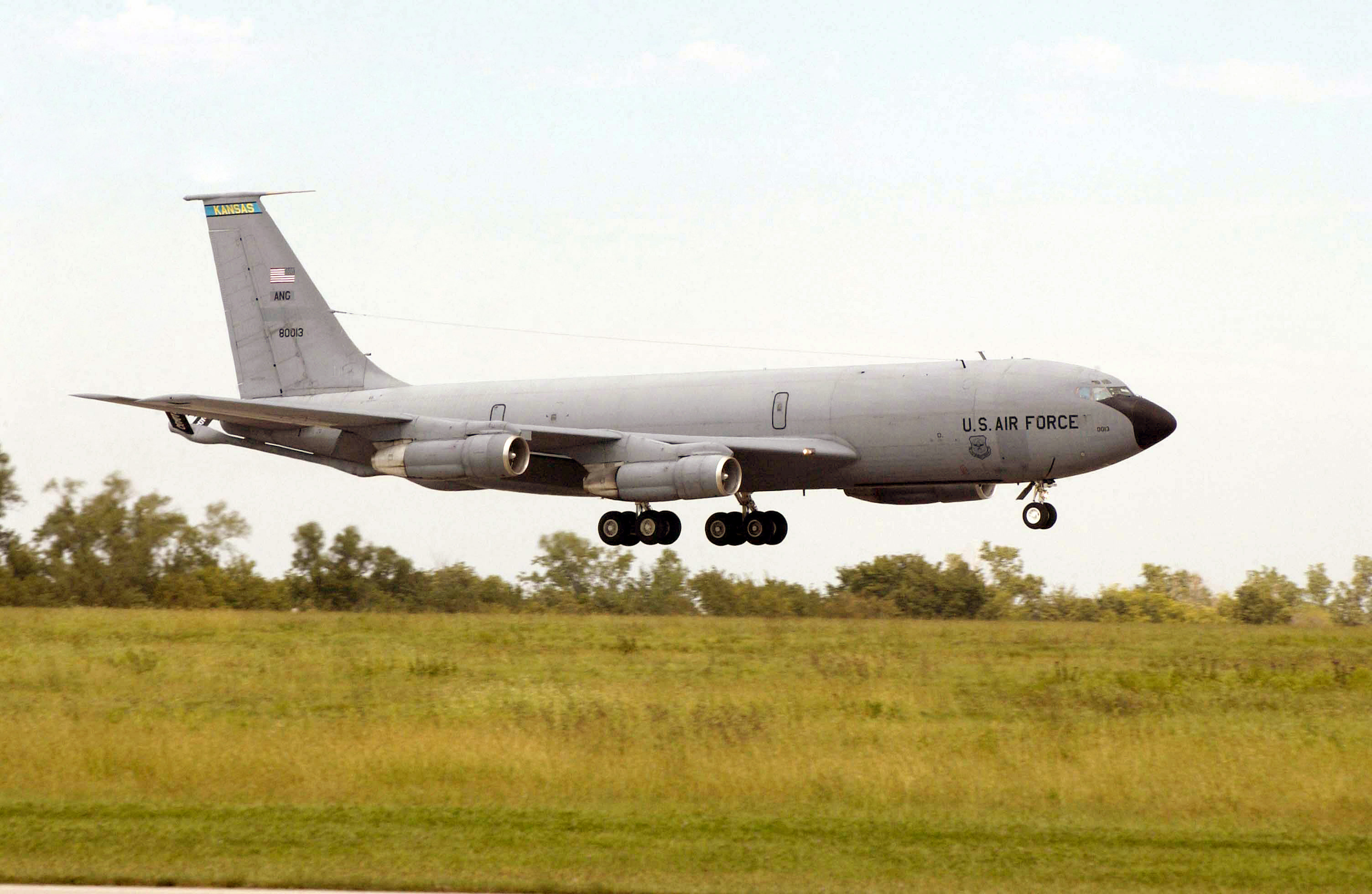
- 58-0013, the aircraft involved in the accident, seen in 2004 with a newer livery
- Aircraft type: Boeing KC-135E Stratotanker
- Operator: United States Air Force
- Call sign: WHALE 05
- Registration: 58-0013
- Flight origin: Prince Abdullah Air Base, Jeddah, Saudi Arabia
- Destination: Prince Abdullah Air Base, Jeddah, Saudi Arabia
- Occupants: 4
- Crew: 4
- Fatalities: 0
- Survivors: 4

On 6 February 1991, a Boeing KC-135 of the United States Air Force (USAF) operated by the 190th Air Refueling Wing took off from Prince Abdullah Air Base, Jeddah, Saudi Arabia, en route to a Gulf War refueling mission. The aircraft carried a crew of four. While in-flight, the aircraft lost engines one and two, both left-wing engines, while flying over the Saudi Arabian desert. To counteract the plane's descent, the pilots began dumping fuel. During the landing in Jeddah, due to the damage of the engine's hydraulic system, most of the descent was performed without autopilot. The aircraft landed safely at Jeddah.

== Background ==
=== Aircraft ===
The aircraft involved was a Boeing KC-135E, manufactured by Boeing in 1959 with serial number 17758. It was powered by four Pratt & Whitney TF33-PW-102 engines.

=== Crew ===
The crew consisted of:

- Aircraft Commander Lieutenant Colonel Kevin Sweeney
- Pilot Jay Selanders
- Navigator Greg Mermis
- Boom Operator Steve Stucky

== Accident ==
WHALE 05 was scheduled for take off from Jeddah at 17:24 local time and climbed to 25,000 feet (7,600 m) to perform an aerial refueling. Another Boeing KC-135 took off at around the same time and was supposed to fly the same route. The co-pilot of the second aircraft ascended to the planned altitude of 25,000 feet (7,600 m). After reaching the target altitude, autopilot was engaged with the aircraft about one nautical mile behind the other KC-135.

Approximately 45 minutes after takeoff, WHALE 05 encountered forward wake turbulence and suddenly banked more than 110 degrees to the left, and within a few seconds it banked more than 110 degrees to the right. The captain activated the speed brakes and restored the aircraft to a near level attitude. During the sequence of events, both left wing engines detached from the aircraft. After recovery, fire alarms on the two left side engines activated. The captain ordered the boom operator to look at the engines, who reported that there was no fire but that the engines were physically gone. As the aircraft had only been airborne for a short time, it still held almost 31,000 gallons of fuel. In addition, the hydraulic reception, fuel pumps, and landing gear were damaged when the engines detached, and fuel was spilling from the left wing.

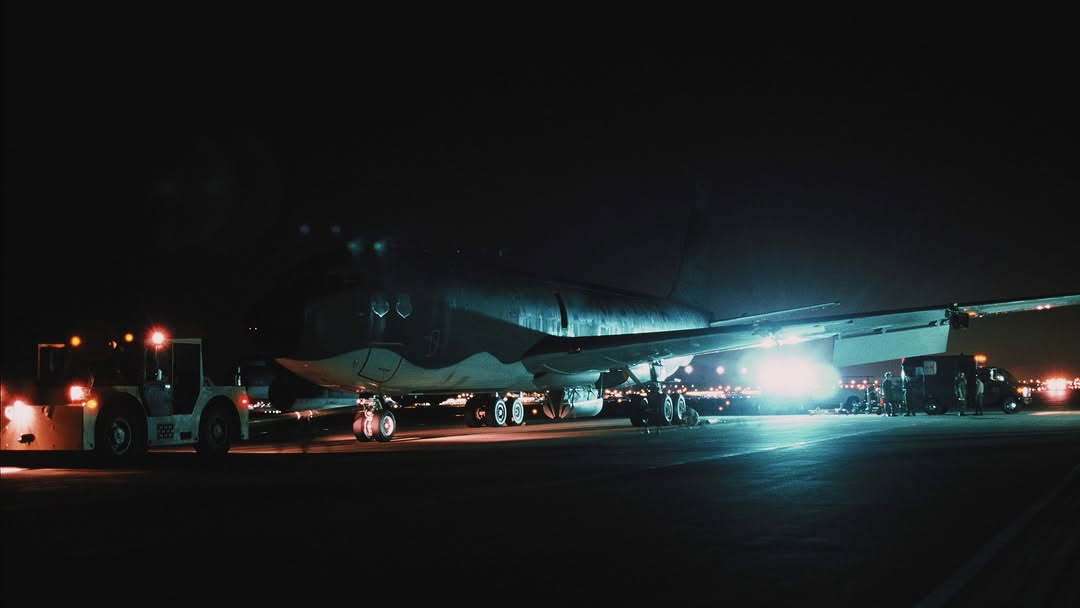
The aircraft involved, seen here after the emergency landing

To maintain altitude and the speed of fuel discharge, the captain declared "Mayday" and decided to return to Jeddah. The aircraft returned to level flight at 16,000 feet (4,900 m). The aircraft arrived at Prince Abdullah Air Base an hour and fifteen minutes later. Since the hydraulic system had been damaged, the landing gear was deployed manually. The pilots requested to land on runway 34L because it was the longest runway and had an instrument landing system (ILS) approach. During the landing, the pilot deployed the thrust reverser on the number three engine, but immediately discontinued its use due to difficulty in directional control. Although several tires were damaged, the aircraft came to a stop at about 300 m (1,000 ft) from the end of the runway. The entire crew of WHALE 05 were awarded the Distinguished Flying Cross.

== Dramatization ==
The accident was featured in the seventh episode of the twenty-first season of the Canadian show Mayday: Air Disasters, titled "Mission Disaster."

== See also ==
- Trans-Air Service Flight 671 – A Boeing 707 that suffered a dual engine separation on 31 March 1992, landing safely, a year after this accident.
- China Airlines Flight 358 – On 29 December 1991, this Boeing 747 experienced a dual engine separation, killing all five crew members, in the same year of this accident.
- El Al Flight 1862 – On 4 October 1992, 47 people were killed when the flight suffered a dual engine separation, leading to a loss of control and accident, killing all 4 crew and 43 people on the ground.
