= El Al Flight 1862 =

1992 aircraft accident in the Netherlands

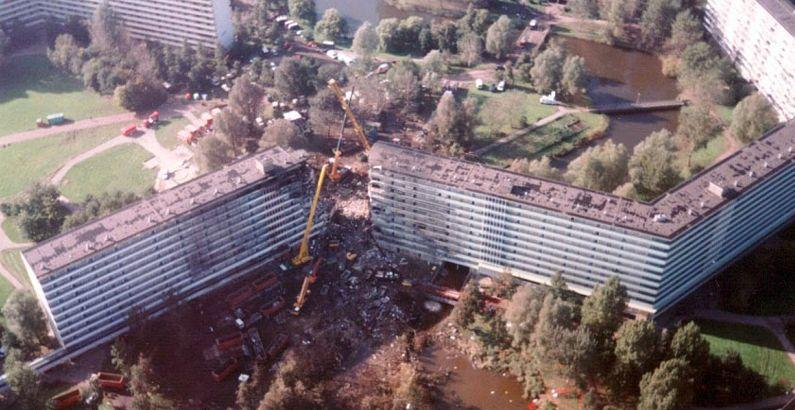
- The damage to the Bijlmermeer

Accident
- Date: 4 October 1992
- Summary: Crashed following dual engine separation and loss of control
- Site: Bijlmermeer, Amsterdam-Zuidoost Near Amsterdam Schiphol Airport, Netherlands; 52°19′8″N 4°58′30″E
- Total fatalities: 47
- Total injuries: 26

Aircraft
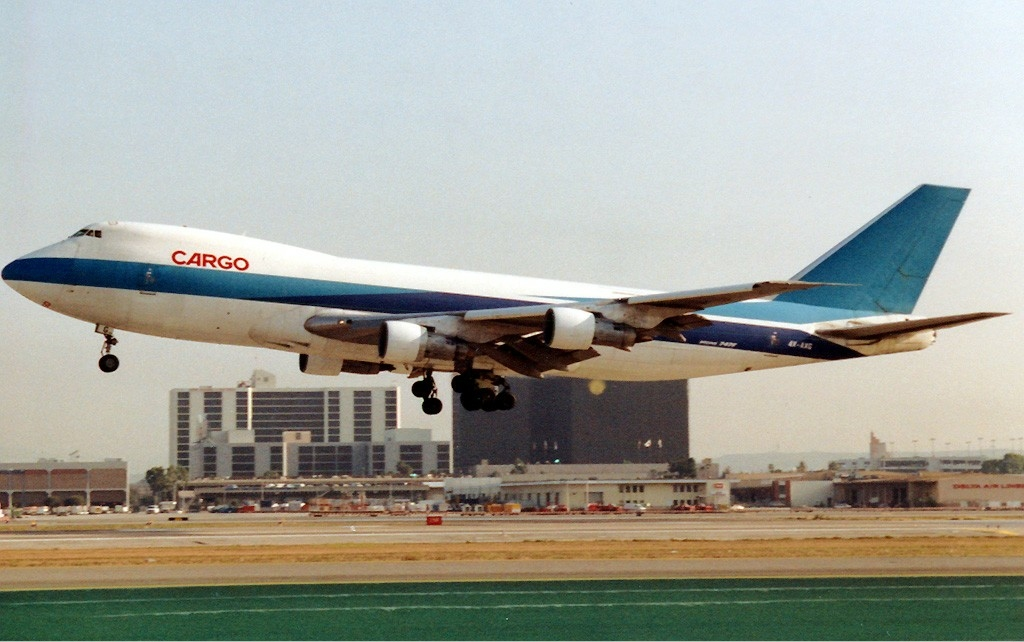
- 4X-AXG, the aircraft involved in the accident, seen in August 1992
- Aircraft type: Boeing 747-258F
- Operator: El Al
- IATA flight No.: LY1862
- ICAO flight No.: ELY1862
- Call sign: ELAL 1862
- Registration: 4X-AXG
- Flight origin: John F. Kennedy International Airport, New York, United States
- Stopover: Amsterdam Schiphol Airport, Netherlands
- Destination: Ben Gurion International Airport, Tel Aviv, Israel
- Occupants: 4
- Passengers: 1
- Crew: 3
- Fatalities: 4
- Survivors: 0

Ground casualties
- Ground fatalities: 43
- Ground injuries: 26

On 4 October 1992, El Al Flight 1862, a Boeing 747-200 cargo aircraft of the Israeli airline El Al, crashed into the Groeneveen and Klein-Kruitberg flats in the Bijlmermeer (colloquially "Bijlmer") neighbourhood of Amsterdam, Netherlands. The accident is known in Dutch as the Bijlmerramp ("Bijlmer disaster").

Forty-seven people are known to have been killed, including all 4 on board and 43 on the ground. The exact number killed on the ground is uncertain, as the building housed many unregistered residents. Eleven people were seriously injured and 15 received minor injuries. The accident is the deadliest aviation disaster to have occurred in the Netherlands.

== Aircraft ==
The aircraft involved was a Boeing 747-258F, MSN 21737, registered as 4X-AXG manufactured on 7 March 1979. At the time of the crash, the 13-year old aircraft still had at least 5 years of useful service before retirement. It had flown 45,746 hours and completed 10,107 flight cycles. It was equipped with four Pratt & Whitney JT9D-7J engines.

== Accident ==
On 4 October 1992, the cargo aircraft, a Boeing 747-258F, (Note: The aircraft was a Boeing 747-200F (for Freighter) model; Boeing used to assign a unique customer code for each company that buys one of its aircraft, which was applied as a suffix in the model number at the time the aircraft is built. The code for El Al is "58", hence "747-258F".) registered as 4X-AXG, travelling from John F. Kennedy International Airport in New York to Ben Gurion International Airport in Israel, made a stopover at Amsterdam Schiphol Airport. During the flight from New York to Schiphol, three issues were noted: fluctuations in the autopilot speed regulation, problems with a radio, and fluctuations in the voltage of the electrical generator on engine number three, the inboard engine on the right wing that would later detach from the aircraft and initiate the accident.

The jet landed in Schiphol at 14:40 for cargo loading and crew change. The aircraft was refuelled and the observed issues were repaired, at least provisionally. The crew consisted of Captain Yitzhak Fuchs (59), First Officer Arnon Ohad (32), and Flight Engineer Gedalya Sofer (61). A single passenger named Anat Solomon (23) was on board. She was an El Al employee based in Amsterdam, and was travelling to Tel Aviv to marry another El Al employee. Captain Fuchs was an experienced aviator, having flown as a fighter-bomber pilot in the Israeli Air Force in the late 1950s. He had over 25,000 flight hours, including 9,500 hours on the Boeing 747. First Officer Ohad had less experience than the other two crew members, having logged 4,288 flight hours, 612 of them on the Boeing 747. Flight Engineer Sofer was the most experienced crew member on the flight, with more than 26,000 hours of flight experience, of which 15,000 were on the Boeing 747.

Captain Fuchs had flown for El Al for 28 years (since 1964) and had previously served in the Israeli Air Force for 10 years. First Officer Ohad had flown for El Al for 10 years (since 1982), and Flight Engineer Sofer for 37 years (since 1955).

=== Flight ===
El Al Flight 1862 was scheduled to depart at 17:30, but was delayed until 18:20. It departed from runway 01L Zwanenburgbaan (now known as runway 36C) on a northerly heading at 18:22. Once airborne, the aircraft turned to the right. Soon after the turn, at 18:27, above the Gooimeer, a lake near Amsterdam, witnesses on the ground heard a sharp bang and saw falling debris, a trail of smoke, and a momentary flash of fire on the right wing while the aircraft was climbing through 1,950 m (6,400 ft). The No. 3 (inner right) engine separated from the right wing of the aircraft, shot forward, damaged the wing slats, then fell back and struck the No. 4 (outer right) engine, tearing it from the wing. The two engines fell away from the aircraft, also ripping out a 10 m (33 ft) stretch of the wing's leading edge. The loud noise attracted the attention of some pleasure boaters on the Gooimeer. The boaters notified the Netherlands Coastguard of two objects they had seen falling from the sky. One boater, a police officer, said he initially thought the two falling objects were parachutists, but as they fell closer he could see that they were plane engines.

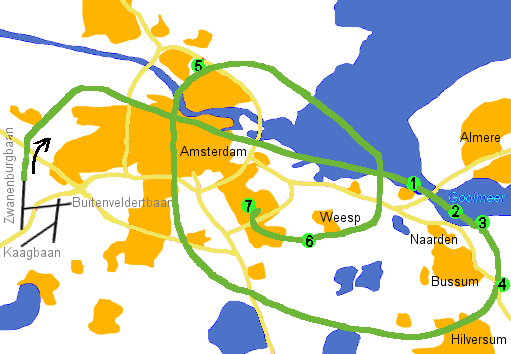
A map of Amsterdam showing the aircraft's flight path marked in green: 1. Engine nos. 3 and 4 break off; 2. Engine nos. 3 and 4 come down; 3. First mayday broadcast by pilot; 4. Pilot reports fire in the engine; 5. Pilot reports problems with the flaps; 6. Aircraft becomes totally uncontrollable; 7. Aircraft crashes

The first officer made a Mayday call to air traffic control (ATC) and indicated that they wanted to return to Schiphol. (Note: Initially, the first officer was the pilot flying while the captain was making calls to ATC. These roles were immediately swapped following the engine separation.) At 18:28:45, the first officer reported: "El Al 1862, lost number three and number four engine, number three and number four engine." ATC and the flight crew had not yet grasped the severity of the situation. Although the flight crew knew they had lost power from the engines, they had not realized that the engines themselves had completely broken off and that the wing had been damaged. (Note: In aviation, the term "lost" in this context means "engine failure", referring to an engine ceasing to provide thrust, rather than physically separating from the aircraft.) Later the media asked if the pilots could have been aware of the engines having broken off. After tests, it was found that the outboard engine on the wing of a 747 is visible from the cockpit only with difficulty and the inboard engine on the wing is not visible at all (and this is in clear weather; given the time of year and day, it was also getting dark, hampering visibility even further). Given the choices the captain and crew made following the loss of engine power, the Dutch parliamentary inquiry commission that later studied the crash concluded that the crew did not know that both engines had broken away from the right wing.

On the evening of the crash, the landing runway in use at Schiphol was runway 06 (called the Kaagbaan; the airport's standard runway for night-time operations due to lower noise impact on the ground). In this specific instance, it was also positioned favourably against the wind coming from direction 040 degrees. However, the crew requested runway 27 for an emergency landing, even though it meant landing with a 21-knot (11 m/s; 39 km/h; 24 mph) quartering tailwind. (Note: The wind was initially from 40 degrees at 21 knots (10.8 m/s; 38.9 km/h; 24.2 mph), and then 50 at 22 knots (11.3 m/s; 40.7 km/h; 25.3 mph). Runway 27 is aligned due west.)

The aircraft was still too high and too close to land when it first circled back to the airport. It was forced to continue circling Amsterdam to reduce its altitude to that required for a final approach to landing. During the second circle, the wing flaps were extended. The inboard trailing edge flaps extended (since they were powered by the number one hydraulic system, which was still functioning), but the outboard trailing edge flaps did not (since they were powered by the number four hydraulic system, which had failed when the number four engine broke away). The leading edge slats extended on the left wing, but not on the right wing, because of the extensive damage sustained when the engines separated, which had also severely disrupted the air flow over the right wing. That differential configuration caused the left wing to generate significantly more lift than the right, especially when the pitch altitude increased as the airspeed decreased, increasing the aircraft's tendency to roll further to the right, both because the right outboard aileron was inoperative and because the thrust of the left engines was increased in an attempt to reduce the aircraft's very high sink rate. As the aircraft slowed, the ability of the remaining controls to counteract the right roll diminished. The crew finally lost almost all ability to prevent the aircraft from rolling to the right. The roll reached 90° just before the impact with the apartments.

At 18:35:25, the first officer radioed to ATC: "Going down, 1862, going down, going down, copied, going down." In the background, the captain was heard instructing the first officer in Hebrew to raise the flaps and lower the landing gear.

=== Crash ===
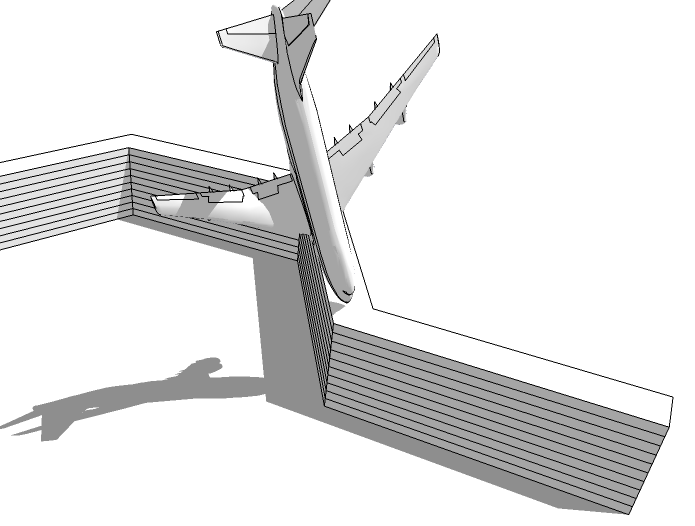
The aircraft's likely position at the point of impact

The crash location (plane icon) within the neighbourhood as it stood in 2007 (grey designates demolished buildings)

At 18:35:42 local time, the aircraft nose-dived from the sky and crashed into two high-rise apartment complexes in the Bijlmermeer neighbourhood of Amsterdam, at the corner of a building where the Groeneveen complex met the Klein-Kruitberg complex. It exploded in a fireball, which caused the building to partially collapse inward, destroying dozens of apartments. The cockpit came to rest east of the building, between the building and the viaduct of Amsterdam Metro Line 53; the tail broke off and was blown back by the force of the explosion.

During the last moments of the flight, the ATCs made several desperate attempts to contact the aircraft. The Schiphol arrival controllers work from a closed building at Schiphol-East, not from the control tower. At 18:35:45, the control tower reported to the arrival controllers: "Het is gebeurd" (literally "It has happened", but colloquially "It is over"). At that moment a large smoke plume emanating from the crash scene was visible from the control tower. The aircraft had disappeared from arrival control radar. The arrival controllers reported that the aircraft had last been located 1.5 km (0.9 mi; 0.8 nmi) west of Weesp, and emergency personnel were sent immediately.

At the time of the crash, two police officers were in Bijlmermeer checking on a burglary report. They saw the aircraft plummet and immediately sounded an alarm. The first fire trucks and rescue services arrived within a few minutes of the crash. Nearby hospitals were advised to prepare for hundreds of casualties as authorities were unsure if it was a cargo or passenger 747. The complex was partly inhabited by immigrants from Suriname and Aruba, both former Dutch colonies, and the death toll was difficult to estimate in the hours after the crash.

=== Aftermath ===
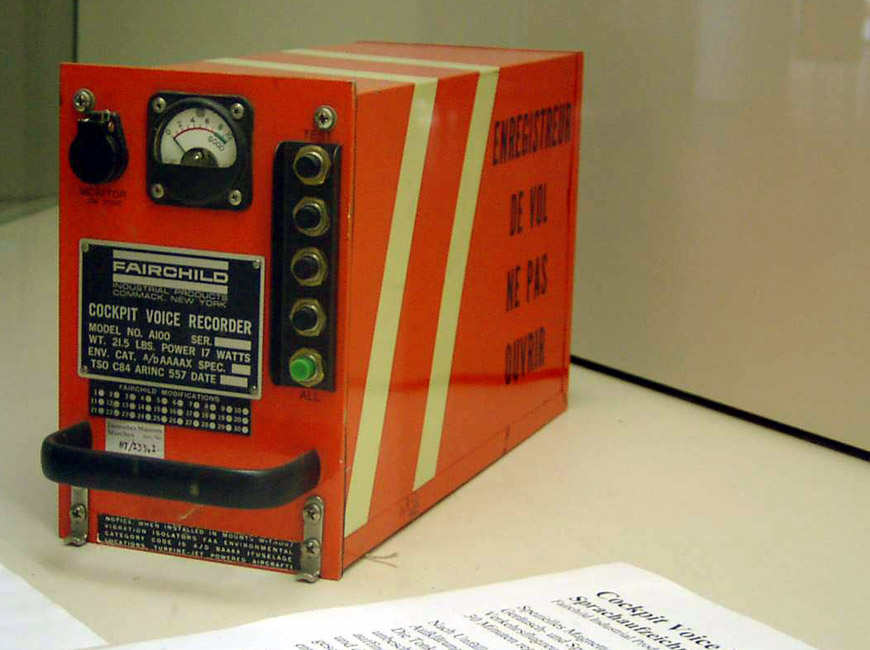
Cockpit voice recorder of the type that would have been on board

The crash was also witnessed by people in a nearby fire station on Flierbosdreef. First responders came upon a rapidly spreading fire of "gigantic proportions" that consumed all 11 floors of the buildings and was 120 metres (390 ft) wide. No one survived from the crash point, but some managed to escape from the remainder of the building. Witnesses reported seeing people jumping out of the building to escape the fire.

Hundreds of people were left homeless by the crash; the city's municipal buses were used to transport survivors to emergency shelters. Firefighters and police were also forced to deal with reports of looting in the area.

Prime Minister Ruud Lubbers and Queen Beatrix visited the scene of the disaster the following afternoon. The prime minister said, "This is a disaster that has shaken the whole country."

In the days immediately following the disaster, bodies of victims were recovered from the crash site. The mayor ordered rubble and aircraft wreckage removed, and investigators found the critical engine pylon fuse pins in the landfill. The two fallen engines were recovered from the Gooimeer, as were pieces of a 9-metre (30 ft) section of the right wing's leading edge. The remains of the aircraft were transported to Schiphol for analysis.

The aircraft's flight data recorder was recovered from the crash site and was heavily damaged, with the tape broken in four places. The section containing the data from the last two and a half minutes of the flight was particularly damaged. The recorder was sent to the United States for recovery and the data were successfully extracted. Despite intensive search activities to recover the cockpit voice recorder from the wreckage area, it was never found, though El Al employees stated that it had been installed in the aircraft.

== Causes ==
When Boeing 747 engines or engine pylons experience excessive load, the fuse pins holding the engine nacelle to the wing are designed to fracture cleanly, allowing the engine to separate from the aircraft without damaging the wing or wing fuel tank. Airliners are generally designed to remain airworthy in the event of an engine failure or separation, so they can be landed safely.

However, damage to a wing or wing fuel tank can have disastrous consequences. The Netherlands Aviation Safety Board found that the fuse pins had not failed properly, but instead had fatigue cracks prior to overload failure. The board developed a scenario of a probable sequence of events for the loss of engine three:

1. Gradual failure by fatigue and then overload failure of the inboard midspar fuse pin at the inboard thin-walled location
2. Overload failure of the outer lug of the inboard midspar pylon fitting
3. Overload failure of the outboard midspar fuse pin at the outboard thin-walled and fatigue-cracked location
4. Overload failure of the outboard midspar fuse pin at the inboard thin-walled location

This sequence of consecutive failures caused the inboard engine and pylon to break free. Its trajectory after breaking off the wing caused it to slam into the outboard engine and rip it and its pylon off the wing. Serious damage was also caused to the leading edge of the right wing. Both loss of hydraulic power and damage to the right wing prevented correct operation of the flaps the crew later tried to extend in flight.

Research indicated the crew were able to keep the aircraft in the air at first due to its high air speed (280 knots), though the damage to the right wing, resulting in reduced lift, had made keeping level more difficult. At 280 kn (520 km/h; 320 mph), nevertheless, lift on the right wing was sufficient to keep the aircraft aloft. Once it had to reduce speed for landing, the amount of lift on the right wing was insufficient to enable stable flight, so a safe landing would have been very difficult to achieve. The aircraft then banked sharply to the right with very little chance of recovery.

The official probable causes were determined to be:

The design and certification of the Boeing-747 pylon was found to be inadequate to provide the required level of safety. Furthermore the system to ensure structural integrity by inspection failed. This ultimately caused – probably initiated by fatigue in the inboard midspar fuse-pin – the no. 3 pylon and engine to separate from the wing in such a way that the no. 4 pylon and engine were torn off, part of the leading edge of the wing was damaged and the use of several systems was lost or limited. This subsequently left the flight crew with very limited control of the airplane. Because of the marginal controllability a safe landing became highly improbable, if not virtually impossible.

== Victims ==
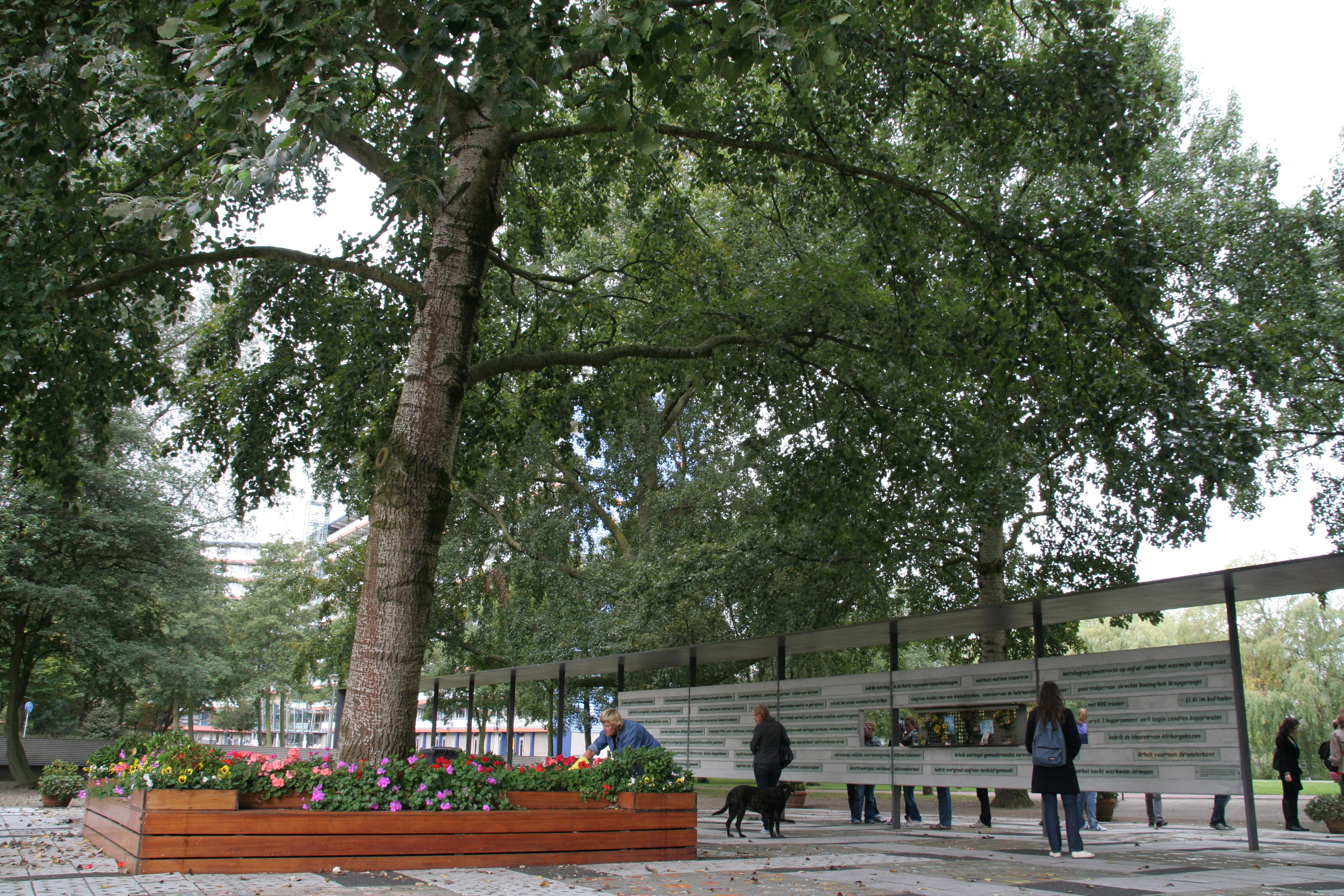
Memorial for the victims next to "the tree that saw it all"

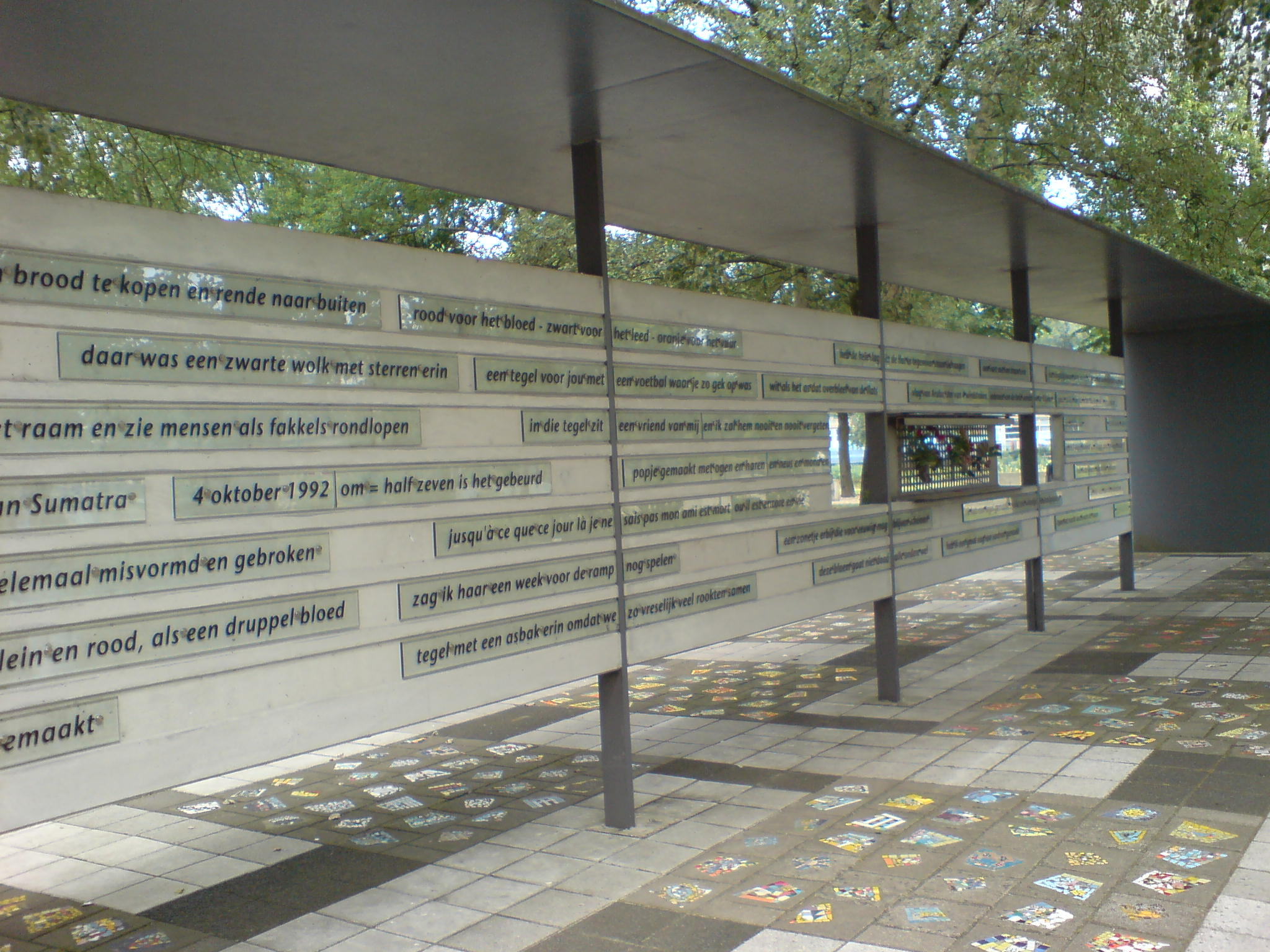
Flight 1862 Memorial by Herman Hertzberger

At least forty-seven people were killed in the disaster: all four occupants of the aircraft (three crew members and one nonrevenue passenger) and 43 people on the ground. This was considerably lower than expected; the police had originally estimated a death toll over 200 and Amsterdam Mayor Ed van Thijn had said that 240 people were missing. Twenty-six people sustained nonfatal injuries; 11 of them were injured seriously enough to require hospital treatment.

A belief has persisted that the actual number of victims killed in the crash was considerably higher. Bijlmermeer has a high number of residents living there illegally, particularly from Ghana and Suriname, and members of the Ghanaian community stated that they lost a considerable number of undocumented occupants who were not counted among the dead.

=== Memorial ===
A memorial, designed by architects Herman Hertzberger and Georges Descombes, was built near the crash site with the names of the victims. Flowers are laid at a grey poplar tree that survived the disaster, referred to as "the tree that saw it all" (de boom die alles zag). A public memorial is held annually to mark the disaster; no planes fly over the area for one hour out of respect for the victims.

== Health issues ==
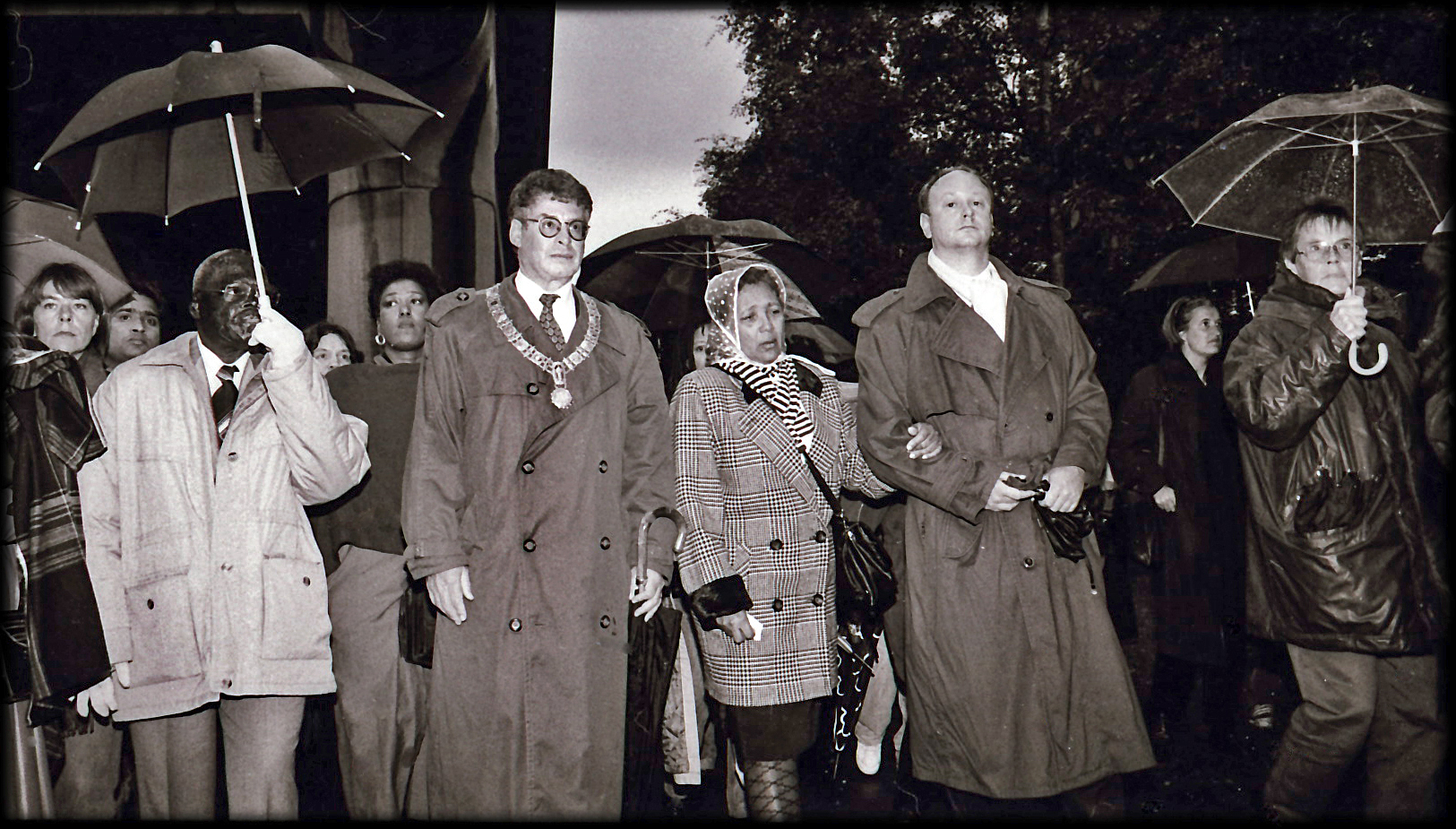
Amsterdam mayor Ed van Thijn during the first remembrance ceremony for the Bijlmer disaster in October 1992. The location is close to the crash site.

Mental health care was available after the crash to all affected residents and service personnel. After about a year, many residents and service personnel began approaching doctors with physical health symptoms, which the affected patients blamed on the El Al crash. Insomnia, chronic respiratory infections, general pain and discomfort, impotence, flatulence, and bowel symptoms were all reported. The Dutch authorities did not believe that the patients were suffering from these symptoms and instead suggested they were caused by mental health problems or trauma as a result of the crash. This was believed because there were no harmful substances reported to be on board of the aircraft. Eventually about 67% of the affected patients were found to be infected with Mycoplasma, and suffered from symptoms similar to the Gulf War syndrome or chronic fatigue syndrome-like symptoms.

Dutch officials from government departments of transport and of public health asserted that at the time of the crash, they understood that no health risks existed from any cargo on the aircraft; Els Borst, minister of public health, stated that "no extremely toxic, very dangerous, or radioactive materials" had been on board. In October 1993, the nuclear energy research foundation Laka reported that the tail contained 282 kilograms (622 lb) of depleted uranium as counterweight, as did all Boeing 747s at the time; this was not known during the rescue and recovery process.

Studies were suggested to be undertaken on the symptoms of the affected survivors and service personnel, but for several years, these suggestions were ignored on the basis that no practical reason would lead one to believe in any link between the health symptoms of the survivors and the Bijlmer crash site. In 1997, an expert testified in the Israeli parliament that dangerous products would have been released during combustion of the depleted uranium in the tail of the Boeing 747—an eventuality given consideration, but ruled out as improbable, in the Netherlands Air Safety Board's 1994 final report of the accident.

The first studies on the symptoms reported by survivors, performed by the Academisch Medisch Centrum (AMC), began in May 1998. The AMC eventually concluded that up to a dozen cases of autoimmune disorders among the survivors could be directly attributed to the crash, and health notices were distributed to doctors throughout the Netherlands requesting that extra attention be paid to symptoms of autoimmune disorder, particularly if the patient had a link with the Bijlmer crash site. However, by the time these studies came around, some survivors had already perished, possibly as a result of these autoimmune disorders. Another study, performed by the Rijksinstituut voor Volksgezondheid en Milieu, concluded that although toxic products had been released at the time of the crash, the added risks of cancer were small, about one or two additional cases per 10,000 exposed persons. The institute also concluded that the chances of uranium poisoning were minimal.

== Cargo ==
Soon after the disaster, it was announced that the aircraft had contained fruit, perfumes, and computer components. Dutch Minister Hanja Maij-Weggen asserted that she was certain that it contained no military cargo.

The survivors' health complaints following the crash increased the number of questions about the cargo. In 1998, El Al spokesman Nachman Klieman publicly revealed that 190L of dimethyl methylphosphonate, a CWC schedule 2 chemical, had been included in the cargo. The chemical is a reagent in the synthesis of sarin and soman nerve gases. Israel noted that the chemical had been listed on the cargo manifest in accordance with international regulations, the material was nontoxic, and its intended use was to test the filters of chemical weapon detectors. The Dutch foreign ministry confirmed that it had already known about the presence of chemicals on the aircraft. The shipment was from a US chemical plant to the Israel Institute for Biological Research under a US Department of Commerce license. According to the chemical weapons website CWInfo, the quantity involved was "too small for the preparation of a militarily useful quantity of Sarin, but would be consistent with making small quantities for testing detection methods and protective clothing."

== Related accidents and aftermath ==
This was one of several accidents caused by problems with Boeing 707 and 747 engine pylons, which were nearly identical in design.

On 8 April 1968, an engine and pylon had fallen off a Boeing 707, being operated as BOAC Flight 712, resulting in five deaths.

On 16 January 1987, a Transbrasil Boeing 707 (PT-TCP) lost its No. 2 engine with 150 people on board. It landed without incident and was later ferried on three engines for repair.

On 29 December 1991, China Airlines Cargo Flight 358 had crashed similarly when its No. 3 and No. 4 engines fell off shortly after takeoff from Taipei, resulting in the death of all five occupants.

On 31 March 1992, another similar scenario occurred with Trans-Air Service Flight 671. Engines No. 3 and No. 4 (both right wing engines) detached from the aircraft – this time on a Boeing 707. Again, No. 3 engine detached and collided with No. 4 engine, tearing it off as well. The crew landed safely at Istres Air Base in the south of France.

In April 1992, a Tampa Colombia 707 cargo flight was forced to return to Miami, when the No. 3 engine separated shortly after takeoff.

On 31 March 1993, Japan Air Lines Cargo Flight 46E, a Boeing 747-121F (freighter), operated by Evergreen International Airlines returned to Anchorage International Airport after the No. 2 engine (inner-most left engine) detached.

After this accident, Boeing issued a service directive to all owners of the 747 regarding its fuse pins. Engines and pylons had to be removed from 747s and the fuse pins examined for defects. If cracks were present, the pins were to be replaced.

== Depictions ==
The crash was depicted in the National Geographic documentary series Seconds from Disaster (in the 2006 episode "Amsterdam Air Crash") and Mayday, known as Air Crash Investigation outside North America (in the 2016 episode "High Rise Catastrophe").

The crash and its aftermath were the basis for a five-part Dutch TV docudrama series titled Rampvlucht ('Disaster Flight') (nl), which premiered on Dutch public broadcaster NPO on 4 October 2022, the 30th anniversary of the crash. It follows a Bijlmermeer-based veterinarian and two journalists, Vincent Dekker and Pierre Heijboer who drafted themselves to find the cause of this crash in 1992, find themselves drawn into a years-long investigation into the many puzzling questions surrounding the official narrative about the crash. The series was awarded the 2022 Golden Calf for Best TV Series.

== See also ==
- Aviation safety
- List of accidents and incidents involving commercial aircraft
- American Airlines Flight 191 – 1979 air disaster also involving loss of control due to engine detachment
- Surinam Airways Flight 764 – 1989 aircraft crash involving several passengers from Bijlmer
- 1991 Gulf War Boeing KC-135 accident
- Trans-Air Service Flight 671 – 1992 air incident also involving an in-flight separation of two engines
- Japan Air Lines Cargo Flight 46E – 1993 air incident involving another 747 freighter with an engine detachment
- 2020 South West Aviation Antonov An-26 crash
