= China Airlines Flight 358 =

1991 aviation accident

China Airlines Cargo Flight 358
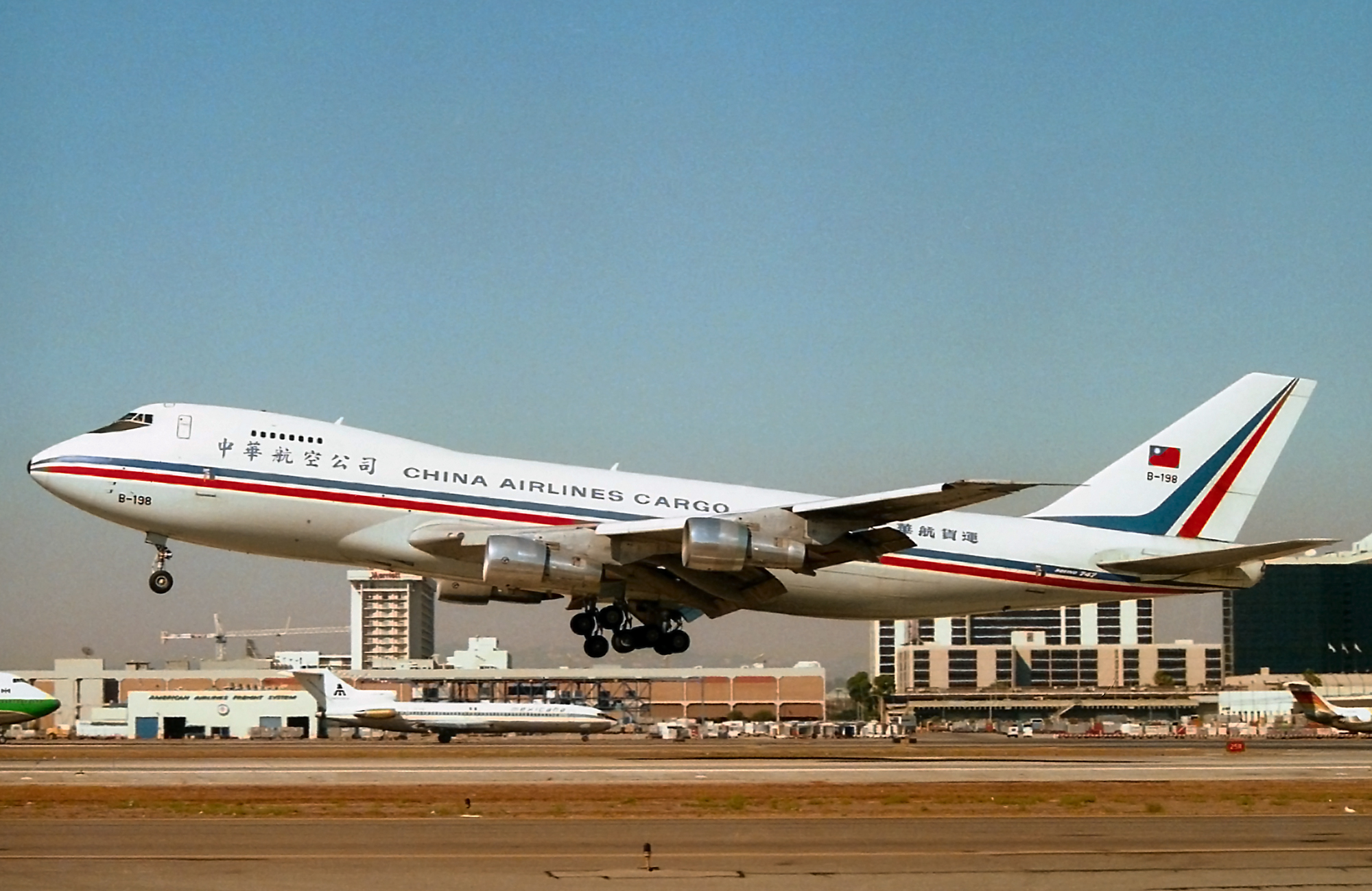
- B-198, the aircraft involved, seen at Los Angeles International Airport in 1990.

Accident
- Date: 29 December 1991
- Summary: Engine detachment due to improper maintenance
- Site: Wanli, Taiwan; 25°11′1.6″N 121°40′58.8″E

Aircraft
- Aircraft type: Boeing 747-2R7F/SCD
- Operator: China Airlines Cargo
- IATA flight No.: CI358
- ICAO flight No.: CAL358
- Call sign: DYNASTY 358
- Registration: B-198
- Flight origin: Chiang Kai-shek Int'l Airport; Taipei, Taiwan
- Destination: Anchorage International Airport; Anchorage, Alaska, United States
- Occupants: 5
- Crew: 5
- Fatalities: 5
- Survivors: 0

China Airlines Flight 358 was a Boeing 747-200 freighter that crashed on December 29, 1991, shortly after takeoff from Chiang Kai-shek International Airport near Taipei, Taiwan. All five crew members were killed.

== Aircraft ==
The aircraft was a Boeing 747-2R7F/SCD, built in September 1980 for Cargolux as the City of Esch-sur-Alzette, registration LX-ECV, MSN 22390. It was acquired by China Airlines in June 1985 and was re-registered as B-198. It had been in service for 11 years and 3 months. The aircraft had clocked a total of 45,868 hours of flight time and 9,095 takeoff and landing cycles during its time in service. The last A-check maintenance had occurred on 21 December 1991, and the aircraft had accumulated 74 hours of flight time since that point.

The aircraft was the same one involved in the China Airlines Flight 334 hijacking on 3 May 1986 but was later restored into business after the hijacking.

== Accident ==
Several minutes after takeoff, while at an altitude of 5,000 ft (1,500 m), the crew reported problems with the number 3 engine, prompting Taipei air traffic control (ATC) to vector the flight into a left turn to return to the airport. Approximately two minutes later, the crew reported that they were unable to turn left, and ATC approved a right-hand turn instead. This was the last radio contact made by the crew. The crew lost control of the aircraft and it struck a hill, right wing first, near Wanli, Taipei. The crash occurred at approximately 3:05 p.m, at an altitude of 700 feet (210 m). All five crew members died in the crash, and there were no injuries on the ground.

== Investigation ==
The subsequent investigation revealed that the number 3 engine and its pylon had separated from the aircraft and struck the number 4 engine, breaking it off the wing as well. A more detailed investigation revealed that the pylon midspar fittings, which attach the pylon to the lower portion of the wing front spar, had failed. The search for the number 3 engine and its pylon, which landed in the sea, took several months.

Information from the investigation of this crash and the nearly identical crash of El Al Flight 1862 ten months later resulted in Boeing ordering pylon modifications to every 747 in use.

== See also ==
- Trans-Air Service Flight 671 – a 707 that suffered a dual engine separation but landed safely
- American Airlines Flight 191 – another flight that also crashed due to engine detachment caused by maintenance error
- China Airlines Flight 611 – another 747-200 that also crashed shortly after takeoff from Taipei in 2002
