= Cross-strait charter =

Charter flights flying directly between Taiwan and mainland China

NAVAIDs for cross-strait flights between Mainland China and Taiwan, agreed by both sides.

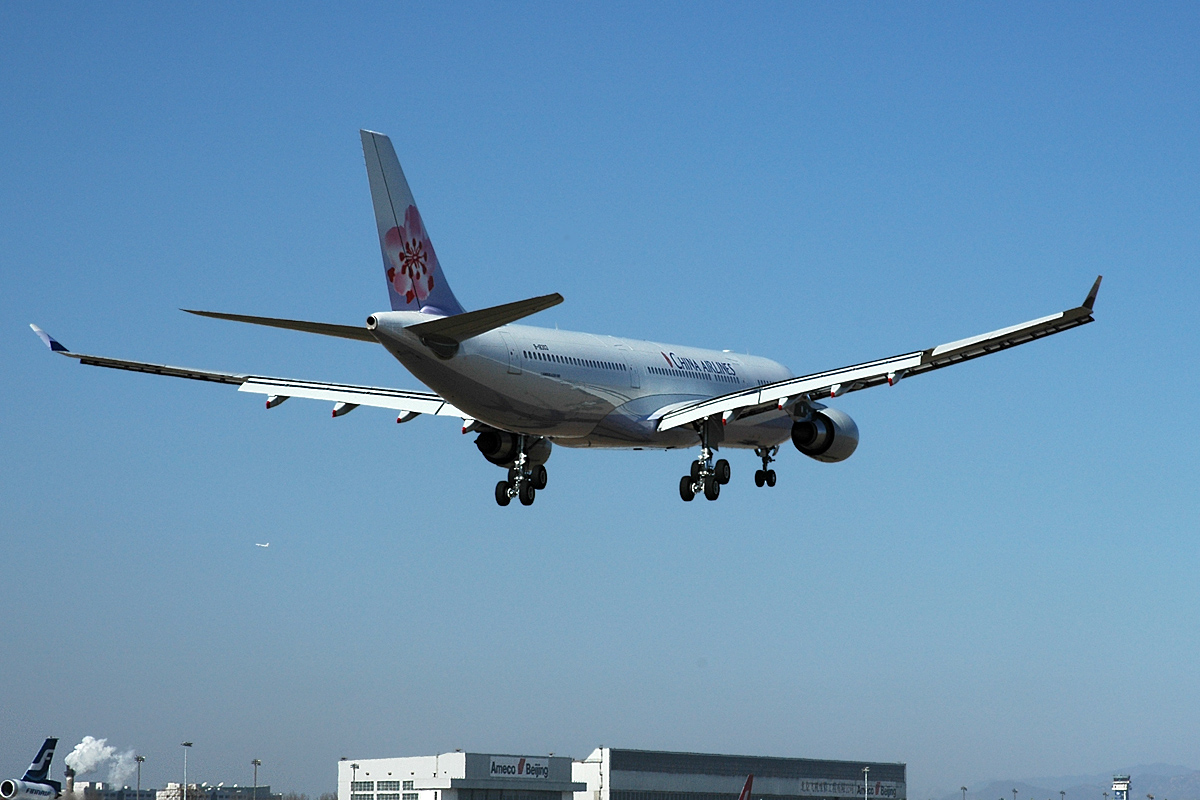
On January 29, 2005, China Airlines Flight 581 took off from Taoyuan International Airport and landed at Beijing International Airport.

A cross-strait charter (simplified Chinese: 两岸包机; traditional Chinese: 兩岸包機; pinyin: liǎng'àn bāojī) is a charter flight between Taiwan and mainland China, across the Taiwan Strait. After the Chinese Civil War, no direct flights were allowed between Taiwan and mainland China; this remained the case until 2003. Passengers had to transfer in a third city, such as Hong Kong, to complete their trip.

For the years 2003 and 2005, the scheme was restricted for the Chinese New Year period, so it was then called the Lunar New Year cross-strait charter (simplified Chinese: 两岸春节包机; traditional Chinese: 兩岸春節包機; pinyin: liǎng'àn chūnjié bāojī) in Taiwan, and the charter for Taiwan residents (simplified Chinese: 台湾居民包机; traditional Chinese: 臺灣居民包機; pinyin: táiwān jūmín bāojī) in mainland China. For these years, the scheme was restricted for Taiwanese businessmen and their family members (excluding students and tourists) who are in mainland China to travel to and from Taiwan.

In 2006, the service was opened to all residents of Taiwan for the first time. From the 2006 Mid-Autumn Festival onwards, the valid period of the agreement was expanded to four main Chinese festivals: Qingming Festival, Dragon Boat Festival, Mid-Autumn Festival, and the original Chinese New Year.

In July 2008, charter flights expanded to weekends. Flight restrictions on nationalities were removed and mainland China residents as well as foreign citizens were able to take the flights.

In November 2008, flights became daily instead of only for the weekends. 108 weekly flights were established and the planes no longer had to travel through Hong Kong airspace, cutting travel times by two thirds in some cases such as flying from Taipei to Shanghai.

In April 2009, a new agreement was reached to allow cross-strait flights to become regularly scheduled instead of chartered. The cap on the flights was also raised to 270 flights per week, effective 31 August 2009. On 22 May 2010, another 100 additional weekly flights were permitted to be operated effective 14 June 2010, and Shanghai Hongqiao International Airport and Shijiazhuang Airport were added to the list of valid destinations.

== Background ==
There was no official contact for over 50 years between the governments of Taiwan – where the Kuomintang (KMT) had retreated and mainland China since the Chinese Communist Party established the People's Republic of China in 1949, after the Chinese Civil War. However, when the reform and opening up began welcoming foreign funds in the 1980s, mainland China sought greater contact with Taiwan. Chiang Ching-kuo refused, beginning a policy of "Three Noes". The Three Noes policy was abandoned, however, when a flight bound for Taiwan was hijacked in 1986 and Taiwan was forced to negotiate with mainland China, beginning a series of negotiations. Merchants started investing in mainland China and people visited their relatives. Air traffic between Taiwan and mainland China grew dramatically, but no direct flights were allowed. Passengers traveling to mainland China had to travel via an intermediate destination such as Hong Kong or Macau, or via South Korea and Japan. The travel time usually took more than a half day, especially during the holidays such as the Spring Festival.

In the 1990s, the government of mainland China proposed the 'three direct links' – including direct air flights between mainland China and Taiwan – to ease the travel problem. However, the Taiwanese government rejected this idea.

In 2002, Taiwan legislator John Chiang proposed that there should be special charters across the strait, and received support from the public and the aviation industry in Taiwan.

== The talks ==
The previous regime of negotiations via the Straits Exchange Foundation and the Association for Relations Across the Taiwan Straits had broken down by the time Chen Shui-bian came to office in 2000. A political impasse prevented the resumption of semi-official dialogue, because the People's Republic of China government insisted on the recognition of the one China principle or the more ambiguous 1992 consensus as the basis for the talks. By contrast, the Republic of China government under Chen Shui-bian did not recognize the one China principle and repudiated the 1992 consensus reached under the previous administration. As a result, aviation industry bodies were accredited by the respective governments to negotiate only on the technical and operational aspects of the charter flights.

The governmental bodies politically responsible for the talks were the ROC Affairs Office of the State Council of the People's Republic of China, led by Chen Yunlin.

From 2000 to 2008, progress of talks were often severely affected by the political climate in Taiwan. After the re-election of the Chen Shui-bian government in 2004, the talks for the 2004 Chinese New Year charter flights were aborted when the PRC government was offended by Chen's independence-leaning rhetoric talks.

=== Aviation industry ===
Aviation companies operated at a large loss for the 2003 charter flights due to the fact that all passengers could only travel one-way – that is, the flights traveled with no passengers for half the journey. Moreover, due to complicated procedures set out in the talks, the aviation companies could not hold direct flights and had to travel through Hong Kong or Macau, greatly increasing their cost. Nonetheless, the aviation companies were glad to provide the services, in part due to the historical nature and also due to the possible promotional benefits from participating in the events, which were widely reported by the media.

=== Reaction in Taiwan and in mainland China ===
The Pan-Blue coalition, which led the talks from Taiwan, supported the charter flights. The majority Pan-Green coalition, however, saw it as a "step towards reunification" which the Taiwanese people do not prefer and criticised the Pan-Blue coalition for holding talks with the PRC without government permission. The Taiwanese public at large, and especially the merchants who benefited the most, supported the charter flights, and the Pan-Blue coalition benefited from the positive response.

== 2003 Charters ==
- Time Period: 26 January to 9 February 2003
- Number of flights: 16
- Passengers: ROC businesspersons only
- Destinations: Shanghai <-> Taipei, Kaohsiung
- Airlines: Six Taiwanese carriers
- Number of Travelers: approximate 2600
- Feature: One way only, with a mandatory stop-over

=== Events ===
- 27 October 2002: ROC legislator John Chiang proposed The Project of Mainland Taiwanese Businesspeople Returning Home, the project of "the direct charter". He said that Taiwanese airliners should be allowed to carry merchants back to Taipei at certain times, between selected airports, during the Lunar New Year.
- 30 October 2002: The Taiwan Affairs Office of the State Council stated their willingness to help Taiwan merchants return home. The PRC claimed the idea of equality and mutual benefit, hoping that PRC carriers could also provide services; however, the ROC government disagreed.
- 4 December 2002: The ROC government established regulations for allowing ROC business people to return to mainland China:

1. Only ROC operators could fly the routes during the Chinese New Year as a charter.
2. Flights may only originate in Taipei's Chiang Kai-shek International Airport (Taiwan Taoyuan International Airport) and Kaohsiung International Airport, and may only arrive in Shanghai Hongqiao International Airport or Shanghai Pudong International Airport.
3. Charters must have at least one stopover in either Hong Kong or Macau, with no traffic between the stopover and both Taiwan and mainland China cities.
4. Passengers may only be merchants and their families.

- Between late 2002 and early 2003, six Taiwanese airlines applied to run the charters.
- On 26 January 2003, at 3:55 am, China Airlines flight 585 operated with a Boeing 747 departed from Chiang Kai-shek International Airport of Taipei. The crew consisted of pilots Zhang Yisong and Chen Beibei on board. After a stop in Hong Kong, the aircraft landed successfully at Shanghai Pudong International Airport at 8:52 am, and became the first legal Taiwanese aircraft to land in mainland China for more than 54 years.
- On 11:15 am, a China Airlines flight carrying 222 passengers took off from Pudong International Airport and arrived at Taiwan Taoyuan International Airport at 3:40 am with a short stop in Hong Kong.
- On the same day, TransAsia Airways flight 386, an Airbus A320, left Taipei with no passengers at 8:20, and reached Shanghai at 12:40 pm via Macau. The return flight with 137 passengers departed Shanghai at 2 pm, and arrived Kaohsiung at 6:15 with a stopover in Macau.
- On 9 February, China Airlines flight 585 was the last flight of the 2003 Lunar New Year charter services. The flight arrived with 237 travelers on board in Pudong International Airport at 11:14 pm the same day.

The period of 16 charter flights occurred between 26 January and 9 February 2003.

=== Flight record ===
Airlines	From Shanghai to Taiwan	Stop-over	From Taiwan to Shanghai
China Airlines	26 January	Hong Kong	9 February
TransAsia Airways	26 January	Macau	7 February
Far Eastern Air Transport	27,28,29 January (3 flights in total)	Macau	5,6,7 February (3 flights in total)
EVA Air	29 January	Macau	8 February
Uni Air	29 January	Macau	8 February
Mandarin Airlines	30 January	Hong Kong	7 February

=== Flight details ===
- China Airlines (CAL) operated the first flight. Due to the one-way-only service restriction, only the crew, securities of the Ministry of Transportation and Communications (ROC side), two officers of the Mainland Affairs Council, and 14 CAL staff were on board the Taipei-Shanghai section for the first flights ceremony.
- After coming to a complete standstill, staff at Pudong International Airport showed a large red banner with the words "热烈欢迎中华航空公司包机首航上海" (Ardently welcome CAL's First charter flight to Shanghai). A "Lion Dance" show was held.
- CAL CEO Wei, Philip Hsing-Hsiung (present Chairman) and crew waved their hands in greeting when stepping out the aircraft.
- Due to the sensitive state and the problem on using the Taiwan Compatriot Pass, the vice secretary of the Mainland Affairs Council, Zhi-Hong Jam(詹志宏) did not attend the celebration but stayed in the aircraft after a short salutation.
- At C.K.S. International Airport, Taipei, CAL arranged a small ceremony to salute the first passengers. Then CAL Chairman Lee, Yun-Ning said "It's better to have direct flight as soon as possible. It's better to have it from tomorrow."
- The greeting ceremony was different in Kaohsiung. Numerous police were inside the terminal waiting for TransAsia's flight back to Kaohsiung.

== 2005 Charters ==
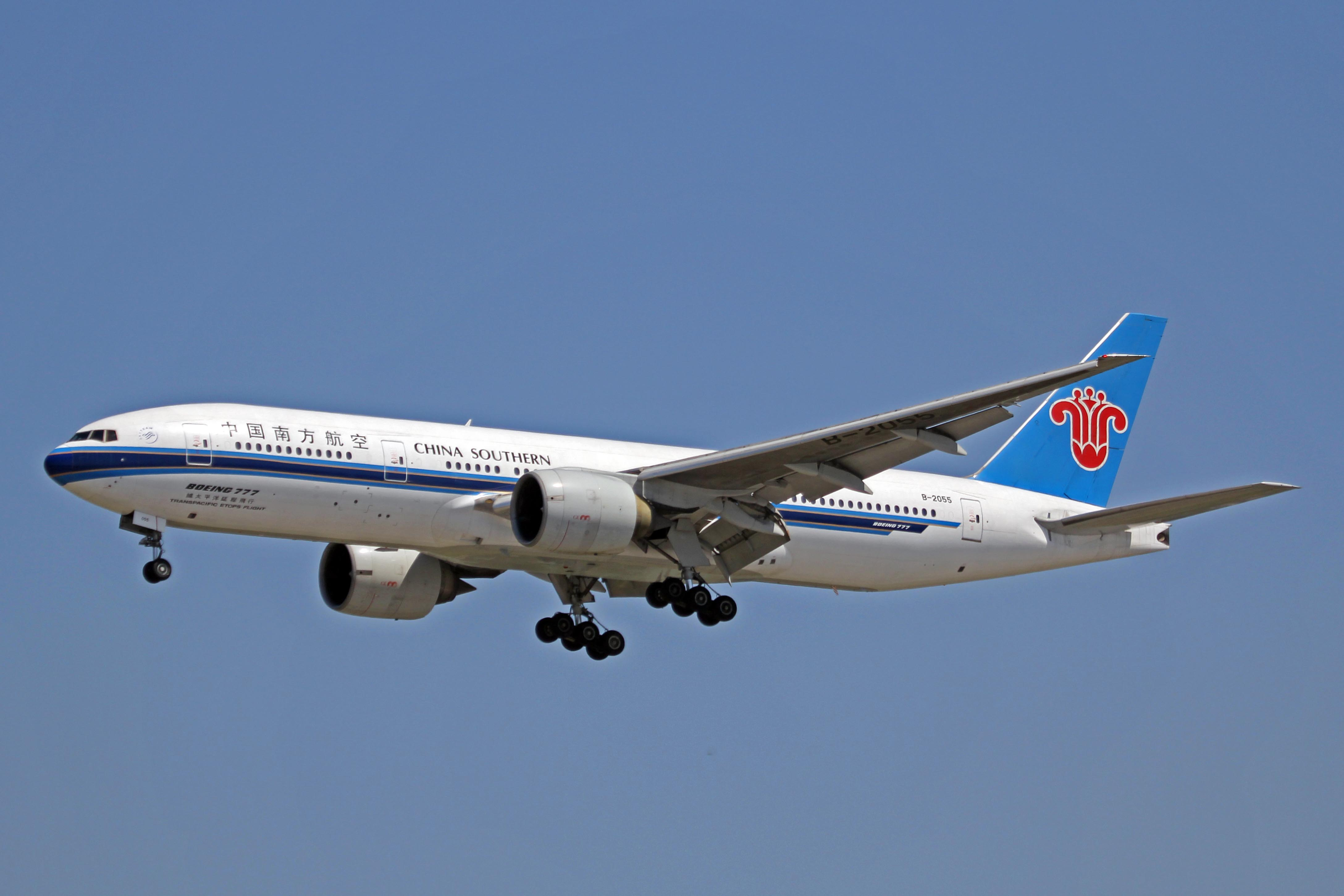
B-2055 was the first mainland civil aircraft to legally land in Taiwan after over 50 years of war.

- Time Period: 26 January to 20 February 2005
- Number of flights: 48
- Passengers: Mainly businesspeople, some tourists and overseas students
- Destinations: Beijing, Shanghai, Guangzhou <-> Taipei, Kaohsiung
- Airlines: Six Taiwanese carriers and six Chinese airlines
- Number of travelers: more than 10,000
- Features: Both way available without any stopover

=== Events ===
- There was no charter service in 2004 for several reasons, including the ROC presidential election in which the independence-leaning Pan-Green coalition was re-elected.
- In December 2004, John Chiang expressed high expectations for the 2005 charter.
- On 2 January 2005, the spokesperson of The Taiwan Affairs Office of the State Council proclaimed that they do care for the accomplishment of 2005 charters. They also demanded that the services this time should be operated as round-trip, non-stop service by airlines of both side with an increased number of destinations. They suggested the civil airlines negotiate with each other on technical and operational problems.
- 9 January 2005: A delegation attending a conference called the Mission Animating the Tai-merchants Charters led by John Chiang arrived in Beijing.
- 10 January 2005: Chen Yunlin, minister of the Taiwan Affairs Office (PRC), delegate of the General Administration of Civil Aviation (PRC) met during the mission. Chen said he would urge to carry the air links into reality.
- 11 January 2005: During the conference, the PRC aspect hoped the available airports could include Taichung. But the proposal was rejected by the ROC because Taichung Airport is an air force base. The ROC aspect hoped the destinations could be more than Beijing and Shanghai, like Guangzhou, Xiamen, Chongqing, and Shenzhen. The ROC also wished that flights could fly through Okinawa Flight Information Region in order to reduce the unnecessarily lengthy flight time. The PRC refused the Okinawa proposal in avoiding the charters being considered as international flights. They only permitted the flights go via the air space of Hong Kong and Macau.
- On 15 January the civil operators came to terms. The agreement is as follows,

1. Time Period: 29 January-20 February 2005.
2. Restricted destinations: Beijing, Shanghai, Guangzhou <-> Taipei, Kaohsiung
3. Airlines on both sides could apply for the charters to the relevant government departments on the opposite side. Charters would be operated in the type of "Both-joining, directly non-stop, carrying passengers both ways (round-trip), and more dots (means destinations in Chinese) included".
4. Only Tai-merchants could take the flights.
5. Planes had to go through the Hong Kong Flight Information Region without landing.

- Between 29 January and 20 February 2005, twelve mainland Chinese and Taiwanese airlines flew 48 charters.
- At 7:46 am on 29 January, Air China Flight 1087 was the first flight to depart mainland China with 88 passengers. China Airlines flight 581 was the first aircraft to depart Taiwan from Chiang Kai-shek International Airport in Taipei.
- At 9:20 am, China Southern Airlines Flight 3097, originating in Guangzhou, arrived at Chiang Kai-Shek International Airport in Taipei. China Southern became the first airline to legally land in Taiwan after the Chinese Civil War. The reason why the earliest-departed was not the earliest-arrived is that Guangzhou, which is located in the southern province of Guangdong, is far closer to Taiwan than Beijing.
- On 20 February, the last charter of the year, Hainan Airlines flight 7952, arrived at Beijing Capital International Airport at 9:30 pm.

=== Flight records ===
The six mainland Chinese airlines originated in three cities in mainland China: Beijing (Air China, Hainan Airlines), Shanghai (China Eastern Airlines), and Guangzhou (China Southern Airlines, Xiamen Airlines). All Air China's flight are operated by Shandong Airlines' aircraft to avoid Air China's livery which features the "Five Star Red Flag".

The Taiwanese airlines were the same as in 2003. Most Taiwanese flights departing for Guangzhou (TransAsia Airways), and Kaohsiung were mainly serviced by Uni Air.

== One-Way/round-trip argument ==
As the 2005 charter flights were only for Taiwanese merchants returning home for the Chinese New Year, there would not be a demand to travel from Taiwan to mainland China before the New Year's Day. Neither would there be people needing to travel on the flights from mainland China to Taiwan that operated on dates after the New Year period.

In order to make sure the original purpose was not violated, in the 2003 case the ROC government ensured that passengers could only travel one way. That restriction meant no one was allowed to fly from Taiwan to mainland China before the festival, and no one could travel on the return flight after the festival.

However, since the 2005 charters, the ROC government approved of passengers traveling the entire round-trip with other limits.

== 2006 Charters ==
- Time span: 20 January 2006 to 13 February 2006
- Number of flights: 36 flights in each direction, 72 flights in total
- Main target: Taiwanese residents
- Cities served: PRC -- Beijing, Shanghai, Guangzhou, Xiamen; ROC -- Taipei, Kaohsiung
- Airlines: 6 airline companies from ROC and PRC
  - PRC -- Air China, China Eastern Airlines, China Southern Airlines, Shanghai Airlines, Xiamen Airlines, Hainan Airlines
  - ROC -- China Airlines, Eva Air, Mandarin Airlines, Uni Air, TransAsia Airways, Far Eastern Air Transport
- Number of passengers: To be tabulated
- Features: Direct flights to and from mainland China, passing through Hong Kong Flight Information Region

=== Events ===
- 18 November 2005: Vice director-general of Cross-Straits Aviation Transport Exchange Council (海峡两岸航空运输交流委员会) Pu Zhaozhou said at the news conference of the Taiwan Affairs Office of the State Council that the plan for 2006 charters has been confirmed.
- 20 January 2006: at 07:06, China Airlines flight CI 585, the earliest-departed charter, took off at Taipei Chiang Kai-Shek International Airport, and arrived at Shanghai at around noon. The returning flight (same aircraft with new flight number - CI586) included a Taiwanese motor neurone disease patient, the 1960s singer Ye Ling (葉彩育). The ROC's Mainland Affairs Council also permitted two mainland Chinese paramedics to take the charter to assist Ye. This was also the first time for heavily injured or disabled people to be able to travel home directly across the strait for their treatment. China Airlines, especially for her, installed six seats in a row with two left. The spare space was for her stretcher's settlement; this made Ye's way home comfortable. "My Wife couldn't make her way back to Taiwan if there had not been the charters!" her husband said appreciatively.
- 2006 was the first time that Xiamen was added as a destination.

=== Flight details ===
- As contrasted from the extensive media coverage in 2005, the media and airlines considered the 2006 charter flights as ordinary flights. The airline operating the first-departed charter, China Airlines, did not hold any ceremony; it only saw the charter as a normal commercial flight. There were less news reports from both sides of the straits. Only the Taiwanese Eastern Television and the mainland Chinese CCTV had some reports on news programs.
- Specially-designed aircraft was the focus of this year. Most airlines sent out their aircraft with special liveries to fly the routes:
  - Air China used a Boeing 737-700 aircraft which registration number is B-5202 with logos and slogan, One World, One Dream, of 2008 Beijing Olympics on it.
  - EVA Air used an Airbus A330 aircraft, registration number B-16303, which has Hello Kitty characters painted on it. It flew the Taipei - Beijing route.
  - Hainan Airlines' "Happy Waves" (快樂海浪) special-painted plane operated the Beijing-Taipei flight, symbolizing the cheerful setting sail.
  - Far Eastern Air Transport flew to Xiamen with their painted plane "unlimited dignity", showing respect to all charter passengers.

== 2008 Humanitarian flights ==
Date: 16 May 2008

Airlines: EVA Air (Chongqing), China Airlines (Chongqing), TransAsia Airways (Chongqing), Mandarin Airlines (Chengdu)

Due to the Sichuan earthquake, many Taiwan travelers were unable to get flights out of the quake region. Both governments reached a deal and chartered four flights to depart from Chengdu and Chongqing to Taiwan on 16 May.

== 2008 Charters ==
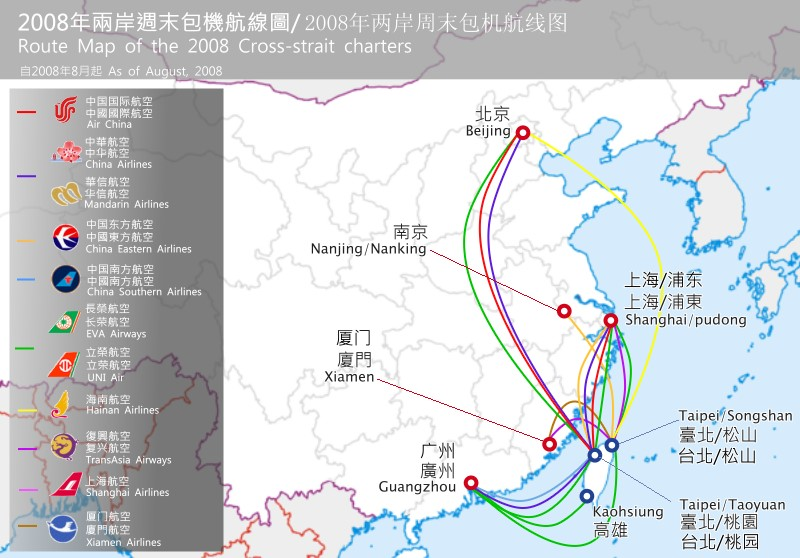
Route Map of the weekend Cross-strait charter, for flights as of August 2008.

Under an agreement reached on 13 June 2008, charter flights began on weekends starting 4 July 2008. A total of 18 flights per weekend (Friday to Monday) are allowed under this agreement. Unlike previous charters, anyone with legal traveling documents, regardless of nationality, were allowed to travel on these charter flights. Initially, mainland China permitted flights from Beijing, Shanghai (Pudong Airport), Guangzhou, Xiamen, and Nanjing airports, and the plan was to permit flights from Chengdu, Chongqing, Dalian, Guilin, Shenzhen, Shenyang, Xi'an and other spots with market demand in the future, while the ROC government permitted flights from Taiwan Taoyuan Airport, Taipei Songshan Airport, Kaohsiung, Taichung, Makung, Hualien, Kinmen, and Taitung.

On 4 July 2008, the first flight carrying 230 passengers belonging to China Southern Airlines arrived at Taoyuan International Airport.

== Three Links ==
Starting on 15 December 2008, direct flights, direct shippings and direct mail were fully restored between mainland China and Taiwan per the Three Links agreement. It marks the end of cross-strait charter flights and marks the beginning of regular scheduled flights. Shanghai and Taipei Area Control Centres can pass traffic to each other at SULEM (Waypoint in Aviation) in the northern flight path while there is no direct pass-off for the southern flight path.

== See also ==
- Three Links
- Political status of Taiwan
- History of the Republic of China
- Cross-strait relations
- Kuomintang
