= Three Noes =

Taiwan foreign policy

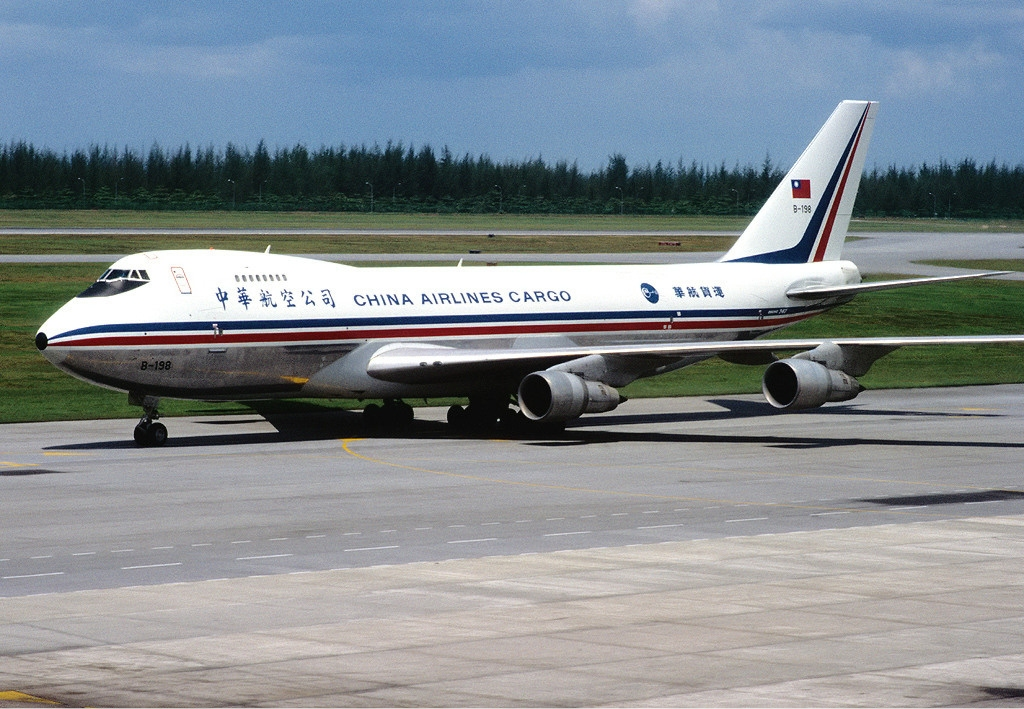
China Airlines Flight 334, whose hijacking led to the end of the policy

The Three-Noes Policy (Chinese: 三不政策; pinyin: Sān Bù Zhèngcè) was a policy established in April 1979 and maintained by President Chiang Ching-kuo of the Republic of China, commonly known as Taiwan, in response to the People's Republic of China's attempts to have direct contact with the ROC (see Three Links). When the United States broke diplomatic ties with the ROC in 1979, the PRC believed that it had complete leverage in convincing the ROC government to talk. President Chiang Ching-kuo refused, reiterating that there were to be "no contact, no negotiation and no compromise" (不接觸，不談判，不妥協) with the Chinese Communists.

The hijacking of a China Airlines cargo plane on May 3, 1986, shattered the "Three Noes" policy. The pilot Wang Shi-chuen subdued the two other members of the flight crew and commandeered the plane to Guangzhou, forcing the ROC government to publicly send unofficial envoys to negotiate in Hong Kong with PRC officials over the return of the plane and the flight crew. The pilot, credited by the PRC for reestablishing contact between mainland China and Taiwan, received a hero's welcome in mainland China and became a senior PRC aviation official as well as serving as a so-called "Taiwanese delegate" to PRC government institutions.

During this time, many mainland China-born ROC armed forces veterans pressed President Chiang Ching-kuo to allow family reunions between the mainland Chinese who settled in Taiwan after the Chinese Civil War and their relatives in mainland China. President Chiang relented in 1987, authorizing the ROC Red Cross to issue permits allowing people from Taiwan to travel to mainland China only for family reunions. This started the ongoing regular civilian and unofficial exchanges between the PRC and the ROC.

In July 1987, Chiang ended martial law in Taiwan, and residents of Taiwan were able to visit relatives in China that November. From June 1988, mail from Taiwan sent to Chinese addresses were routed through Hong Kong. Phone calls were routed through the United States, Japan and Singapore until 10 June 1989. Among the first direct calls placed to China were Taiwanese journalists asking about the 1989 Tiananmen Square protests and massacre.

== The new Three Noes ==
President Ma Ying-jeou later established a new "three noes" policy as part of his foreign policy towards the PRC:

- No unification with the PRC in the short-term
- No declaration of independence
- No use of force

== See also ==
- Four Noes and One Without
- Cross-strait relations
