= Huangqi, Lianjiang County =

Huangqi 黄岐镇 Huang-ch’i, Huangchi
- Town
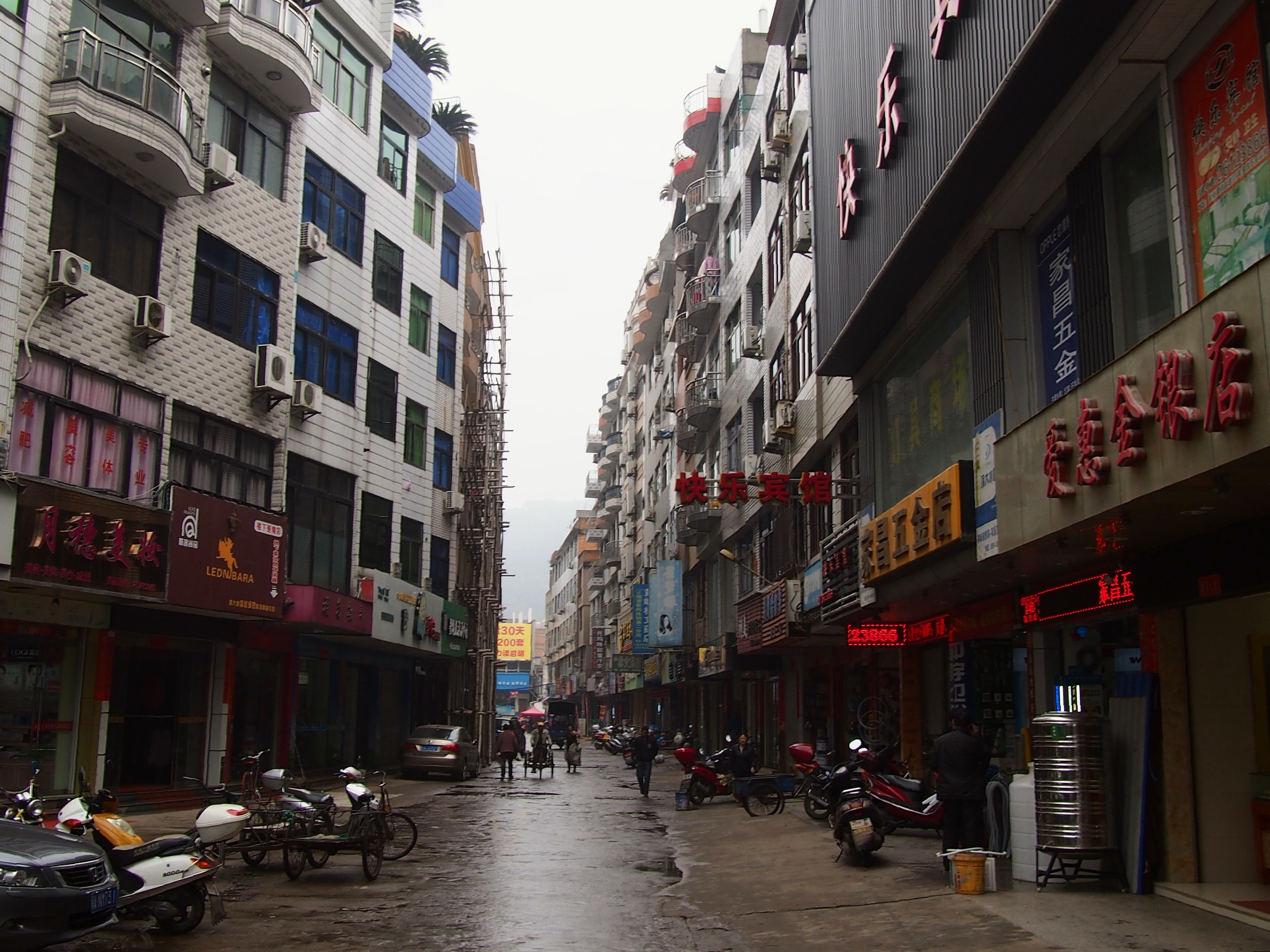
- Huangqi Town

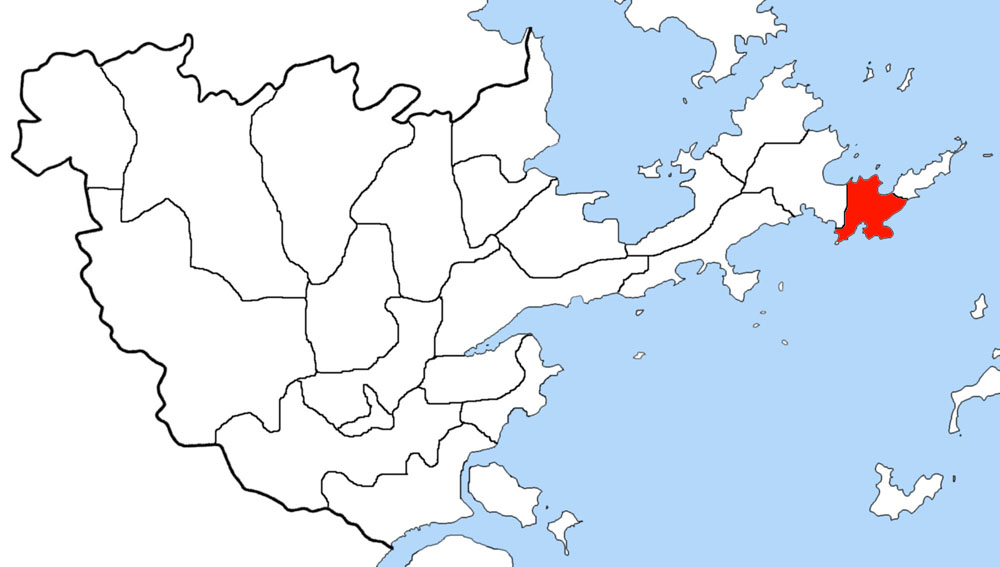
- Location in Lianjiang County

- Location in Fujian Huangqi (China)
- Coordinates: 26.324039°N 119.883696°E
- Country: China
- Province: Fujian
- Prefecture-level city: Fuzhou
- County: Lianjiang
- Village-level divisions: 4 residential communities 7 villages

Area
  - Total: 13.5 km^{2} (5.2 sq mi)

Population (2010)
  - Total: 23,368
  - Density: 1,730/km^{2} (4,480/sq mi)
- Time zone: UTC+8 (China Standard)

Huangqi (Chinese: 黄岐镇; pinyin: Huángqí Zhèn; historically known as Huángqí 黃崎; also known as Fèngqí 鳳岐) is a town in Lianjiang County, Fuzhou, Fujian, China. Huangqi is located on the Huangqi Peninsula (黄岐半岛) / Beijiao Peninsula (北茭半島) (including nearby islands) and is bordered to the east by the town of Tailu, to the west by the township of Ankai and to the south by the East China Sea, across which Lienchiang County (the Matsu Islands), Taiwan (ROC) can be seen.

== History ==
In September 1958, Huangqi Commune (黄岐公社) was established.

In April 1979, Tailu Commune (苔菉公社) and Ankai Commune (安凯公社) were established from parts of Huangqi Commune.

In June 1984, Huangqi Commune became Huangqi Township (黄岐乡). In November 1984, Huangqi Township became Huangqi Town (黄岐镇).

On December 23, 2015, the Huangqi-Matsu ship route was introduced as part of the Mini Three Links.

== Geography ==
The shortest distance between Huangqi and the Matsu Islands is also the shortest distance between China (PRC) administered territory and territory in the ROC-administered Matsu Islands.

Islands in Huangqi include:

- Donggu Jiao (东鼓礁) / Donggujiao Qundao (东鼓礁群岛) 26.295856°N 119.893463°E
- Houyu Dao (鲎屿岛) 26°21′N 119°52′E
- Jinsha Niuyu Dao (金沙牛屿岛) 26°18′N 119°51′E
- Jinsha Qundao (金沙群岛) 26°18′N 119°51′E
- Niuweidongyu Dao (牛尾东屿岛) 26°17′N 119°53′E
- Pingkuai Yu (坪块屿) 26°18′N 119°51′E
- Pingniuweiyu Dao (坪牛尾屿岛) 26°18′N 119°53′E
- Sanyayu Dao (三牙屿岛) 26°17′N 119°54′E
- Shangjiaoyu Dao (上礁屿岛) 26°17′N 119°53′E
- Shujiaoyu Dao (鼠礁屿岛) 26°22′N 119°53′E
- Shukuai Yu (竖块屿) 26°18′N 119°51′E
- Yangtan Dao (洋潭岛) 26°21′N 119°53′E
- Yuanshanzaiyu Dao (圆山仔屿岛) 26°17′N 119°54′E
- Zhijiao Yu (指礁屿) 26°18′N 119°51′E

== Administrative divisions ==
Huangqi includes four residential communities and seven villages:

Four residential communities:

- Haifeng (海丰社区), Haixin (海新社区), Haiying (海英社区), Haijian (海建社区)

Seven villages:

- Changsha (Ch’ang-sha; 长沙村), Chi'ao / Chiwo (Ch’ih-ao; 赤澳村 / 赤沃村), Dajian (大建村), Chicai (赤才村), Houlun (后仑村 / 后𪨧村), Dagu (Ta-k’u [sic]; 大谷村), Gushi (古石村)

== Demographics ==
Historical population
Year	Pop.	±% p.a.
2000	24,130	—
2010	23,368	−0.32%

== Gallery ==
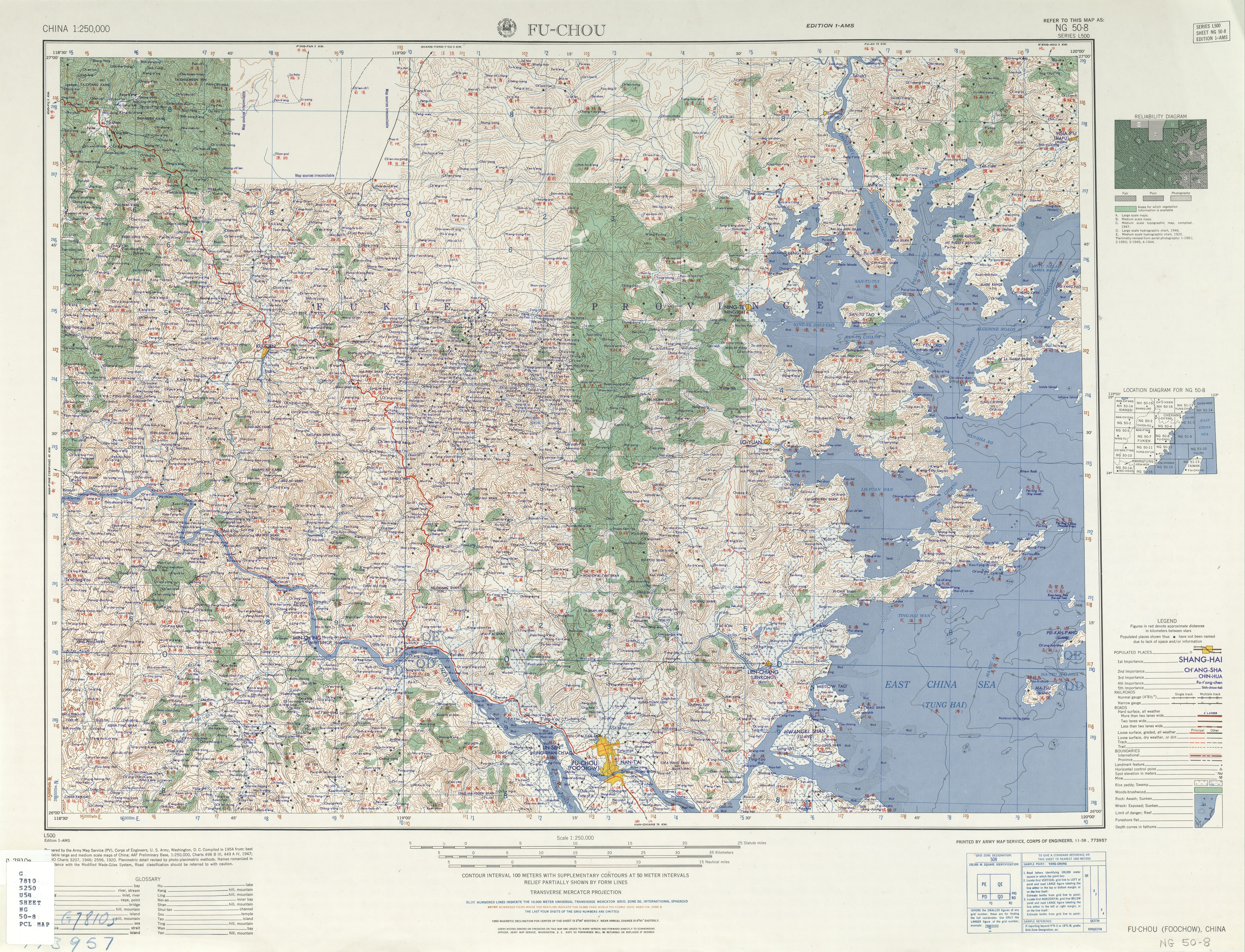
Map of the region including Huangqi (labeled as Huang-ch’i 黃岐) (AMS, 1954)

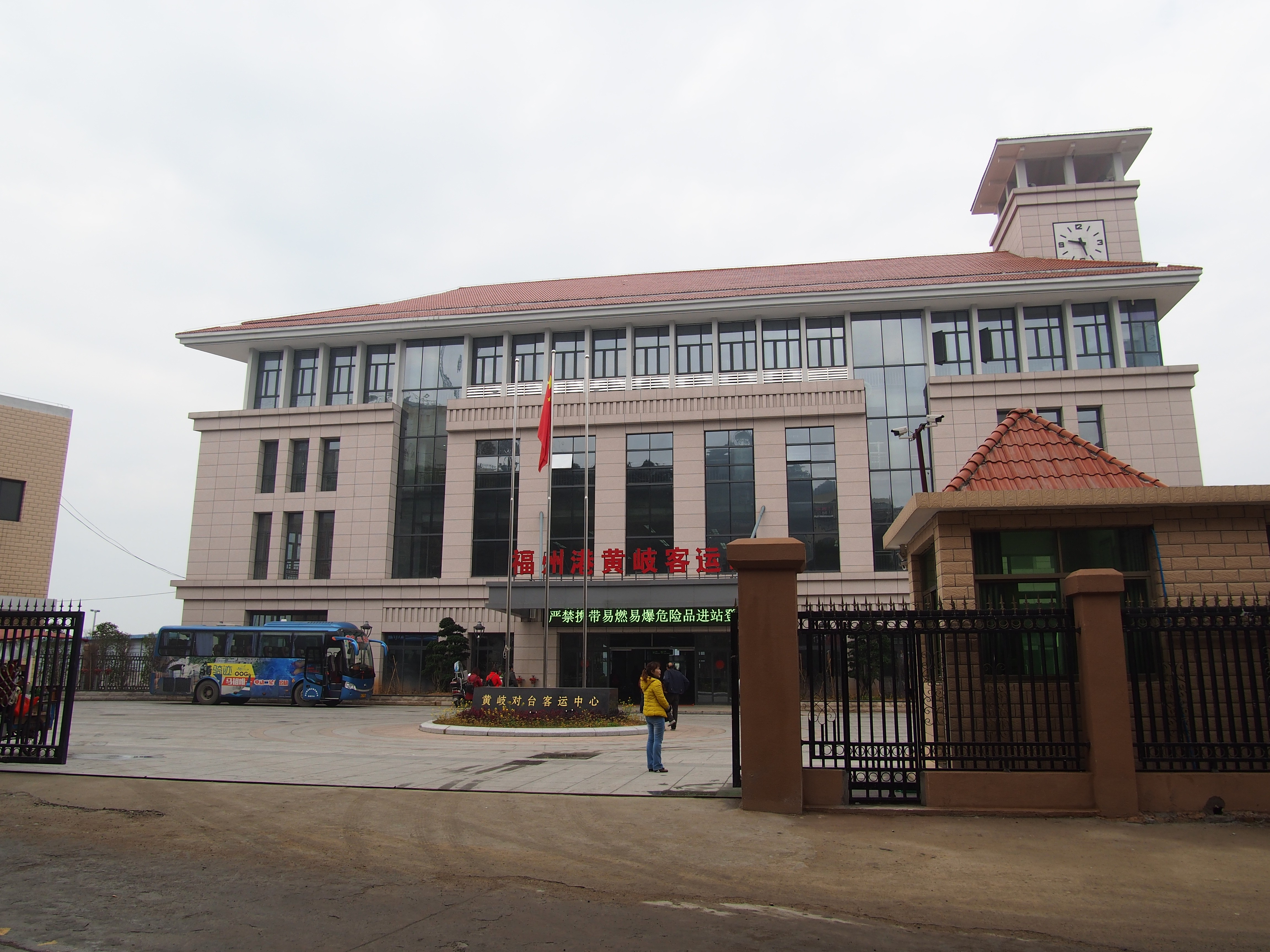
Huangqi Ferry Terminal (福州港黄岐客运站)

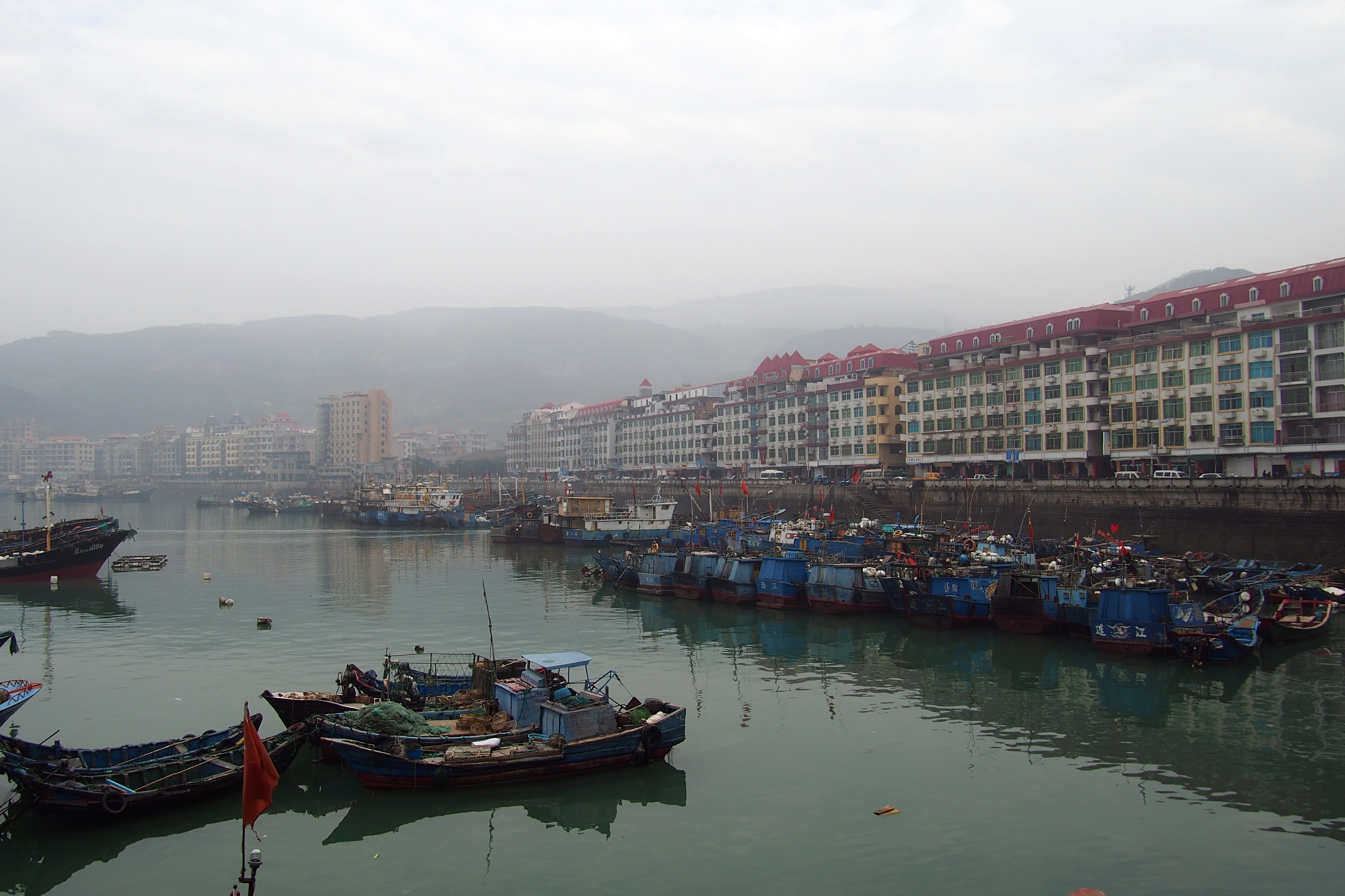
Huangqi Fishing Port (黄岐渔港)

== See also ==
- List of township-level divisions of Fujian
