= Tailu =

Tailu 苔菉镇 T’ai-lu
- Town
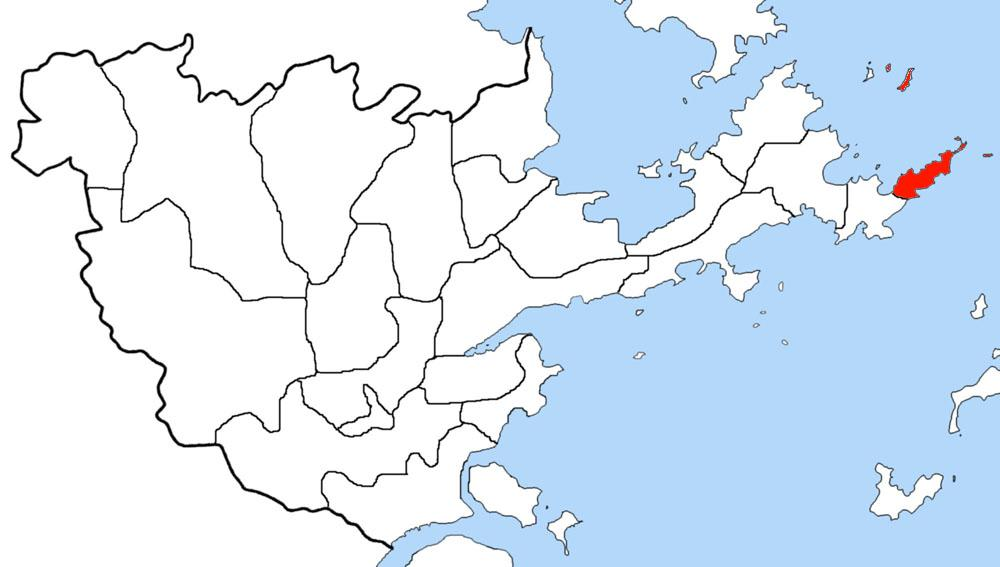
- Location in Lianjiang County

- Location in Fujian Tailu (China)
- Coordinates: 26.36°N 119.940278°E
- Country: China
- Province: Fujian
- Prefecture-level city: Fuzhou
- County: Lianjiang
- Seat: Tailu (苔菉村)
- Villages: 8

Area
  - Total: 7.7 km^{2} (3.0 sq mi)

Population (2010)
  - Total: 25,629
  - Density: 3,300/km^{2} (8,600/sq mi)
- Time zone: UTC+8 (China Standard)

Tailu (Chinese: 苔菉镇; pinyin: Táilù Zhèn) is a town in Lianjiang County, Fuzhou, Fujian, China. Tailu is located at the eastern tip of the Huangqi Peninsula (黄岐半岛) / Beijiao Peninsula (北茭半島) (including nearby islands) and is bordered to the west by the town of Huangqi and to the south by the East China Sea, across which Lienchiang County (the Matsu Islands), Taiwan (ROC) can be seen.

== History ==
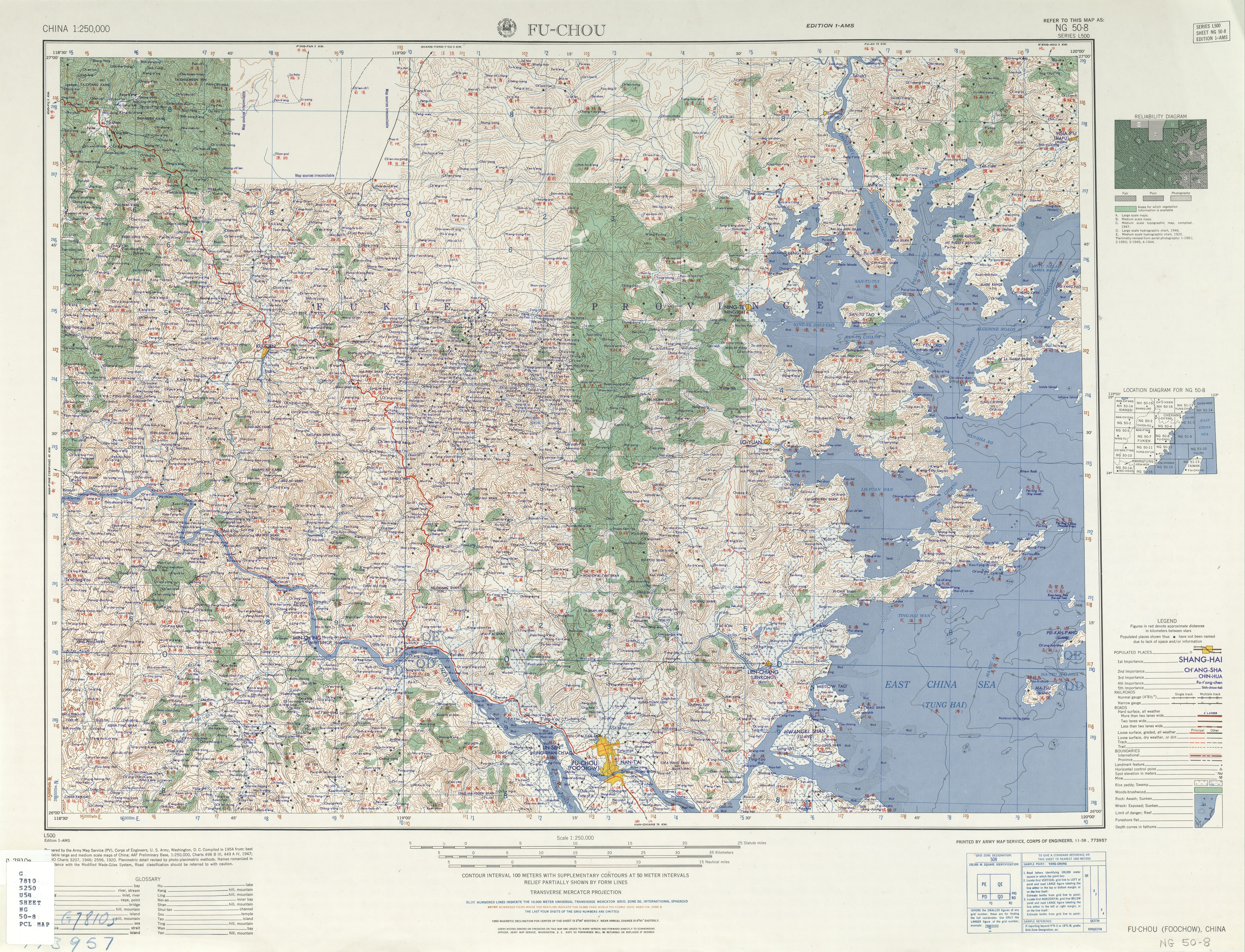
Map including Tailu (labeled as T’ai-lu) (AMS, 1954)

In April 1979, Tailu Commune (苔菉公社) was established from part of Huangqi Commune.

In June 1984, Tailu Commune became Tailu Township (苔菉乡).

In August 1992, Tailu Township became Tailu Town (苔菉镇).

In August 2004, a bus traveling from Tailu to Fuzhou crashed killing 17 and injuring 10.

On the morning of May 4, 2016, Jiaonan Village Branch Chinese Communist Party Secretary Liu Wenjian (刘文件) and Niujiao Community Assistant Manager Tsao Erh-Chang (曹爾章) met in Nangan Township, Lienchiang County (the Matsu Islands), Taiwan (ROC) and signed a memorandum of mutual exchange and cooperation. Others present included the Magistrate of Lienchiang County, ROC Liu Cheng-ying, Tailu Party Secretary Huang Duanming (黄端明), Nangan Township Mayor Chen Chen-Ko (陳振國) and others.

In February 2020, the Chinese (PRC) fishing vessel Minyun 60418 (閩運60418漁船) which had been fishing near Xiaoqiu (小坵) in Beigan Township, Lienchiang County (the Matsu Islands), ROC (Taiwan) floated to Tailu without its five man crew.

== Geography ==
Tailu is located at the northeastern tip of the Huangqi Peninsula (黄岐半岛) across from the Matsu Islands (Lienchiang County, ROC (Taiwan)).

Islands in Tailu include:

- Daniuyu Dao (大牛屿岛) 26°22′N 119°57′E
- Datan (大磹 / 大潭岛) 26°22′N 119°54′E
- Dongluo Dao (东洛岛) 26.415863°N 119.91044°E
- Guojiang Yu (过江岛) 26°25′N 119°54′E
- Guo Yu (Guoyu Dao; 过屿 / 过屿岛) 26.380204°N 119.94686°E
- Hengchengjiao Dao (横塍礁岛) 26°18′N 119°53′E
- Kedou Yu (蝌蚪屿) 26°22′N 119°58′E
- Nanliuyu Dao (南流屿岛) 26°21′N 119°56′E
- Nanwei Yu (Nanweiyu Dao; 南尾屿 / 南尾屿岛) 26°22′N 119°54′E
- Santan Dao (三潭岛) 26°22′N 119°53′E
- Shuangjiyu Dao / Shuangji Yu (双髻屿岛 / 雙髻嶼) 26°21′N 119°56′E
- Sitan Dao (四潭岛) 26°22′N 119°53′E
- Xiaoniujiaoyu Dao (小牛礁屿岛) 26°22′N 119°57′E
- Yang Yu (Yangyu Dao; 洋屿 / 洋屿岛) 26.36933°N 119.969543°E (site of Yangyu Lighthouse)
- Yangyue Dao (仰月岛) 26°22′N 119°56′E
- Zhiluo Dao (址洛 / 祉洛岛) 26.424587°N 119.897233°E

== Administrative divisions ==
Tailu includes eight villages:

- Beijiao (北茭村), Hengcheng (横塍村), Jiaonan (茭南村), Tailu (苔菉村), Dongluo (东洛村), Xiubang (秀邦村 / 琇邦村 / 琇⿰𤣩邦村), Shangtang (Shang-t’ang; 上塘村), Houwan (后湾村)

== Demographics ==
Historical population
Year	Pop.	±% p.a.
2000	27,301	—
2010	25,629	−0.63%

== See also ==
- List of township-level divisions of Fujian
