= China Airlines Flight 334 =

1986 aircraft hijacking

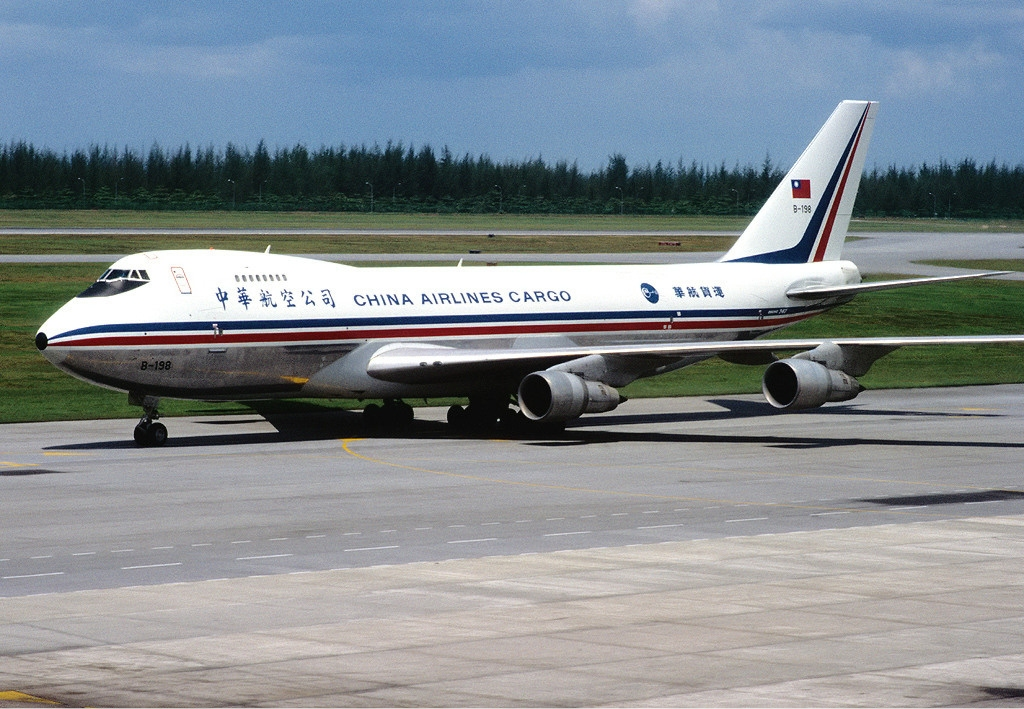
- B-198, the aircraft involved, at Changi Airport a year before the incident.

Hijacking
- Date: May 3, 1986
- Summary: Hijacking
- Site: Guangzhou Baiyun Airport, Guangdong, China

Aircraft
- Aircraft type: Boeing 747-2R7F/SCD
- Operator: China Airlines
- Call sign: DYNASTY 334
- Registration: B-198
- Flight origin: Changi Airport, Changi, Singapore
- 1st stopover: Don Mueang Airport, Bangkok, Thailand
- 2nd stopover: Kai Tak Airport, British Hong Kong
- Destination: Chiang Kai-shek Airport, Taoyuan, Taiwan
- Occupants: 3
- Passengers: 0
- Crew: 3
- Fatalities: 0
- Survivors: 3

China Airlines Flight 334 was a Boeing 747-2R7F/SCD freighter aircraft that was hijacked by pilot Wang Hsi-chueh (Chinese: 王錫爵), a former military U-2 pilot, on May 3, 1986, while en route from Don Mueang, Thailand to Hong Kong. Wang had left family members behind in China when he left for Taiwan in 1949 and had met some of them in Hong Kong in 1984. He decided to defect in order to reunite with his family in China. Wang managed to subdue the two other crew members and changed course to land the 747 in Guangzhou, where he defected to the People's Republic of China. The incident forced the Chiang Ching-kuo government in Taiwan to reverse its Three Noes policy in regard to contacting the communist government in mainland China, and Chiang dispatched several delegates to Hong Kong to negotiate with mainland officials for the return of the aircraft and crew. The incident was credited as a catalyst in renewing cross-strait relations between mainland China and Taiwan. It is the largest aircraft used to defect so far.

== Aircraft ==
The aircraft involved was a Boeing 747-2R7F/SCD freighter, (Note: The aircraft was a Boeing 747-200 model; Boeing assigns a unique code for each company that buys one of its aircraft, which was applied as a suffix to the model number at the time the aircraft was built. The Boeing code for Cargolux was "R7," hence B-198 was a "747-2R7". This aircraft was a freighter with a large door in its side for loading cargo, hence "747-2R7F/SCD" for Freighter/Side Cargo Door.) MSN 22390, registered as B-198, that was built by Boeing Commercial Airplanes in 1980. It was equipped with four Pratt & Whitney JT9D-7R4G2 engines. On December 29, 1991, this aircraft, later operating as China Airlines Flight 358, crashed into the side of a hill near Wanli, Taiwan after the separation of its number three and four engines, killing all five crew on board.

== Incident ==
The following times are all in the Beijing/Taipei/Hong Kong time zone (UTC+8).

=== May 3 ===
- 5:50 AM: Flight 334 took off from Singapore, headed for Bangkok.
- 2:40 PM: Flight 334 flew pass the IDOSI reporting point, about 120 nautical miles (220 km) to the southeast of Hong Kong. It followed orders from Hong Kong Air Traffic Control and descended from 33,000 feet (10,000 m).
- 2:45 PM: Wang Hsi-chueh (王錫爵) attacked Tung Kuang-hsing (董光興) with an emergency axe, and also subdued and handcuffed him.
- 2:50 PM: Chiu Ming-chih (邱明志; Qiū Míngzhì), who came back from the restroom, started to fight with Wang.
- 2:50 PM: Hong Kong ATC, upon discovering that China Airlines Flight 334 has not descended to the appropriate height, ordered it to descend.
- 3:00 PM: About 50 nmi (93 km) from Hong Kong FLIR, Wang began calling Guangzhou Baiyun airport control tower, to the surprise of Hong Kong ATC. The ATC staff requested the final landing destination. At this point the aircraft was at about 15,000 feet (4,600 m).
- 3:07 PM: Scheduled arrival time at Hong Kong Kai Tak; HK ATC observes the plane continued to fly north.
- 3:08 PM: Another crew member threatened to cause a dangerous situation on the plane. A stall warning was issued at altitude 4,500 feet (1,400 m) AMSL. Chiu raised the flaps, risking crashing into the sea.
- 3:13 PM: Wang received flight assistance through official Chinese civil aviation, who called Guangzhou Baiyun International Airport.
- 3:45–3:50 PM: Plane landed and pilots were apprehended, giving conflicting stories.

== Aftermath ==
The aircraft, its cargo, and the two crew who did not defect, the co-pilot and a technician, were turned over to Taiwanese authorities on May 24, 1986, at Hong Kong's Kai Tak airport. By forcing the ROC (Taiwan) to communicate with PRC (China), Flight 334 was the first step in the thawing of relations. It effectively ended the Three Noes policy and ultimately led to the reunification of families across the straits a year later and has led to officially establishing the Three Links that were originally outlined in a 1979 PRC proposal by 2008. In 1987, Taiwan officially ended martial law.

The accident aircraft in question, under flight number 358, would eventually crash after takeoff when the right side engines on the aircraft separated on December 29, 1991, killing all five crew on board.

Wang Hsi-chueh died in Beijing in February 2021.

== See also ==
- CAAC Flight 296, a flight hijacked 3 years earlier by Chinese nationals trying to defect to Taiwan, leading to the opening of relations between mainland China and South Korea.
