= Three Links =

1979 National People's Congress proposal

The Three Links or Three Linkages (Chinese: 三通; pinyin: sān tōng) was a 1979 proposal from the National People's Congress of the People's Republic of China (PRC) to open up postal, transportation (especially airline), and trade links between mainland China and Taiwan, with the goal of unifying Mainland China and Taiwan.

Before the establishment of the "Three Links", communication between the two sides were routed through intermediate destinations, primarily Hong Kong; Macau; Jeju, South Korea and Ishigaki, Okinawa Prefecture, Japan. The "Three Links" were officially established on 15 December 2008, with the commencement of direct flights, shipping and post.

== History ==
In December 1978, Deng Xiaoping and his supporters won the 3rd plenary session of the 11th Central Committee of the Chinese Communist Party, starting China's economic reform. This also began a new direction in the PRC's foreign policy. On January 1, 1979, Beijing proposed the Three Links of postal, commercial and transportation. It was also proposed together with the Four Exchanges, which included relatives, tourists, academic groups, cultural groups and sports representatives.

=== 1979–1986: ROC response ===
In response to the Three Links, Republic of China (ROC) President Chiang Ching-kuo established the Three Noes policy (Chinese: 三不政策; pinyin: Sān Bù Zhèngcè). When the United States broke diplomatic ties with the ROC in 1979, the PRC believed that it had complete leverage in convincing the ROC government to talk. President Chiang refused, reiterating that there were to be "no contact, no negotiation and no compromise" (不接觸，不談判，不妥協) with the PRC.

=== 1986–2000: Initial contact ===
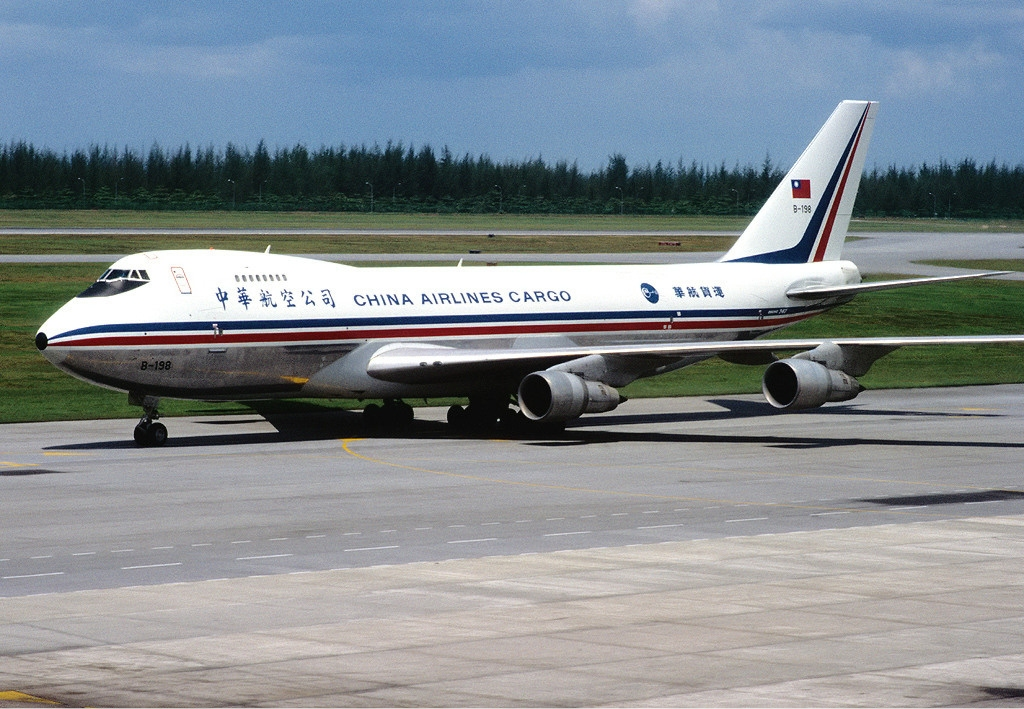
China Airlines Flight 334, whose hijacking led to the end of the policy

The hijacking of a China Airlines cargo plane on May 3, 1986, shattered the Three Noes policy. The pilot, Wang Shi-chuen, subdued the two other members of the flight crew and commandeered the plane to Guangzhou, forcing the ROC government to publicly send unofficial envoys to negotiate in Hong Kong with PRC officials over the return of the plane and the flight crew. The pilot, credited by the PRC for reestablishing contact between mainland China and Taiwan, received a hero's welcome in mainland China and became a senior PRC aviation official as well as serving as a so-called "Taiwanese delegate" to PRC government institutions.

During this time, many mainland China-born ROC armed forces veterans pressed President Chiang Ching-kuo to allow family reunions between the mainland Chinese who settled in Taiwan after the Chinese Civil War and their relatives in mainland China. President Chiang relented in 1987, authorizing the ROC Red Cross to issue permits allowing people from Taiwan to travel to mainland China only for family reunions. This started the ongoing regular civilian and unofficial exchanges between the PRC and the ROC. In July 1987, Chiang ended martial law in Taiwan, and residents of Taiwan were able to visit relatives in China that November. From June 1988, mail from Taiwan sent to Chinese addresses were routed through Hong Kong. Phone calls were routed through the United States, Japan and Singapore until 10 June 1989. Among the first direct calls placed to China were Taiwanese journalists asking about the 1989 Tiananmen Square protests and massacre.

While the PRC and ROC agreed in principle on opening the Three Links, there were overriding concerns. According to the Mainland Affairs Council (MAC) of the ROC, the major obstacle resided in the PRC's One-China position which does not recognize the sovereignty of the ROC. The Council stated that the Three links would only be considered when the PRC stopped its animosity against ROC sovereignty and improved the cross-strait relationship. The PRC government considers the cross-strait flights as domestic flights, according to the One China Policy. However, the ROC's Democratic Progressive Party government in Taiwan regarded this position the same as recognizing Taiwan (ROC) as a part of the PRC and thus would compromise the ROC sovereignty.

=== 2001–2007: Limited links ===
The previous administration led by President Chen Shui-bian, who was in power from 2000 to 2008, was keen to establish direct links under his "four noes and one without" pledge. China reacted with caution however, and was eventually infuriated when Chen spoke of "Taiwan and China on each side of the Taiwan Strait, each side is a country", and the Taiwanese administration believed establishment of the links would not be possible. However, China eventually shifted its position when it realized that the three links may be an opportunity to hold on to Taiwan, with its Minister of Transport and former Minister of Foreign Affairs Qian Qichen declaring that the "one China" principle would no longer be necessary during talks to establish the links, which would be labelled merely as "special cross-strait flights" and not "international" nor "domestic" flights.

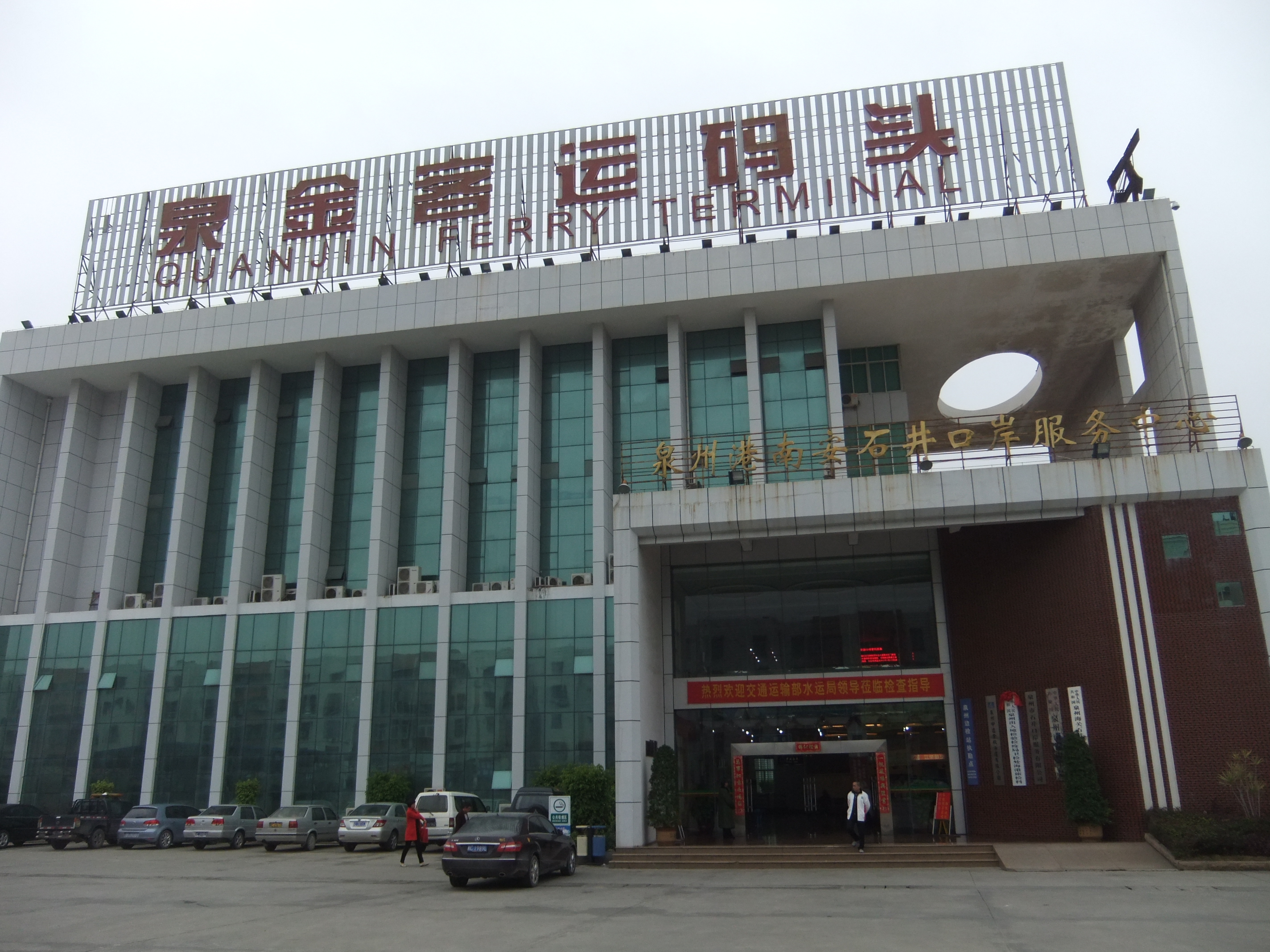
The mainland China terminal for the Quanzhou-Kinmen ferry, in Shijing Town

Under the Democratic Progressive Party (DPP) government, gradual steps were taken to lift restrictions on the three links. The so-called Little Three Links, also referred to as Mini Three Links or Three Small Links (小三通; xiǎo sān tōng) allows for limited postal, transportation, and trade links between the People's Republic of China's Fujian province cities of Xiamen, Mawei and Quanzhou, and the islands of Kinmen and Matsu, which are administered by the Republic of China. When introduced in January 2001, they allowed only those with household registrations in Kinmen and Matsu to use the trade links, as well as China-based Taiwan businessmen. Travels must be done in groups. Restrictions were lifted to allow individual travelers, as well as to open the routes to former residents and relatives of Kinmen and Matsu. Quanzhou was also added to the list in the same year. The ferry trip, which takes at least 30 minutes, involved regular routes connecting Kinmen to the ports of Xiamen and Quanzhou, and Matsu to Mawei. Occasional trips were also made between Kinmen and Meizhou, a popular religious site. The routes saw 21,377 entries and exits in 2001. It ballooned to 341,152 in 2006, but still represents a small part of overall trade.

In May 2002, a China Airlines flight to Hong Kong crashed into the Taiwan strait killing all 225 people on board. The majority of the passengers were intending to transfer at Hong Kong for flights to mainland China. Relatives of the victims advocated for direct cross-strait flights. In early 2003, the Republic of China (ROC) government permitted its air carriers to ferry Chinese New Year passengers back and forth across the Strait by way of "indirect charter flights" that touched down briefly in Hong Kong or Macau. The ROC and People's Republic of China (PRC) did not repeat the charter flights during the 2004 Chinese New Year, in part because the two sides could not agree on the terms for meetings to discuss how PRC carriers might also participate. In 2004, Beijing proposed a cross-strait controlled-access highway project linking Beijing to Taipei connecting the two sides of the Taiwan Straits together. However, due to the potential technical difficulties, some people in Taipei consider this move as political propaganda. The Three Links are mentioned in the Anti-Secession Law of the People's Republic of China.

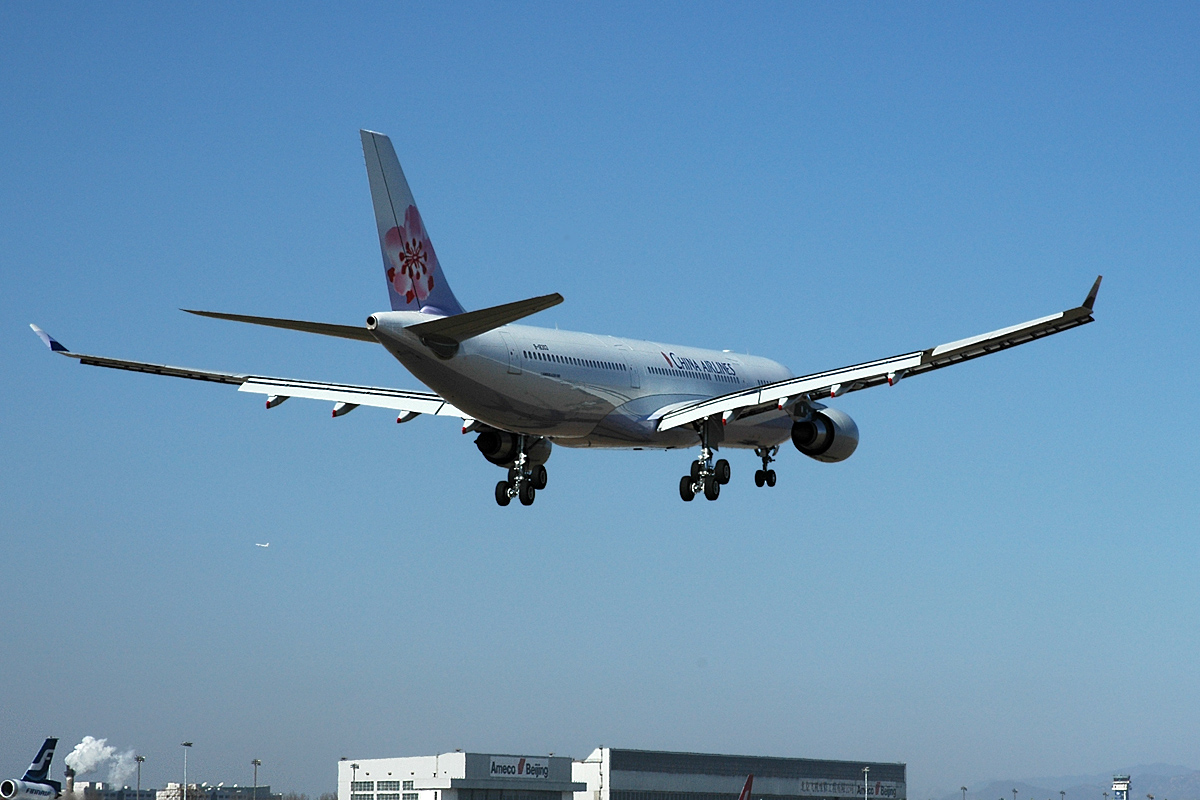
On January 29, 2005, China Airlines flight CAL581 landed in Beijing, People's Republic of China.

The two sides agreed to permit cross-strait flights for the Chinese New Year of Rooster in 2005. Unlike the 2003 flights, the 2005 flights did not have to touch down in Hong Kong or Macau, but still must enter its airspace. The first direct commercial flights from China (from Guangzhou) to Taiwan since 1949 arrived in Taipei on January 29, 2005. Shortly afterwards, a China Airlines carrier landed in Beijing. Airports on both sides saw ceremonial displays on the arrival of the first passengers, with dancing lions and dragons, and officials making speeches. For the three-week holiday period, 48 flights were scheduled. On 19 July 2006, the first direct chartered all-cargo flight since 1949 operated by China Airlines landed in Shanghai from Taipei. Four other flights were operated on 25 July, 30 July, 8 August, and 10 August 2006.

In the lead-up to the 2008 presidential elections in Taiwan, the Kuomintang candidate, Ma Ying-jeou, pledged opening the Three Links at an accelerated rate should he be elected president. The ruling DPP has traditionally been reluctant to implement this, citing the PRC's refusal to negotiate unless the Taiwanese counterparty accepts the one-China principle under the 1992 consensus. In June 2007, DPP presidential candidate Frank Hsieh criticised Ma's plans as a reflection of his lack of experience in handling cross-strait affairs. He also stressed that while the direct links may benefit Taiwan economically, Taiwan's values must not be compromised as a result.

=== 2008: Full establishment ===
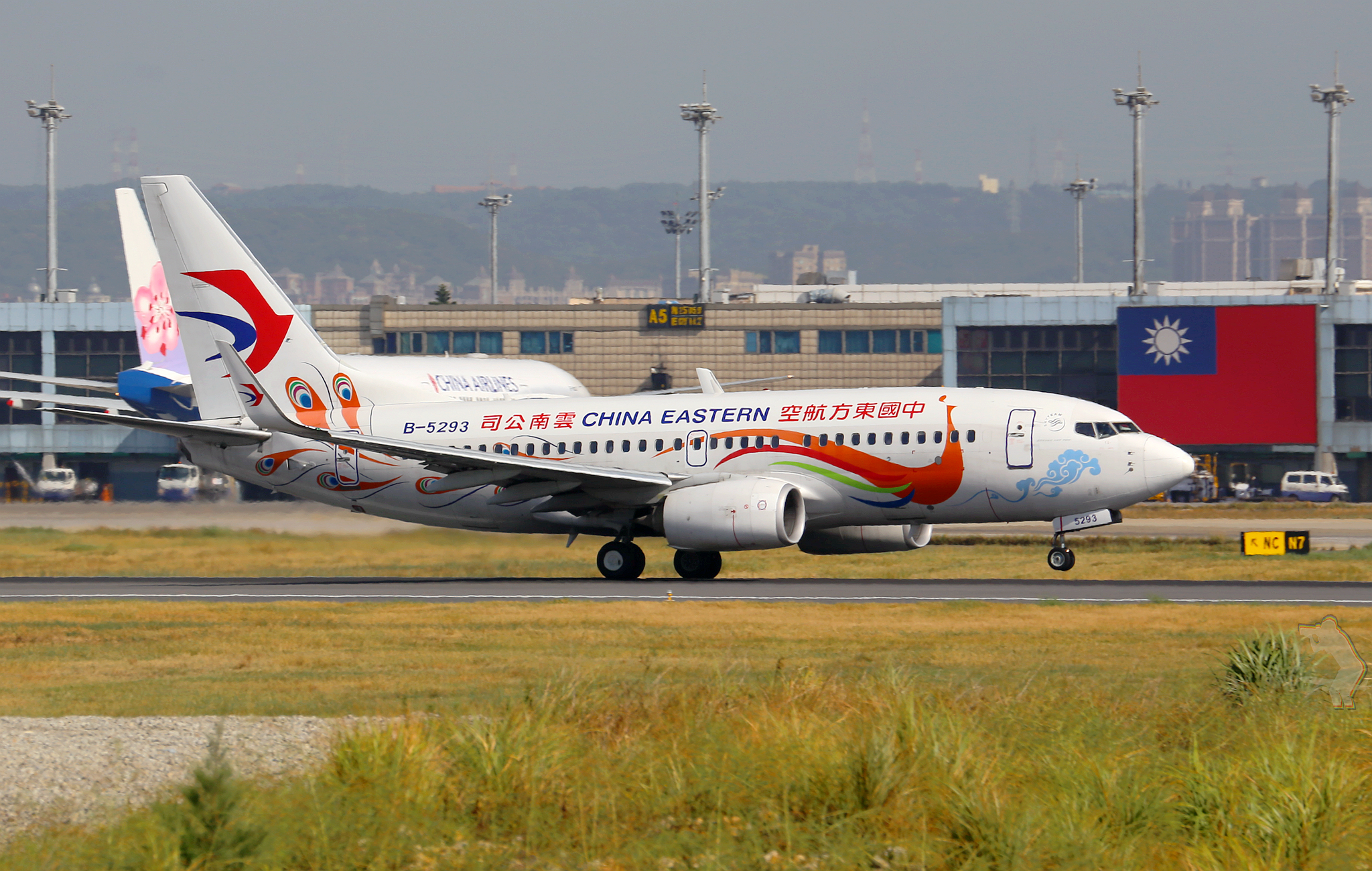
China Eastern aircraft in Taiwan in 2017

President Ma Ying-jeou later established a new "three noes" policy as part of his foreign policy towards the PRC:

- No unification with the PRC in the short-term
- No declaration of independence
- No use of force

On 29 February 2008, Ma announced plans to commence weekend charter flights by 1 July 2008, which will be expanded to daily charters by the end of the year. Regular scheduled flights may commence by June 2009. The airports of Taoyuan, Taipei, Taichung, Kaohsiung, Hualien, Taitung, and Penghu will be open for these cross-strait flights, while the seaports of Keelung, Taipei, Taichung, Kaohsiung, Hualien, Chiayi, and Tainan will be open to direct shipping routes. All restrictions limiting the scope of the "mini three links" will be lifted, including allowing all Taiwanese to use them. Hsieh responded by promising to expand cross-strait charter flights within three months after taking office, including increased flight frequencies and the addition of destinations on the Chinese which may be flown to. Both liberalization plans were greeted by enthusiasm amongst Taiwanese airlines.

Formal agreements to launch regular weekend charter flights were signed on 13 June 2008, allowing for an initial 36 return flights per weekend from Friday to Monday, divided equally to allow 18 return flights amongst up to six China-based and six Taiwan-based airlines respectively. The agreement will involve five airports from China, including those in Beijing, Shanghai, Guangzhou, Xiamen and Nanjing, and eight airports in Taiwan, namely Taipei Taoyuan International Airport, Kaohsiung International Airport, Taichung Airport, Taipei Songshan Airport, Makung Airport, Hualien Airport, Kinmen Airport and Taitung Airport. Flights to China cities of Chengdu, Chongqing, Hangzhou, Dalian, Guilin and Shenzhen may be added later. The first flights are scheduled to commence on 4 July 2008, and flight frequencies may be increased on demand, with expectations to increase to 72 each weekend after the 2008 Olympic Games. For the first time, the flights will be open to anyone holding valid travel documents, and will no longer be restricted to Chinese and Taiwanese residents only, and no longer required to fly through the Hong Kong FIR. There are also frequency caps on certain sectors: flights from Shanghai to Taiwan are capped at nine return trips each week, while those from China to Taichung must not exceed six return flights each week. There will be no restrictions out of Nanjing.

On 17 June 2008, the Civil Aviation Administration of China announced that the 18 return flights available to Chinese airlines will be apportioned such that Air China and Hainan Airlines will fly to Taiwan from Beijing with four return flights and two return flights respectively; China Eastern Airlines and Shanghai Airlines will fly from Shanghai to Taiwan with four return flights and two return flights respectively; China Southern Airlines fly depart for Taiwan from Guangzhou for four return flights per week, and Xiamen Airlines will connect Xiamen with Taiwan with two weekly return flights. Allocation amongst Taiwanese carriers was adjusted from six airlines to five after the suspension of Far Eastern Air Transport. A rotating allocation system was adopted, whereby in the first week, Mandarin Airlines, TransAsia Airways and UNI Air would fly four return flights each and China Airlines and EVA Airways will fly three flights each, and in the second week, four flights will be operated by TransAsia Airways, UNI Air and China Airlines, while EVA Airways and Mandarin Airlines will fly three flights. The rights will be rotated through in subsequent weeks such that each airline will fly in aggregate the same number of flights every five weeks. On the Taiwan-Shanghai route, three airlines will be allocated two roundtrip flights each week, and another airline one weekly flight, to be cycled through the five airlines. China Airlines and its subsidiary Mandarin Airlines would fly seven round-trips a week, with four to Shanghai, two to Beijing and one to Guangzhou from Kaohsiung, Makung, Taichung and Taipei. Eva Air and subsidiary UNI Air would fly from Taiwan Taoyuan, Songshan and Kaohsiung to Shanghai, Beijing and Guangzhou, while TransAsia Airways will operate from Songshan to Shanghai, Guangzhou and Xiamen. China Airlines and its Mandarin Airlines subsidiary would offer 29 return flights in the month of July to Shanghai, Beijing, Guangzhou and Xiamen, while Eva Air would offer 7 flights per week initially from Taiwan Taoyuan and Songshan airports.

Announced routes so far are as follows:

Announced Cross-straits flights
Airline	Chinese airport	Taiwanese airport	Flights per week (Week commencing 4 July 2008)	Aircraft	Remarks
Air China	Beijing Capital International Airport	Taiwan Taoyuan International Airport	2 (Fridays and Sundays)		
Air China	Shanghai Pudong International Airport	Taiwan Taoyuan International Airport	2 (Fridays and Sundays)		
(Taiwan) China Airlines	Beijing Capital International Airport	Taiwan Taoyuan International Airport			
(Taiwan) China Airlines	Shanghai Pudong International Airport	Taiwan Taoyuan International Airport			
China Eastern Airlines	Shanghai Pudong International Airport	Taiwan Taoyuan International Airport	1 (Sundays)	Airbus A321	
China Eastern Airlines	Shanghai Pudong International Airport	Taipei Songshan Airport	2 (Mondays and Fridays)	Airbus A321	
China Eastern Airlines	Nanjing Lukou International Airport	Taipei Songshan Airport	1 (Fridays)	Airbus A321	
(Taiwan) Mandarin Airlines	Xiamen Gaoqi International Airport	Makung Airport		Embraer 190	
(Taiwan) Mandarin Airlines	Xiamen Gaoqi International Airport	Taichung Airport		Embraer 190	
(China) Shanghai Airlines	Shanghai Pudong International Airport	Taipei Songshan Airport	2 (Fridays and Sundays)	Boeing 767-300ER	First flight to commence

Negotiators are expected to meet again in Taiwan to tackle outstanding issues, including revisiting the issue of introducing cross-strait charter cargo flights within three months, the introduction of direct flight routes without the need to fly via Hong Kong airspace and subsequent addition of destinations and frequencies.

On 19 June 2008, the "Little Three Links" between the islands of Kinmen and Matsu and Fujian was greatly liberalised, allowing any Taiwanese to use the ferry services by travelling to either island on their onward journey into Fujian province and beyond. In response, several Taiwanese airlines increased flights to Kinmen, including Mandarin Airlines (increased Taipei-Kinmen flights), Trans Asia Airways (an additional weekly Taipei-Kinmen flight) and UNI Airways Corporation (increase Taipei-Kinmen flights by one or two each week, for a total of 24 weekly flights). Still, the sudden surge in travellers caused flights to become overbooked in the immediate aftermath of liberalization. There were calls for further relaxation on travel restrictions of Chinese travelling into the islands so as to enable them to also travel onwards to the main island. Work was also needed to correct the current trade and movement imbalance, where 300,000 Taiwanese travel via the route to reach China, compared to 37,000 Chinese who travel in the opposite direction. On the other hand, the volume of Chinese goods using the route was significantly higher compared to Taiwanese goods. The MAC Minister Lai Shin-yuan remarked that the Straits Exchange Foundation will negotiate with Association for Relations Across the Taiwan Straits to allow the Chinese to travel to Taiwan via the route, and to lift a US$100,000 trade value ceiling imposed by the Chinese on Taiwanese goods using the route.

Audio of Taipei Control requesting TransAsia flight 332 to change frequency to Shanghai Control

Full establishment of the Three Links officially commenced on 15 December 2008, with inaugural direct shipping, direct flights, and direct mail. On August 31, 2009, the number of flights between China and Taiwan increased to 270. They no longer had to bypass Hong Kong airspace and also were no longer all operating as chartered flights; i.e., a large number of regular scheduled flights began to cross the Taiwan Strait out of 25 Chinese airports.

== Controversies ==
During the period of the direct charter flights, the PRC state media stressed that they were domestic flights, whereas the ROC government stressed that they were international flights.

In reaction to 13 June 2008 agreements, the DPP criticized the government of "yielding to China", and accused Straits Exchange Foundation Chairman Chiang Pin-kung of "defying the legislature", saying the "Act Governing Relations between the People of the Taiwan Area and the Mainland Area stipulates that legislative resolutions are required before any direct cross-strait links are opened", which was not carried out. Chiang dismissed the accusations, saying he followed the precedent set by former SEF chairman Koo Chen-fu, and would "report to the legislature's Home and Nations Committee instead of the legislative caucuses".

The DPP and the Pan-Green Coalition has routinely claimed there was a potential compromise on Taiwan's national security should there be liberal three links, suggesting the PRC could disguise troop carriers as commercial aircraft to invade Taiwan, a charge met by criticism from both the PRC and the Pan-Blue Coalition. In the wake of 13 June 2008 agreements, the DPP raised the issue of national security again, criticising its plans to open up to eight airports when China would open only five. The eight airports included Hualien and Taitung, which also operate as military airfields, thus creating a security threat. They also expressed concern over the possibility of absconding Chinese tourists. A defense ministry report on 18 May 2008 concluded that direct charter flights would be a national security threat, and the air force has reportedly expressed concern that six of the airports except the Taiwan Taoyuan and Kaohsiung airports have military installations and aircraft. The Vice Minister of National Defense Lin Chen-yi has further recommended to maintain indirect flight routes via a third party's air space on 23 May 2008. But on 18 June 2008, the Minister of National Defense Chen Chao-min declared that direct flights without the involvement of any third party air space would not pose a threat to national security, saying "The final routes for direct charter flights shall be decided by the Mainland Affairs Council and the Ministry of Transportation and Communications. We will submit recommendations to the MOTC that take national security into consideration, but I do not foresee any problems if the flights travel directly between Taiwan and China".

The DPP gave itself credit for having "laid the groundwork" for opening weekend charter flights and allowing Chinese tourists into Taiwan, both of which did not occur under KMT rule, and criticised the current negotiators as being "inexperienced and ill-prepared".

== Impact ==
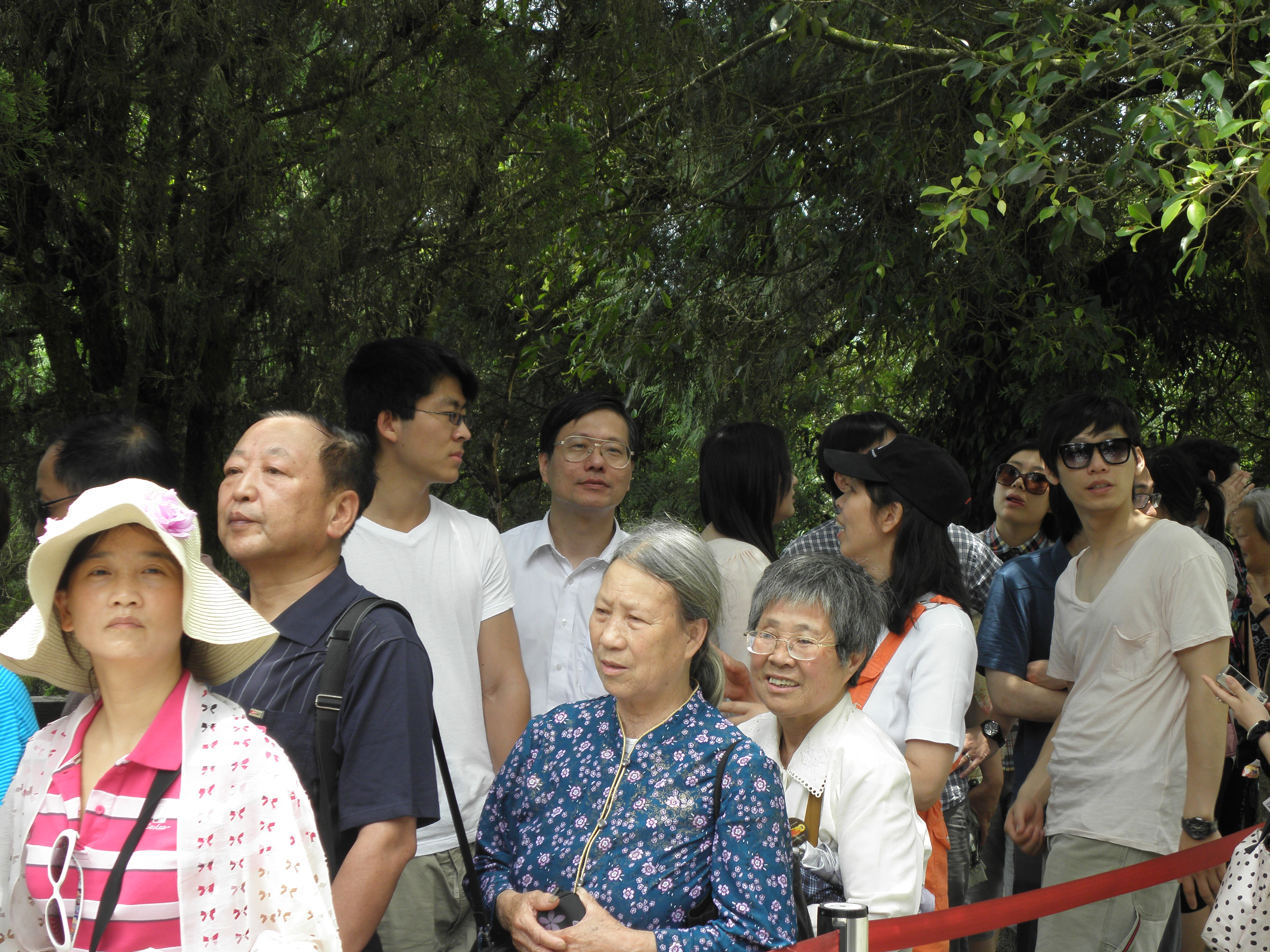
Communist Chinese visitors in the Republic

Visitor data from Taiwan's Mainland Affairs Council indicates that the China-Taiwan aviation market is about 8 million passengers annually just prior to the June 2008 agreements, and may be expected to immediately increase to 10 million as a result of liberalization. IATA's figures puts the market figure at about 6 million passengers annually based on number of air tickets issued, with the Shanghai-Taipei pair accounting for 40% of the entire market. The ten biggest markets are as follows:

Top ten city-pairs on the cross-Strait aviation market (one-way China to Taiwan traffic figures)
Chinese port	Taiwanese port	2005	2006	2007
Shanghai	Taipei	1,056,000	1,179,000	1,249,000
Beijing	Taipei	227,000	257,000	274,000
Shanghai	Kaohsiung	167,000	183,000	198,000
Xiamen	Taipei	149,000	141,000	134,000
Hangzhou	Taipei	65,000	100,000	104,000
Nanjing	Taipei	61,000	92,000	84,000
Fuzhou	Taipei	71,000	74,000	72,000
Guangzhou	Taipei	70,000	61,000	69,000
Shenzhen	Taipei	81,000	99,000	55,000

=== Transit points ===
The enforcement of the ban on direct trade links has benefited third party transit points, in particular Hong Kong, since 1988. Current China-Taiwan traffic channels about 60% of its traffic via Hong Kong, 30% via Macau, and the rest via other points such as Jeju. In 1997, the Taipei-Hong Kong air route alone constituted one-sixth of the passengers handled at the Hong Kong Airport with five million passengers, and by 2001, this figure has jumped to 6.7 million. In the fiscal year 2006–07, the Taipei-Hong Kong air route accounted for 18% of Hong Kong's 45 million passengers, making it one of the busiest international air routes by passenger numbers in the world.

1.6 million air travelers flew into China from Hong Kong in 1996, and in 2000, 18% of Hong Kong's 2.4 million tourists came from Taiwan, out of which 36% of them traveled on to China with or without staying in Hong Kong. In the five-year period from 2003 to 2007 there were an average of 3.68 million passengers annually who travel through Hong Kong between the two locations. Today, about 60% of Taiwan-Hong Kong traffic connects onwards to flights into the Chinese, and for the Macau-Taiwan sector, about 80%.

Currently, over 3,000 flights offering nearly one million seats are operated every month by five airlines, namely China Airlines, Cathay Pacific, Dragonair, EVA Air and Thai Airways International, between Hong Kong and Taipei. In addition, flights are operated between Hong Kong and Kaohsiung by China Airlines, Dragonair and Mandarin Airlines, and between Hong Kong and Taichung by Dragonair, Hong Kong Express Airways, Mandarin Airlines and Uni Air. Summary of flights through Hong Kong and Macau are as follows:

Cross-straits flights between Taiwan and Hong Kong/Macau
Airline	Third destination airport	Taiwanese airport	Flights per week (Week commencing 16 June 2008)	Remarks
Cathay Pacific	Hong Kong International Airport	Taipei Taoyuan International Airport	108	
China Airlines	Hong Kong International Airport	Taipei Taoyuan International Airport	93	
Dragonair	Hong Kong International Airport	Taipei Taoyuan International Airport	28	
EVA Air	Hong Kong International Airport	Taipei Taoyuan International Airport	56	
Thai Airways International	Hong Kong International Airport	Taipei Taoyuan International Airport	7	Through-traffic from Bangkok only
China Airlines	Hong Kong International Airport	Kaohsiung International Airport	12	
Dragonair	Hong Kong International Airport	Kaohsiung International Airport	35	
Mandarin Airlines	Hong Kong International Airport	Kaohsiung International Airport	17	
Dragonair	Hong Kong International Airport	Taichung Airport	7	
Hong Kong Express Airways	Hong Kong International Airport	Taichung Airport	7	
Mandarin Airlines	Hong Kong International Airport	Taichung Airport	14	
Uni Air	Hong Kong International Airport	Taichung Airport	11	
Air Macau	Macau International Airport	Taipei Taoyuan International Airport	56	
EVA Air	Macau International Airport	Taipei Taoyuan International Airport	28	
TransAsia Airways	Macau International Airport	Taipei Taoyuan International Airport	42	
Air Macau	Macau International Airport	Kaohsiung International Airport	18	
EVA Air	Macau International Airport	Kaohsiung International Airport	14	
TransAsia Airways	Macau International Airport	Kaohsiung International Airport	14	

Conversely, liberation of the three links may have adverse economic consequences on Hong Kong. The Hong Kong Airport Authority's chairman Victor Fung Kwok-king estimated up to 6% reduction in air travel through Hong Kong as a result of direct China-Taiwan flights. The city's tourism operators estimated losses of over HK$3 billion annually should the three links be liberated in 2008. A possible 6.6% reduction in tourism in Hong Kong may be limited in economic impact as transit passengers typically spend far less during transit, but it may have significant impact on Hong Kong-based airlines, in particular Cathay Pacific and its affiliate Dragonair. It was reported on 18 May 2008 that Taiwan's China Airlines intents to trim its Taiwan-Hong Kong flights by two to three flights per day once direct flights resume in July 2008, but the airline denied this, saying "when cross-strait relations improve and market trends are clearer, then we'll make a specific plan". Chinese Premier Wen Jiabao believes Hong Kong will not be affected as the increased economic exchange may benefit the city too. In the immediate aftermath of the announcements for 4 July direct flights, shares of Cathay Pacific fell by 1.8% over fears of its negative impact on the airline, which derives significant profits from the route. Shares of Xiamen Gaoqi International Airport and Shanghai Airlines gained 1.18% and 1.27% respectively over expectations of possible gains from the deal.

=== Air services ===
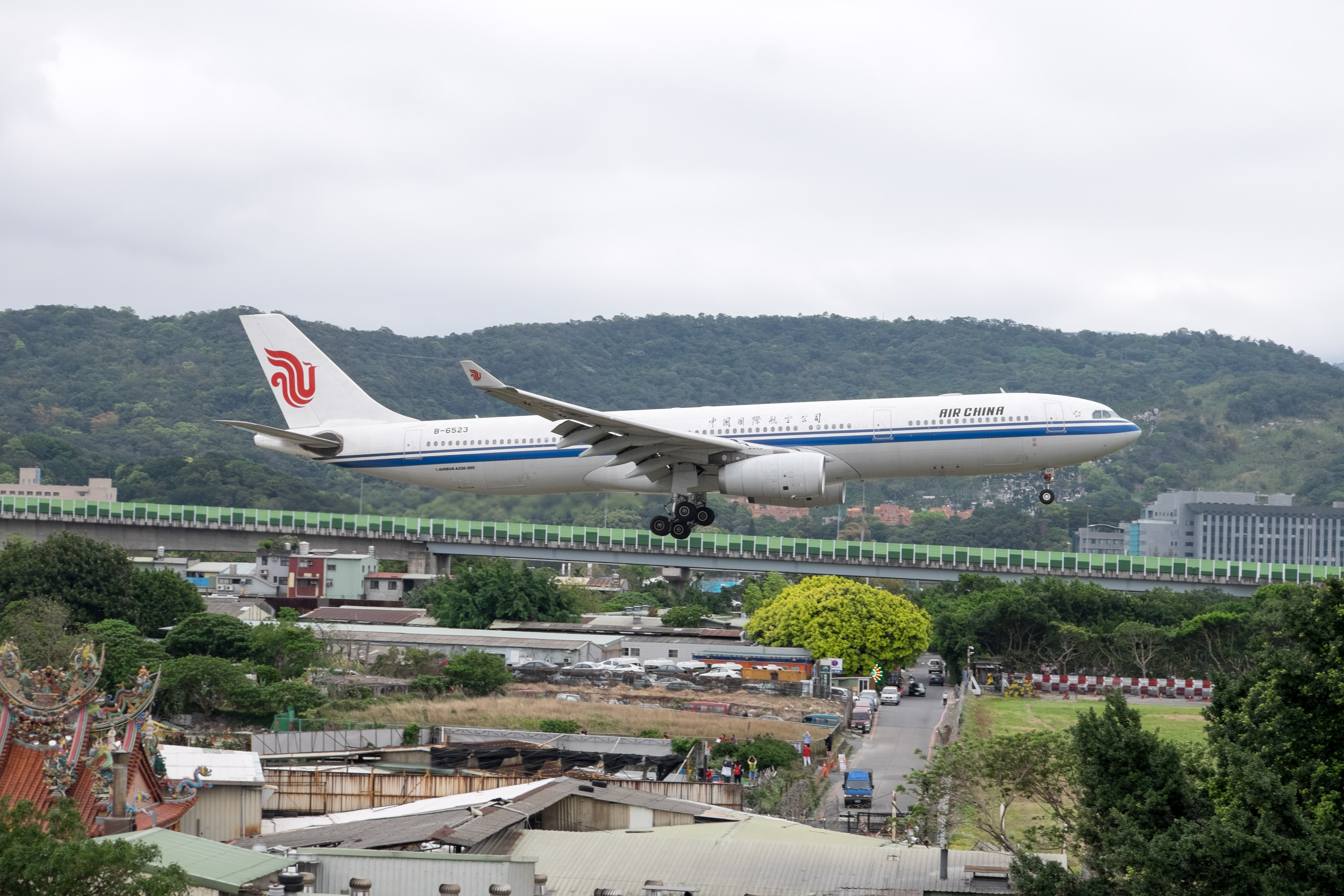
Air China – the flag carrier of the PRC — is required to cover the PRC flag painted on the body of their aircraft when flying to Taiwan.

Gradual liberalization has paved the way for direct cooperation between airlines from both sides. China Southern Airlines and China Airlines announced their intention to seal a strategic cooperation contract on 23 June 2008 for cooperation on the weekend chartered flights, soon after the announcement of their liberalization. Officials from each of the three largest Chinese airlines also flew to Taiwan with attempts to negotiate with Taiwanese airlines on cooperation deals, with likely cooperation between all parties in areas including marketing, ground services, maintenance and airline catering.

The impending competition also prompted the main Chinese airlines to embark on a publicity blitz, highlighting their intentions to provide their best aircraft, crew and service to passengers, including customized in-flight meals to suit tastes from both sides.

Announced ticket prices for the first flights were shown to be almost similar to those requiring a stopover, negating expectations of the direct flights depressing ticket prices except on the Xiamen-Taipei route. This was due to high fuel costs, but prices were not expected to rise further.

=== Ship routes ===
In December 2015, the Huangqi-Matsu ship route was introduced as part of the Mini Three Links.

== See also ==
- History of the Republic of China
- Chinese unification
- Anti-Secession Law of the People's Republic of China
- Political status of Taiwan
- Politics of Taiwan
- Taiwan independence
