= Retrocession of Taiwan =

Transfer of Taiwan and Penghu from Japan to the Republic of China in 1945

- Part of World War II
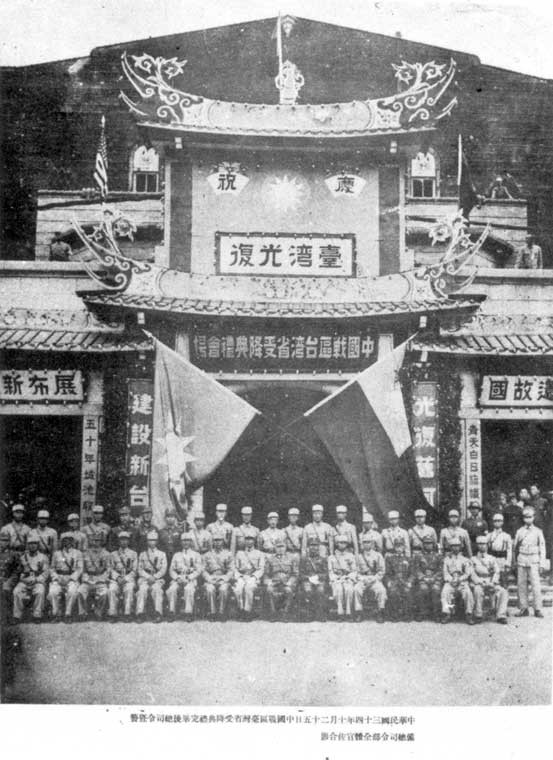
- Surrender ceremony in Taipei
- Native name: 臺灣光復
- Date: 25 October 1945
- Outcome: Taiwan came under control of the Republic of China

Chinese name
- Traditional Chinese: 臺灣光復
- Simplified Chinese: 台湾光复
Transcriptions
Standard Mandarin
- Hanyu Pinyin: Táiwān Guāngfù
- Wade–Giles: T‘ai^{2}-wan^{1} Kuang^{1}-fu^{4}

Japanese name
- Kanji: 台湾光復
- Hiragana: たいわんこうふく

On 25 October 1945, Japan handed over Taiwan and Penghu to the Republic of China, as a result of World War II. This marked the end of Japanese rule and the beginning of post-war era of Taiwan. This event was referred to by the Republic of China as the retrocession of Taiwan (臺灣光復). The Republic of China government viewed this as the restoration of Chinese sovereignty over Taiwan, following its cession to Japan in 1895 after the Qing dynasty's defeat in the First Sino-Japanese War. Therefore, the event was named "retrocession". The notion of "retrocession" of Taiwan has been controversial among those who debate the legal status of the islands, especially since the democratisation of Taiwan in the 1990s.

On 15 August 1945, Japan announced its surrender in World War II. On 2 September, Douglas MacArthur, Supreme Commander of the Allied Powers, issued General Order No. 1, instructing Japanese forces in various locations to surrender to the Allies. The order specified that Japanese troops in Taiwan were to surrender to the Chinese leader Chiang Kai-shek. Chiang delegated He Yingqin as his plenipotentiary for the surrender process, who further appointed Chen Yi to oversee the surrender in Taiwan. The Governor-General of Taiwan and Commander of the Japanese 10th Area Army, Rikichi Andō, on behalf of Japan, surrendered to Chen Yi at the Taipei Public Hall on 25 October, signing the documents to formalise the transfer.

The date of the handover is annually celebrated as the Retrocession Day, which was a public holiday in Taiwan from 1946 to 2000, and again from 2025. The day has also been marked as a memorial day in mainland China since 2025.

== Background ==
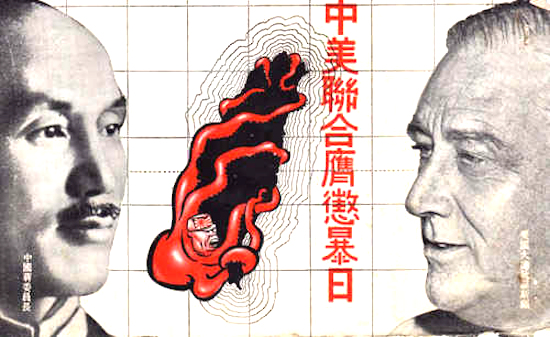
Chinese propaganda poster featured portraits of Chiang Kai-shek and Franklin D. Roosevelt, where the Japanese military was depicted as an octopus entrenched on the island of Taiwan

The Qing dynasty ceded Taiwan to Japan in 1895 under the Treaty of Shimonoseki following its defeat in the First Sino-Japanese War. The 1911 Revolution brought about the fall of the Qing dynasty and the establishment of the Republic of China.

Japanese aggression escalated into full-scale conflict after the Marco Polo Bridge Incident in 1937, drawing the Republic of China into the Second Sino-Japanese War. Following the attack on Pearl Harbor in 1941, the Republic of China officially joined the Allies in World War II. The Republic of China sought Allied agreement for Japan to relinquish Taiwan and return its sovereignty to China after the war. This intention was included in the Cairo Declaration and reiterated in the Potsdam Proclamation, which called for the fulfilment of these terms.

It is their purpose that Japan shall be stripped of all the islands in the Pacific which she has seized or occupied since the beginning of the first World War in 1914, and that all the territories Japan has stolen from the Chinese, such as Manchuria, Formosa, and The Pescadores, shall be restored to the Republic of China.

— 1943 Cairo Declaration

The terms of the Cairo Declaration shall be carried out and Japanese sovereignty shall be limited to the islands of Honshu, Hokkaido, Kyushu, Shikoku and such minor islands as we determine.

— 1945 Potsdam Declaration

== Government plans ==
On 17 April 1944, the Chinese Nationalist government in Chongqing, through the Kuomintang's Central Design Bureau, established the Taiwan Investigation Committee. Chen Yi, who had participated in the 40th Anniversary Commemorative Taiwan Expo, was appointed as the head. Initially, no Taiwanese members were part of the committee, but in September, several Taiwanese members were added. In May 1944, the Central Design Bureau divided the Chinese territory into three zones: the rear zone, the recovered zone, and the retroceded zone, with Taiwan and Manchuria being the retroceded zone.

With the end of the war, the Nationalist government debated two plans for Taiwan: a normal Chinese province or a special administration area with additional military authorities. Chiang Kai-shek, upon the suggestion of Chen Yi, turned Taiwan into a Chinese province, yet he set up the Taiwan Provincial Administrative Executive Office, which had extensive political and military power. This design was criticized by Taiwanese and was called the New Governor-General Office.

== Takeover ==
=== Initial reactions ===
On 15 October 1945, the National Revolutionary Army of China arrived in Taiwan, landing at Keelung, where they were greeted by the local Taiwanese population. Businesspeople took out advertisements in local newspapers to celebrate the takeover, and streets were filled with celebrations marked by firecrackers and Chinese lanterns. Although there were limited incidents of Taiwanese retribution against the Japanese, the general situation remained calm and orderly, with the Taiwanese anticipating the Chinese administration's arrival.

=== Surrender ceremony ===
On 25 October 1945, the Japanese surrender ceremony in Taiwan took place at 10 a.m. Western Standard Time at the Taipei Public Hall. The surrendering party was the Japanese Empire's 10th Area Army, represented by Governor-General of Taiwan and 10th Area Army Commander General Rikichi Andō. Chen Yi represented the Allied Commander-in-Chief Chiang Kai-shek to accept the surrender, which was witnessed by representatives of Nationalist government, Taiwanese people, Japanese forces, and American forces.

- Representatives of the Nationalist Government: Chen Yi, Ge Jing'en, Ko Yuan-fen, Huang Chao-chin, Yu Mi-chien, Sung Fei-ju, Li Wan-chu.
- Representatives of the Taiwanese people: Lin Hsien-tang, Chen Hsin, Mosei Lin, Tu Tsung-ming, Lo Wan-chu, Xie Shuangqiu, Huang Shih-hung, Wang Baiyuan.
- Representatives of Japan: Rikichi Andō, Haruki Isayama, Hifumi Suda, Tasuku Nakazawa.
- Allied representatives: Edwin A. Locke Jr., Cecil J. Gridley, Henry Berk, Ulmont W. Holly, George H. Kerr, among 19 others.

After the surrender ceremony, Chen Yi delivered a radio speech proclaiming that Taiwan and the Penghu Islands had rejoined China, marking Taiwan's retrocession. George H. Kerr, who was invited to proofread the English translation of Chen Yi's Chinese speech, noted that it omitted any mention of the role played by the United States. On the Taiwan Provincial Administrative Executive Office officially began operations, with its headquarters located at the former Taipei City Hall.

=== Property takeover ===
From November, the Taiwan Provincial Administrative Executive Office and the Taiwan Garrison Command jointly established the Taiwan Provincial Receiving Committee, tasked with taking over military and administrative functions, as well as Japanese assets in Taiwan. In January 1946, the Handling Committee was set up under the Receiving Committee, with branches in 17 counties and cities to oversee the management of Japanese assets. By July, additional bodies, namely the Property Auction Committee and the Property Liquidation Committee, were established to handle the valuation, auction, and settlement of debts and claims related to the properties and financial institutions.

== Aftermath ==
Shortly after the takeover, the Taiwanese people witnessed a corrupt and undisciplined Chinese administration that seized Taiwan's resources to support the civil war on the mainland. The government's poor economic management led to hyperinflation, reduced production, widespread unemployment and hunger, and a rise in violent crime. Taiwanese citizens faced discrimination by mainland military and government officials, which fueled growing resentment. These factors ultimately contributed to the eruption of the 28 February incident. Many intellectuals who had supported the end of Japanese rule and were hopeful for Chinese governance, including Lin Hsien-tang, were either killed or forced to flee by the government.

== Interpretations and disputes ==
The Nationalist government was criticised for controlling Taiwan as "conquerors", displaying an attitude of "superiority" and exercising authoritarian power. It implemented a 40-year-long period of White Terror, during which Taiwanese people, especially Benshengren, were repressed, and democracy, human rights, and freedoms were stifled. Therefore, a good number of Taiwanese scholars believed that there was no retrocession of Taiwan, but the island was once again conquered by a foreign government.

=== Governmental positions ===
The official position of both the Republic of China (ROC) and the People's Republic of China (PRC) is that Taiwan and Penghu were returned to the Republic of China according to the terms of the 1945 Japanese Instrument of Surrender, which stipulated Japan's compliance with the terms of the Potsdam Declaration. The Potsdam Declaration in turn included the terms of the Cairo Declaration, which required Japan to return all conquered territories to China, including Taiwan and the Pescadores.

The ROC clarified its understanding of the Cairo Declaration in 2014 as a legally binding instrument. Among other things, the clarification listed later treaties and documents that "reaffirmed" aspects of the Cairo Declaration as legally binding, including the Potsdam Proclamation, the Japanese Instrument of Surrender, the Treaty of San Francisco, and the Treaty of Taipei:

The post-war status and jurisdiction over Taiwan and its appertaining islands, including Penghu, was resolved through a series of legal instruments—the Cairo Declaration, the Potsdam Proclamation, the Japanese Instrument of Surrender, the San Francisco Peace Treaty, and the Treaty of Peace between the Republic of China and Japan of 1952. The implementation of the legal obligation to return Taiwan and its appertaining islands (including the Diaoyutai Islands) to the ROC was first stipulated in the Cairo Declaration, and later reaffirmed in the Potsdam Proclamation, the Japanese Instrument of Surrender, the San Francisco Peace Treaty, and the Treaty of Peace between the Republic of China and Japan. The Cairo Declaration is therefore a legally binding instrument with treaty status.

In November 1950, the United States Department of State announced that no formal act restoring sovereignty over Formosa and the Pescadores to China had yet occurred; British officials reiterated this viewpoint in 1955, saying that "The Chinese Nationalists began a military occupation of Formosa and the Pescadores in 1945. However, these areas were under Japanese sovereignty until 1952" and that

[Cairo Declaration] was couched in the form of a statement of intention, and as it was merely a statement of intention, it is merely binding in so far as it states the intent at that time, and therefore it cannot by itself transfer sovereignty.

In March 1961, in a meeting of the House of Councillors of Japan, a councillor of the Japanese Communist Party brought up the notion that Taiwan had been returned to China according to the Cairo Declaration, Potsdam Proclamation, and Japanese Instrument of Surrender. The then-Japanese Minister for Foreign Affairs responded that:

It was specified in Potsdam Proclamation that the articles in Cairo Declaration shall be carried out, and in accordance with Japanese Instrument of Surrender we announced that we would comply with Potsdam Proclamation. However, the so-called Japanese Instrument of Surrender possesses the nature of armistice and does not possess the nature of territorial disposition.

In April 1971, the U.S. Department of State spokesman stated in a press release that the US government regarded the status of Taiwan as unsettled, and that Cairo Declaration was a statement of purpose of the Allies and was never formally implemented or executed.

As late as December 2014, the US government still considered Taiwan's status an unsettled issue.

=== Other positions ===
- Supporters of the Taiwan independence movement have argued that Taiwanese retrocession was invalid since there is no precedent in international law in which an instrument of surrender effected a transfer of sovereignty, and they base their belief in part on both a declassified CIA report from March 1949 confirming that Taiwan was not a part of the Republic of China and President Truman's 27 June 1950 statement regarding Taiwan's "undetermined status", which they hold as proof of the leading Allies' views. In a lengthy legal essay published in Tokyo in 1972, Chairman Ng Chiau-tong, World United Formosans for Independence, analyzed the British Parliamentary records and other documents before concluding that the political status of Taiwan was undetermined.
- Taiwanese historian Jim Lee claims the following: After World War II ended, officials of the Republic of China traveled to Taiwan to accept the surrender of Japanese forces on behalf of the Allies. Although they claimed that it was "Taiwan Retrocession", it was actually a provisional military occupation and was not a transfer of territories of Taiwan and Penghu. A transfer of territory requires a conclusion of an international treaty in order to be valid. But before the government of the Republic of China was able to conclude a treaty with Japan, it was overthrown by the Chinese Communist Party and fled its territory. Consequently, that contributed to the controversy of the "Undetermined Status of Taiwan" and the controversy over "Taiwan Retrocession".
- The Democratic Progressive Party, which rejects the idea of Taiwan being taken back by China, downplayed the event during its two presidencies.
- Because the Republic of China officials who accepted the surrenders of Japanese Forces in 1945 were all representatives of the Allies of World War II, there are opinions that Japanese forces on Taiwan actually surrendered to the Allies, not to the Republic of China, and therefore the so-called "Taiwan Retrocession Day" is merely "Surrenders of Japanese Forces to the Allies Day", which marked the beginning of military occupation and was not a retrocession. The opinions further believe that "Taiwan Retrocession" is a misleading term.
- Writing in the American Journal of International Law in July 2000, Jonathan I. Charney and J. R. V. Prescott maintained that the Chinese Nationalists (ROC) began a military occupation of Taiwan in 1945 as a result of Japan's surrender, and that none of the post–World War II peace treaties explicitly ceded sovereignty over Formosa and the Pescadores to any specific state or government.

== See also ==
- Retrocession Day
- White Terror
- Theory of the Undetermined Status of Taiwan
