= Cession =

Voluntary territorial transfer by treaty

The act of cession is the assignment of property to another entity. In international law it commonly refers to land transferred by treaty. Ballentine's Law Dictionary defines cession as "a surrender; a giving up; a relinquishment of jurisdiction by a board in favor of another agency." In contrast with annexation, where property is forcibly seized, cession is voluntary or at least apparently so.

== Examples ==
In 1790, the U.S. states of Maryland and Virginia both ceded land to create the District of Columbia, as specified in the U.S. Constitution of the previous year. The Virginia portion was given back in 1847, a process known as "retrocession".

Following the First Opium War (1839–1842) and Second Opium War (1856–1860), Hong Kong (Treaty of Nanking) and Kowloon (Convention of Peking) were ceded by the Qing dynasty government of China to the United Kingdom; and following defeat in the First Sino-Japanese War, Taiwan was ceded to the Empire of Japan in 1895.

Territory can also be ceded for payment, such as in the Louisiana Purchase and Alaska Purchase.

== Specific areas of law ==
=== Contract law ===
This is a yielding up, or release. France ceded Louisiana to the United States by the treaty of Paris, of April 30, 1803, following the Louisiana Purchase. Spain made a cession of East and West Florida by the treaty of February 22, 1819. Cessions have been severally made of a part of their territory by New York, Virginia, Massachusetts, Connecticut, South Carolina, North Carolina, and Georgia.

=== Civil law ===
Under the civil law system, cession is the equivalent of assignment, and therefore, is an act by which a personal claim is transferred from the assignor (the cedent) to the assignee (the cessionary). Whereas real rights are transferred by delivery, personal rights are transferred by cession. Once the obligation of the debtor is transferred, the cessionary is entirely substituted. The original creditor (cedent) loses his right to claim and the new creditor (cessionary) gains that right.

=== Ecclesiastical law ===
When an ecclesiastic is created bishop, or when a parson or rector takes another benefice without dispensation, the first benefice becomes void by a legal cession, or surrender.

== Retrocession ==
Retrocession is the return of something (e.g., land or territory) that was ceded in general or, specifically:

Examples:

- District of Columbia retrocession, the retrocession to Virginia, and potentially to Maryland, of the land ceded to create the District of Columbia
- Retrocession of Louisiana (New Spain) from Spain to France, formally accomplished just three weeks before the U.S. received the Louisiana Purchase lands from France

=== Disputed case ===
- The claimed "Taiwan retrocession" refers to the view that the sovereignty over Taiwan has been handed over in 1945 from Japan to the Republic of China, the widely-recognized government of China at the time, following Japan's defeat in WWII. Whether this "retrocession" is legitimate under international law is a disputed issue in the complex political status of Taiwan. See also: Taiwan Retrocession Day.

In insurance, retrocessionary arrangements generally are governed by a reinsurance or retrocessional agreement and the principles applicable to reinsurance also are applicable to retrocessional cover.

== See also ==
- Boundary dispute – Boundary dispute
- Ecclesiastical ordinances – Type of law in some churches
- Escheat – State taking ownership of 'unowned' land
- Jurisdiction – Authority granted to a legal body or political leader to deal with legal matters
- Land back – Movement by Indigenous peoples to reclaim ancestral lands
- List of territory purchased by a sovereign nation from another sovereign nation
- State cessions – U.S. areas ceded by states to the federal government
