= Taiwan independence movement =

Independence movement in East Asia

- Traditional Chinese: 臺灣獨立運動 or 台灣獨立運動
- Simplified Chinese: 台湾独立运动
Transcriptions
Standard Mandarin
- Hanyu Pinyin: Táiwān dúlì yùndòng
- Bopomofo: ㄊㄞˊ ㄨㄢ ㄉㄨˊ ㄌㄧˋ ㄩㄣˋ ㄉㄨㄥˋ
- Gwoyeu Romatzyh: Tair'uan durlih yunndonq
- Wade–Giles: T'ai^{2}-wan^{1} tu^{2}-li^{4} yün^{4}-tung^{4}
- Tongyong Pinyin: Tái-wan dú-lì yùn-dòng
- MPS2: Táiwān dúlì yùndùng
- IPA: [tʰǎɪ.wán tǔ.lî yn.tʊ̂ŋ]
Hakka
- Romanization: Thòi-vân thu̍k-li̍p yun-thung
Southern Min
- Hokkien POJ: Tâi-oân to̍k-li̍p ūn-tōng
- Tâi-lô: Tâi-uân to̍k-li̍p ūn-tōng

Abbreviation
- Traditional Chinese: 臺獨 or 台獨
- Simplified Chinese: 台独
Transcriptions
Standard Mandarin
- Hanyu Pinyin: Táidú
- Bopomofo: ㄊㄞˊ ㄉㄨˊ
- Gwoyeu Romatzyh: Tairdur
- Wade–Giles: T'ai^{2}-tu^{2}
- Tongyong Pinyin: Tái-dú
- MPS2: Táidú
- IPA: [tʰǎɪ.tǔ]
Hakka
- Romanization: Thòi-thu̍k
Southern Min
- Hokkien POJ: Tâi-to̍k
- Tâi-lô: Tâi-To̍k

A proposed flag for an independent Taiwan designed by Donald Liu in 1996

Flag of the World Taiwanese Congress

Flag of the 908 Taiwan Republic Campaign

Claimed territory of the ROC (in light green) since 2002

The Taiwan independence movement is a political movement advocating the Taiwan Area to become a de jure sovereign state, either as the Republic of China (ROC) or a hypothetical Republic of Taiwan. While definitions of Taiwan independence vary, their propositions generally agree on the premise that the People's Republic of China (PRC) does not hold sovereignty over the island of Taiwan. This position contrasts with support for Chinese unification under the One China stance advocated by the Chinese Communist Party (CCP) and the Kuomintang (KMT), as well as with maintaining the status quo in cross-strait relations.

Taiwan's political status is ambiguous due to two historical issues—the competing claims of the PRC and ROC to the entirety of each other's territory due to the technically ongoing Chinese Civil War, and the circumstances surrounding the Treaty of San Francisco, which relinquished Japanese control over Taiwan without officially granting sovereignty to any party. The meaning of "independence" is likewise contentious. Supporters may be referring either to Taidu, the notion of formally creating an independent state called the "Republic of Taiwan" by abolishing the ROC, or to Huadu, the notion that the ROC is already an independent state synonymous with the Taiwan Area. Debates on independence are intertwined with the history of colonization of Taiwan, particularly efforts by the KMT controlled ROC to sinicize Taiwan during the martial law era in the aftermath of World War II.

Regardless of Taiwan's current political status, the ROC exercises autonomous rule in the internal governance of the Taiwan Area and conducts official diplomatic relations with, and is recognized by, 11 member states of the United Nations and the Holy See (Vatican City). Since 2016 the government, led by the independence-leaning Democratic Progressive Party (DPP), has asserted that formal independence is unnecessary as Taiwan is already an independent country called the Republic of China.

In present-day ROC politics, the KMT and the broader Pan-Blue Coalition seek to retain the ambiguous status quo of the ROC under the 1992 Consensus (One China, but different interpretations of China) or gradually reunify with mainland China under the ROC. They are opposed by the DPP and the Pan-Green Coalition, which support independence and argue that unification is a threat to Taiwan's sovereignty, regional identity, parliamentary democratic system and human rights. The Pan-Green Coalition also believes distancing from the concept of "China" and "Chinese identity" is needed for Taiwan to avoid conflation with the PRC and the Chinese Communist Party. Within the Pan-Green Coalition, Taidu activists advocate for de-Sinicization and Taiwanization of the island and society, while the establishment favors maintaining the status quo under the Huadu position.

Because the current ROC constitution includes mainland China as part of ROC territory, the process to separate Taiwan from mainland China per the ROC constitution must be initiated by one-fourth of the members of the Legislative Yuan, passed by the Legislative Yuan by a three-fourths majority with at least three-fourths of members attending, and then approved by half of all eligible voters in a referendum.

The Chinese Communist Party and the People's Republic of China strongly oppose Taiwanese independence, believing that both Taiwan and mainland China are part of their territory, and regard any moves toward independence as separatism which could trigger a military response under the Anti-Secession Law and the Ethnic Unity Law. The PRC also reject any notion of "Two Chinas", which under the PRC's political and legal framework, the ROC had ceased to exist as a legitimate sovereign state in 1949 when the PRC was established. Within PRC domestic law, the territory controlled by the ROC is designated as Taiwan Province, PRC. According to the PRC's interpretation, the Cairo Declaration, the Potsdam Declaration and United Nations General Assembly Resolution 2758 establish that Taiwan is part of the PRC under international law. The PRC has officially maintained its position of peaceful unification with Taiwan under the one country, two systems formula but does not rule out using military force, if necessary, to reunify the island should formal independence be declared. Under 2024 legal guidelines, the PRC regards advocating for Taiwan independence, regardless of jurisdiction, as a criminal offense—serious cases may result in capital punishment.

== History ==
=== Background ===
Taiwan is an island in East Asia. The indigenous population, who came from nearby China, spoke Austronesian languages. These aboriginal people have lived on the island for over 6000 years and, before 1620, were its only inhabitants. Taiwan has been occupied by several nations, including Spain, the Netherlands, China, (Note: Taiwan was ruled by the Ming (Kingdom of Tungning) the Qing and the Republic of China; Taiwanese nationalists who support a de-Sinicization perspective sometimes view Taiwan under Qing rule as having been under Manchu rule rather than Chinese rule, and they see Kingdom of Tungning as separate from Ming in mainland China. Today, the People's Republic of China—commonly referred to as "China"—claims Taiwan as its territory, but has never actually governed the island.) and Japan.

After its defeat in the Chinese Civil War in 1949, the Kuomintang, which had ruled the Republic of China since 1928, retreated to Taiwan where it ruled until Chen Shui-bian of the Democratic Progressive Party (DPP) became president in 2000.

=== Early ===
From a pro-independence supporter's point of view, the movement for Taiwan independence began under Qing rule in the 1680s which led to the well known saying, "Every three years an uprising, every five years a rebellion". Taiwan Independence supporters compared Taiwan under KMT rule to South Africa under apartheid.

Taiwanese society and culture was heavily shaped by the Japanese occupation of the island, which promoted Japanization policies that co-opted local elites with the Imperial Japanese Army. This sparked off localist resistance against the Japanese by both indigenous peoples and native-born Han Chinese-Taiwanese, which was eventually suppressed. Initially carried out by local militias and Qing loyalists between 1895 to 1915, as direct armed rebellions were systematically eliminated by the 1920s, Taiwanese intellectuals pivoted to nonviolent anti-colonial resistance to fight for political autonomy and civil rights. Japan's 50-year colonial rule catalyzed the modern Taiwan independence movement by forging a distinct Taiwanese identity formed through shared experiences under Japanese institutions, education and infrastructure development. Local elections were permitted in 1935, which was the first introduction of voting.

The Taiwan independence movement under Japan was supported by Mao Zedong in the 1930s as a means of freeing Taiwan from Japanese rule.

With the end of World War II in 1945, by issuing "General Order No. 1" to the Supreme Commander for the Allied Powers, the Allies agreed that the Republic of China Army under the KMT would "temporarily occupy Taiwan, on behalf of the Allied forces."

In 1943 Chiang's Nationalists argued that after the end of the war, Taiwan should be restored to the ROC. The CCP followed suit and considered Taiwan an integral part of China. (Note: [W]e cannot discount the impact on the Communists of an international agreement which they accepted as members of the Second United Front and which elevated the Taiwan question to an international level and neatly avoided the issue of Taiwanese representation[sic]. Outright rejection of the Cairo declaration after 1943 (and before the CCP's unexpectedly swift victory in 1949) would have destroyed CCP efforts at gaining international recognition. (After 1949, it would have added an air of legitimacy to KMT occupation of the island and encouraged an indefinite extension of the civil war.) Without strong Taiwanese participation in the Chinese Communist movement, there was simply no compelling reason for the CCP to reject a major international agreement. In effect, Cairo structured the political alternatives on the Taiwan issue in such a manner that continued Communist support for "national liberation" of the island was impossible.) Representatives of the United States and the United Kingdom agreed with Chiang at the Cairo Conference in November, resulting in the Cairo Declaration. The Cairo Declaration stated, "All the territories Japan has stolen from China, such as Manchuria, Formosa [Taiwan], and the Pescadores, shall be returned to the Republic of China." That pledge was confirmed at the Potsdam Conference in 1945.

=== Martial law period ===
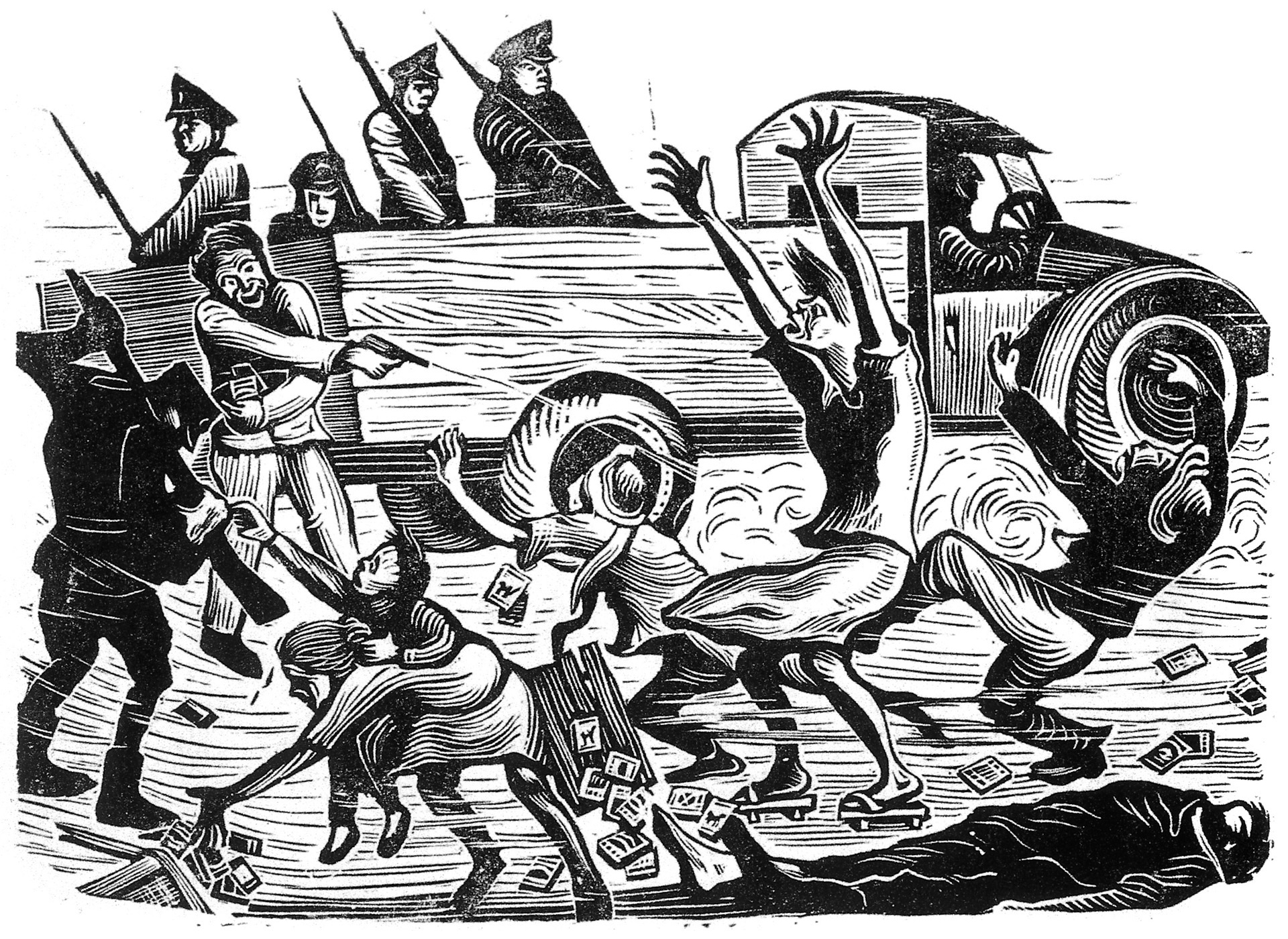
Woodcut print by Huang Rong-can, "The Terrible Inspection" describing the February 28 Incident massacre in 1947

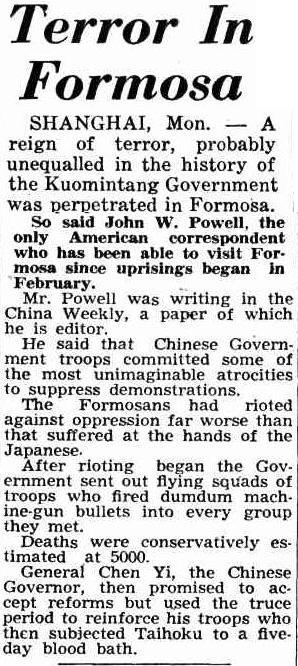
"Terror In Formosa", a news article from The Daily News of Perth, reported the status in March 1947.

The modern-day political movement for Taiwan independence dates back to the Japanese colonial period, but it only became a viable political force within Taiwan in the 1990s. Taiwanese independence was advocated periodically during the Japanese colonial period, but was suppressed by the Japanese government. These efforts were the goal of the Taiwanese Communist Party of the late 1920s. Unlike current formulations, and in line with the thinking of the Comintern, such a state would have been a proletarian one. With the end of World War II in 1945, Japanese rule ended, but the subsequent autocratic rule of the KMT later revived calls for local rule. However, it was a movement supported by the Chinese students who were born on the Island and not associated with KMT. It found its roots in the US and Japan. In the 1950s, a Republic of Taiwan Provisional Government was set up in Japan. Thomas Liao was nominally the President. At one time it held quasi-official relations with the newly independent Indonesia. This was possible mainly through the connections between Sukarno and the Provisional Government's Southeast Asian liaison, Chen Chih-hsiung, who had assisted in Indonesia's local resistance movements against Japanese rule.

After the transfer of power from Japan to the ROC, the focus of the movement was as a vehicle for discontent from the native Taiwanese against the rule of "mainlanders" (i.e. mainland Chinese-born people who fled to Taiwan with KMT in the late 1940s). The February 28 Incident in 1947 and the ensuing martial law that lasted until 1987 contributed to the period of White Terror on the island, persecuting not only indigenous leftists, but liberals and democracy advocates as well.

Between 1949 and 1991, the official position of the ROC government on Taiwan was that it was the legitimate government of all of China and it used this position as justification for authoritarian measures such as the refusal to vacate the seats held by delegates elected on the mainland in 1947 for the Legislative Yuan. The Taiwan independence movement intensified in response to this and presented an alternative vision of a sovereign and independent Taiwanese state. This vision was represented through a number of symbols such as the use of Taiwanese in opposition to the school-taught Mandarin Chinese.

Several scholars drafted various versions of a constitution, as both political statement or vision and as intellectual exercise. Most of these drafts favor a bicameral parliament rather than presidential system. In at least one such draft, seats in the upper house would be divided equally among Taiwan's established ethnicities. In the 1980s the Chinese Nationalist government considered publication of these ideas criminal. In the most dramatic case, it decided to arrest the pro-independence publisher Cheng Nan-jung for publishing a version in his Tang-wai magazine, Liberty Era Weekly (自由時代週刊). Rather than giving himself up, Cheng self-immolated in protest. Other campaigns and tactics toward such a State have included soliciting designs from the public for a new national flag and anthem (for example, Taiwan the Formosa). More recently the Taiwan Name Rectification Campaign (台灣正名運動) has played an active role. More traditional independence supporters, however, have criticized name rectification as merely a superficial tactic devoid of the larger vision inherent in the independence agenda.

Various overseas Taiwan independence movements, such as the Formosan Association, World United Formosans for Independence, United Young Formosans for Independence, Union for Formosa's Independence in Europe, United Formosans in America for Independence, and Committee for Human Rights in Formosa, published "The Independent Formosa" in several volumes with the publisher "Formosan Association." In "The Independent Formosa, Volumes 2–3", they tried to justify Taiwanese collaboration with Japan during World War II by saying that the "atmosphere covered the whole Japanese territories, including Korea and Formosa, and the Japanese mainlands as well", when Taiwanese publications supported Japan's "holy war", and that the people who did it were not at fault.

The anti-communist KMT leader Chiang Kai-shek, President of the ROC on Taiwan, believed that the Americans were going to plot a coup against him in collusion with Taiwan independence activists. In 1950, Chiang Ching-kuo became director of the secret police, which he remained until 1965. Chiang also considered some people who were friends to Americans to be his enemies. An enemy of the Chiang family, Wu Kuo-chen, was kicked out of his position of governor of Taiwan by Chiang Ching-kuo and fled to America in 1953. Chiang Ching-kuo, educated in the Soviet Union, initiated Soviet style military organization in the ROC Military. He reorganized and Sovietized the political officer corps, surveillance, and KMT party activities. Opposed to this was Sun Li-jen, who was educated at the American Virginia Military Institute. Chiang orchestrated the controversial court-martial and arrest of General Sun Li-jen in August 1955, for plotting a coup d'état with the American CIA against his father Chiang Kai-shek and the KMT. The CIA allegedly wanted to help Sun take control of Taiwan and declare its independence.

During the martial law era lasting until 1987, discussion of Taiwan independence was forbidden in Taiwan, at a time when recovery of the mainland and national unification were the stated goals of the ROC. During that time, many advocates of independence and other dissidents fled overseas, and carried out their advocacy work there, notably in Japan and the United States. Part of their work involved setting up think tanks, political organizations, and lobbying networks in order to influence the politics of their host countries, notably the United States, the ROC's main ally at the time, though they would not be very successful until much later. Within Taiwan, the independence movement was one of many dissident causes among the intensifying democracy movement of the 1970s, which culminated in the 1979 Kaohsiung Incident. The DPP was eventually formed to represent dissident causes.

=== Multiparty period ===
After the lifting of martial law in 1987 and the acceptance of multi-party politics, the DPP became increasingly identified with Taiwan independence, which was added to its party platform in 1991. At the same time, many overseas independence advocates and organizations returned to Taiwan. For the first time, they openly promoted their cause and gradually built up political support. Many had previously fled to the US or Europe and had been on a blacklist held by the KMT, which had prevented them from returning to Taiwan. In their places of exile, they established organisations like the European Federation of Taiwanese Associations and the Formosan Association for Public Affairs.

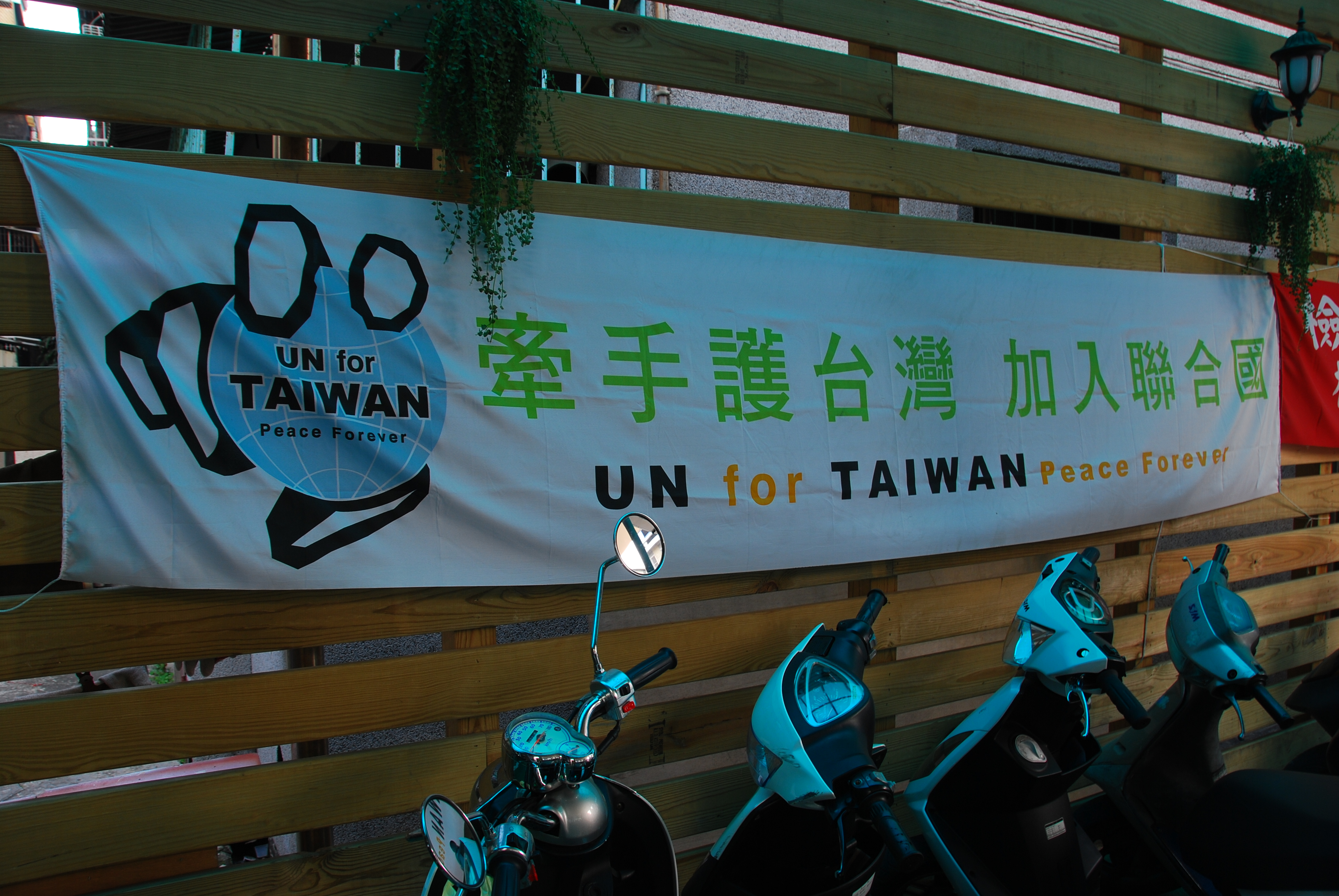
Banner displaying the slogan "UN for Taiwan"

As the electoral success of the DPP, and later, the DPP-led Pan-Green Coalition grew in recent years, the Taiwan independence movement shifted its focus to identity politics by proposing many plans involving symbolism and social engineering. The reinterpretation of historical events such as the February 28 Incident, the use of broadcast language and mother tongue education in schools, the official name and flag of the ROC, slogans in the army, and the orientation of maps all have been issues of concern to the present-day Taiwan independence movement activists.

The movement, which peaked in the 70s through the 90s with the Taiwan literature movement and other cultural upheavals, has moderated in recent years with the assimilation of these changes. Friction between "mainlander" and "native" communities on Taiwan has decreased due to shared interests, such as increasing economic ties with mainland China, continuing threats by the PRC to invade, and doubts as to whether or not the United States would support a unilateral declaration of independence. Since the late 1990s many supporters of Taiwan independence have argued that Taiwan, as the ROC, is already independent from the mainland, making a formal declaration unnecessary. In May 1999, the DPP formalized this position in its "Resolution on Taiwan's Future".

==== Lee Teng-hui administration (1988–2000) ====
In 1995, Taiwanese president Lee Teng-hui was given permission to speak at Cornell University about his dream of Taiwanese independence, the first time a Taiwanese leader had been allowed to visit the United States. This led to a military response from China that included buying Russian submarines and conducting missile tests near Taiwan.

==== Chen Shui-bian administration (2000–2008) ====
Republic of China passport mentioning Taiwan since 2003 in order to distinguish it from the People's Republic of China passport. In 2020, the Ministry of Foreign Affairs launched a redesigned passport that highlights "Taiwan"

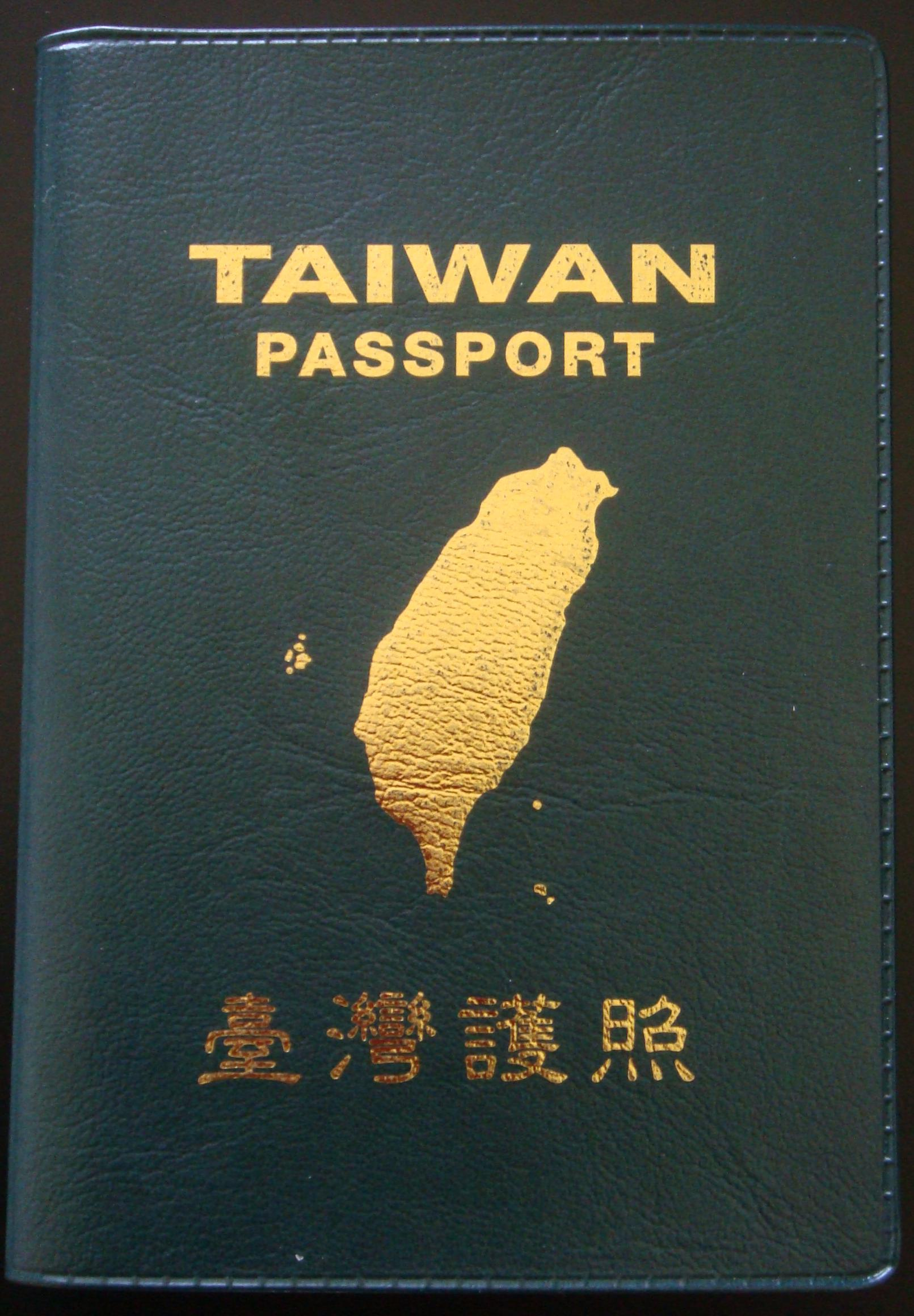
An example of a "Taiwan passport", which is typically not accepted in place of the R.O.C. passport

Chen Shui-bian was the first DPP-elected president, and born to a local Hoklo family, began to push for localization policies vehemently. Initially pledging the moderate Four Noes and One Without policy at the start of his presidency, by the end of his presidency, he proposed the radical concept of "One Country on Each Side", which articulated that the PRC and ROC are two different countries, drawing condemnation from the KMT and internationally from the PRC and mild criticism from the United States.

In February 2007, President Chen Shui-bian initiated changes to names of state-owned enterprises, and the nation's embassies and overseas representative offices. As a result, Chunghwa Post Co. (中華郵政) was renamed Taiwan Post Co. (臺灣郵政) and Chinese Petroleum Corporation (中國石油) is now called CPC Corporation, Taiwan (臺灣中油) and the signs in Taiwan's embassies now display the word "Taiwan" in brackets after "Republic of China". In 2007, the Taiwan Post Co. issued stamps bearing the name "Taiwan" in remembrance of the February 28 Incident. However, the name of the post office was reverted to "Chunghwa Post Co." following the inauguration of KMT president Ma Ying-jeou in 2008.

The Pan-Blue camp voiced its opposition to the changes and the former KMT Chairman Ma Ying-jeou said that it would generate diplomatic troubles and cause cross-strait tensions. It also argued that without a change in the relevant legislation pertaining to state-owned enterprises, the name changes of these enterprises could not be valid. As the Pan-Blue camp held only a slim parliamentary majority throughout the administration of President Chen, the Government's motion to change the law to this effect was blocked by the opposition. Later, U.S. Department of State spokesman Sean McCormack said that the U.S. does not support administrative steps that would appear to change the status-quo by either Taipei or Beijing as threats to regional security.

Former president Lee Teng-hui has stated that he never pursued Taiwanese independence. Lee views Taiwan as already an independent state, and that the call for "Taiwanese independence" could even confuse the international community by implying that Taiwan once viewed itself as part of China. From this perspective, Taiwan is independent even if it remains unable to enter the UN. Lee said the most important goals are to improve the people's livelihoods, build national consciousness, make a formal name change and draft a new constitution that reflects the present reality so that Taiwan can officially identify itself as a country.

==== Ma Ying-jeou administration (2008–2016) ====
Legislative elections were held on 12 January 2008, resulting in a supermajority (86 of the 113 seats) in the legislature for the KMT and the Pan-Blue Coalition. President Chen Shui-bian's DPP was handed a heavy defeat, winning only the remaining 27 seats. The junior partner in the Pan-Green Coalition, the Taiwan Solidarity Union, won no seats.

Two months later, the election for the 12th-term President and vice-president of the Republic of China was held on Saturday, 22 March 2008. KMT nominee Ma Ying-jeou won, with 58% of the vote, ending eight years of DPP rule. Along with the 2008 legislative election, Ma's landslide victory brought the KMT back to power in Taiwan.

On 1 August 2008, the Board of Directors of Taiwan Post Co. resolved to reverse the name change and restored the name "Chunghwa Post". The Board of Directors, as well as resolving to restore the name of the corporation, also resolved to re-hire the chief executive dismissed in 2007, and to withdraw defamation proceedings against him.

On 2 September 2008, President Ma defined the relations between Taiwan and mainland China as "special", but "not that between two states" – they are relations based on two areas of one state, with Taiwan considering that state to be the ROC, and mainland China considering that state to be the PRC.

Ma's approach with the mainland is conspicuously evasive of political negotiations that may lead to unification which is the mainland's ultimate goal, but instead promoted economic integration and free trade through the Economic Cooperation Framework Agreement (ECFA). The National Unification Guidelines remain "frozen" and Ma precluded any discussion of unification during his term by his "three no's" (no unification, no independence, and no use of force).

==== Tsai Ing-wen and Lai Ching-te administration (2016–present) ====
The DPP, led by Tsai Ing-wen, won a landslide victory over the KMT in 2016 and was reelected in 2020. Her administration stated that it sought to maintain the current political status of Taiwan. The PRC government continued to criticize the ROC government, as the DPP administration has continued to not officially recognize the 1992 Consensus and the One China policy.

Lai Ching-te, the DPP candidate, won the presidential election in 2024. During the campaign period, Lai asserted Taiwanese sovereignty, adding that "the ROC and the PRC are not subordinate to each other" but said a formal declaration of independence would be unnecessary and favored maintaining the status quo. He also said he would be willing to work with the Chinese government, but only if they renounce any intentions to use force against Taiwan.

== Positions ==
The questions of independence and the island's relationship to mainland China are complex and inspire very strong emotions among Taiwanese people. There are some who continue to maintain the Kuomintang's position, which states that the ROC is the sole legitimate government for all of China (of which they consider Taiwan to be a part), and that the aim of the government should be eventual unification of the mainland and Taiwan under the rule of the ROC. Some argue that Taiwan has been, and should continue to be, completely independent from China and should become a Taiwanese state with a distinct name. Then, there are numerous positions running the entire spectrum between these two extremes, as well as differing opinions on how best to manage either situation should it ever be realized.

Taiwan independence is supported by the Pan-Green Coalition in Taiwan, led by the centre-left DPP, but opposed by the Pan-Blue Coalition, led by the conservative KMT. The former coalition aims to eventually achieve full sovereign independence for Taiwan. Whereas, the latter coalition aims to improve relations with the Beijing government (PRC) — which it refers to as "mainland China" — and eventually "reunify" at some point.

Both factions have long been forced to precariously dance around the so-called "status quo" of Taiwan's political status. The DPP is unable to immediately declare independence due to pressure from the PRC and the KMT, whereas the KMT and PRC are unable to immediately achieve Chinese unification due to pressure from the DPP and its de facto allies (including the United States, Japan, and the European Union); further, the vast majority of Taiwanese as well as the KMT oppose the mainland's proposed one country, two systems solution.

=== Support for independence ===
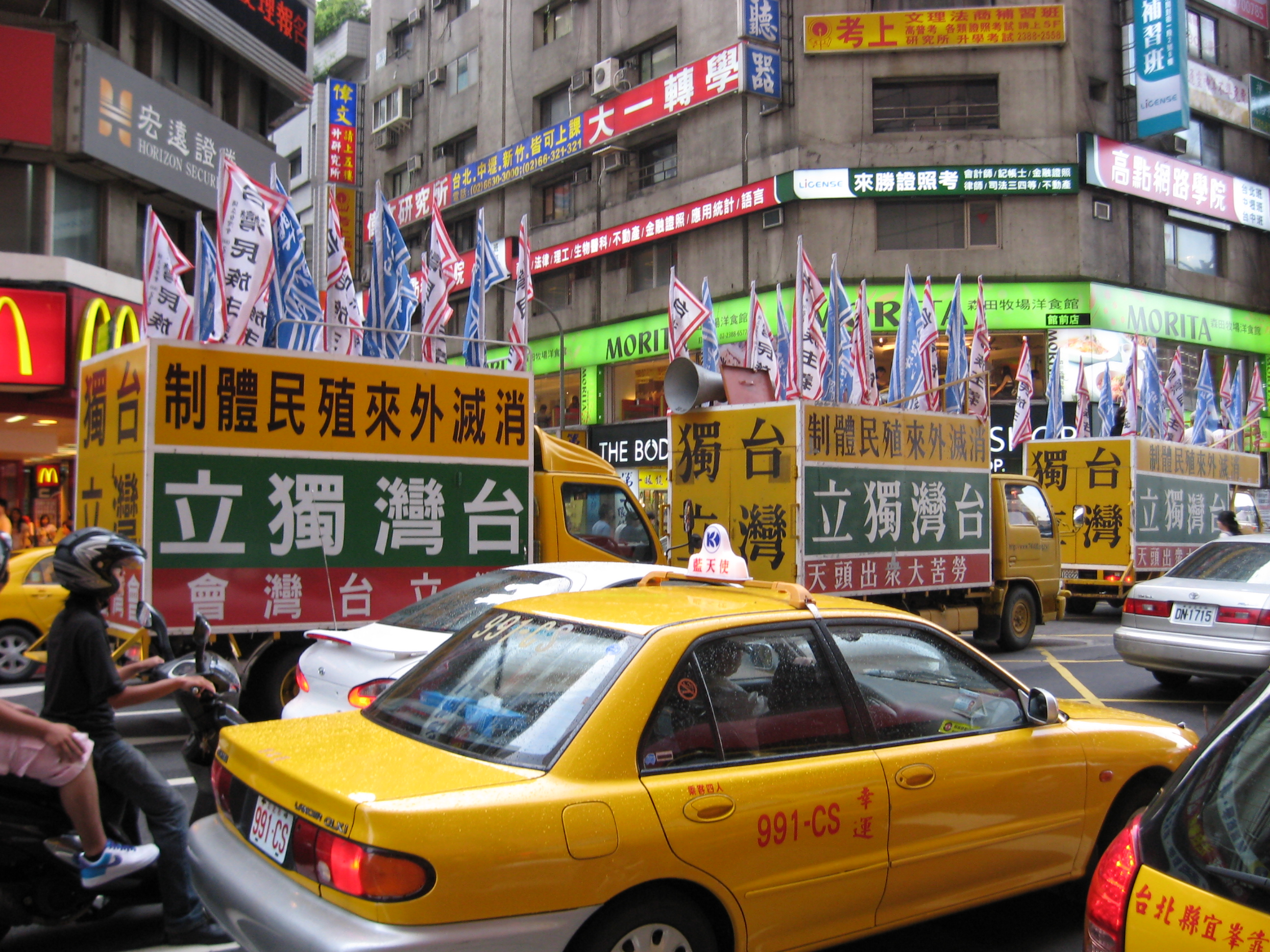
Parade of Taiwan independence supporters

The first view considers the move for Taiwan independence as a nationalist movement. Historically, this was the view of such pro-independence groups as the Tangwai movement (which later grew into the DPP) who argued that the ROC under the KMT had been a "foreign regime" forcibly imposed on Taiwan that is akin to "settler colonialism". Since the 1990s, supporters of Taiwan independence no longer actively make this argument. Instead, the argument has been that, in order to survive the growing power of the PRC, Taiwan must view itself as a separate and distinct entity from "China."

Such a change in view involves:

- removing the name of "China" from official and unofficial items in Taiwan,
- changes in history books, which now portrays Taiwan as a central entity,
- promoting the use of multilingualism in the government and in the education system,
- reducing economic and cultural links with mainland China,
- opposing Chinese unification regardless of China liberalizing or becoming a liberal democracy
- promoting the general thinking that Taiwan is a separate entity.

The goal of this movement is the eventual creation of a country where China is a foreign entity, and Taiwan is an internationally recognized country separate from any concept of "China". Some supporters of Taiwan independence argue that the Treaty of San Francisco justifies Taiwan independence by not explicitly granting Taiwan to either the ROC or the PRC, even though neither the PRC nor the ROC government accepts such legal justification. They advocate instead for a entirely new, Taiwan-centric constitution that detached any notion of "China" and abolished the ROC entirely.

Some left-wing Taiwanese progressive activists also proposed using the presence of Taiwanese indigenous peoples, which makes up just 2.4% of the population as justifications for independence. However, this move draws controversy from the indigenous communities, who are wary of their issues being politicized for such purposes.

The Taiwan Independence Party (TAIP) won a single seat in the Legislative Yuan in the 1998 legislative election. The Taiwan Solidarity Union (TSU) was formed in 2001, and is also supportive of independence. Though it gained more legislative support than TAIP in elections, the TSU's legislative representation has dropped over time. In 2018, political parties and organizations demanding a referendum on Taiwan's independence formed an alliance to further their objective. The Formosa Alliance was established on 7 April 2018, prompted by a sense of crisis in the face of growing pressure from China for unification. The alliance wanted to hold a referendum on Taiwan's independence in April 2019, and change the island's name from the "Republic of China" to "State/Republic of Taiwan," and apply for membership in the United Nations. In August 2019, another party supportive of independence, the Taiwan Action Party Alliance was founded.

==== Huadu and Taidu ====
Within the Pan-Green Coalition of Taiwan, there are two main factions, the Huadu and Taidu. The more moderate Huadu faction, mainly located in the DPP establishment, posits Taiwan and its outlying islands are already a sovereign state under the name "Republic of China", making a formal declaration of independence unnecessary. Huadu politics is the semi-official stance of the ruling DPP under the Lai Ching-te and Tsai Ing-wen administrations.

Conversely, the more radical Taidu faction advocates a more radical departure from the status quo by making a formal declaration of independence to create a de jure "Republic of Taiwan"; advocates for a de jure Taiwanese state can be found in smaller parties in the Pan-Green coalition, such as the Taiwan Statebuilding Party and Taiwan Solidarity Union, as well as in minority elements of the ruling DPP.

The term "Taiwan independence movement" is thus somewhat imprecise inasmuch its main representative, the DPP, does not support any change in the constitutional name of the Taiwanese state for the foreseeable future; they generally view the modern ROC as synonymous with a sovereign Taiwanese state; the incumbent President of Taiwan, Lai Ching-te of the DPP, believes that "Taiwan is already a sovereign, independent country called the Republic of China".

=== Support for status quo ===
A second view is that Taiwan is already an independent nation with the official name "Republic of China," which has been independent (i.e. de facto separate from mainland China/de jure separate from PRC) since the end of the Chinese Civil War in 1949, when the ROC lost control of mainland China, with only Taiwan (including the Penghu islands), Kinmen (Quemoy), the Matsu Islands off the coast of Fujian Province, and some of the islands in the South China Sea remaining under its administration. Although previously no major political faction adopted this pro-status quo viewpoint, because it is a "compromise" in face of PRC threats and American warnings against a unilateral declaration of independence, the DPP combined it with their traditional belief to form their latest official policy.

This viewpoint has not been adopted by more radical groups such as the Taiwan Solidarity Union, which favor only the view described above and are in favor of an independent Republic or State of Taiwan. In addition, many members of the Pan-Blue Coalition are rather suspicious of this view, fearing that adopting this definition of Taiwan independence is merely an insincere stealth tactical effort to advance de-sinicization and the radical view of Taiwan independence. As a result, supporters of Pan-Blue tend to make a clear distinction between Taiwan independence and Taiwan sovereignty, while supporters of Pan-Green tend to try to blur the distinction between the two.

Most Taiwanese and political parties of the ROC support the status quo and recognize de facto independence through sovereign self-rule. Even among those who believe Taiwan is and should remain independent, the threat of war from the PRC softens their approach, and they tend to support maintaining the status quo rather than pursuing an ideological path that could result in war with the PRC. When President Lee Teng-hui put forth the two-states policy, he received 80% support. A similar situation arose when President Chen Shui-bian declared that there was "one country on each side" of the Taiwan Strait. To this day, the parties disagree, sometimes bitterly, on such things as territory, name (ROC or Taiwan), future policies, and interpretations of history. The Pan-Blue Coalition and the PRC believe that Lee Teng-hui and Chen Shui-bian are intent on publicly promoting a moderate form of Taiwan independence in order to advance secretly deeper forms of Taiwan independence, and that they intend to use popular support on Taiwan for political separation to advance notions of cultural and economic separation.

The United States does not officially support Taiwanese independence, following its longstanding adherence to the "One China policy". However, the U.S. has a policy of "strategic ambiguity" and opposes any unilateral changes to the status quo across the Taiwan Strait from either side.

=== Opposition to independence ===
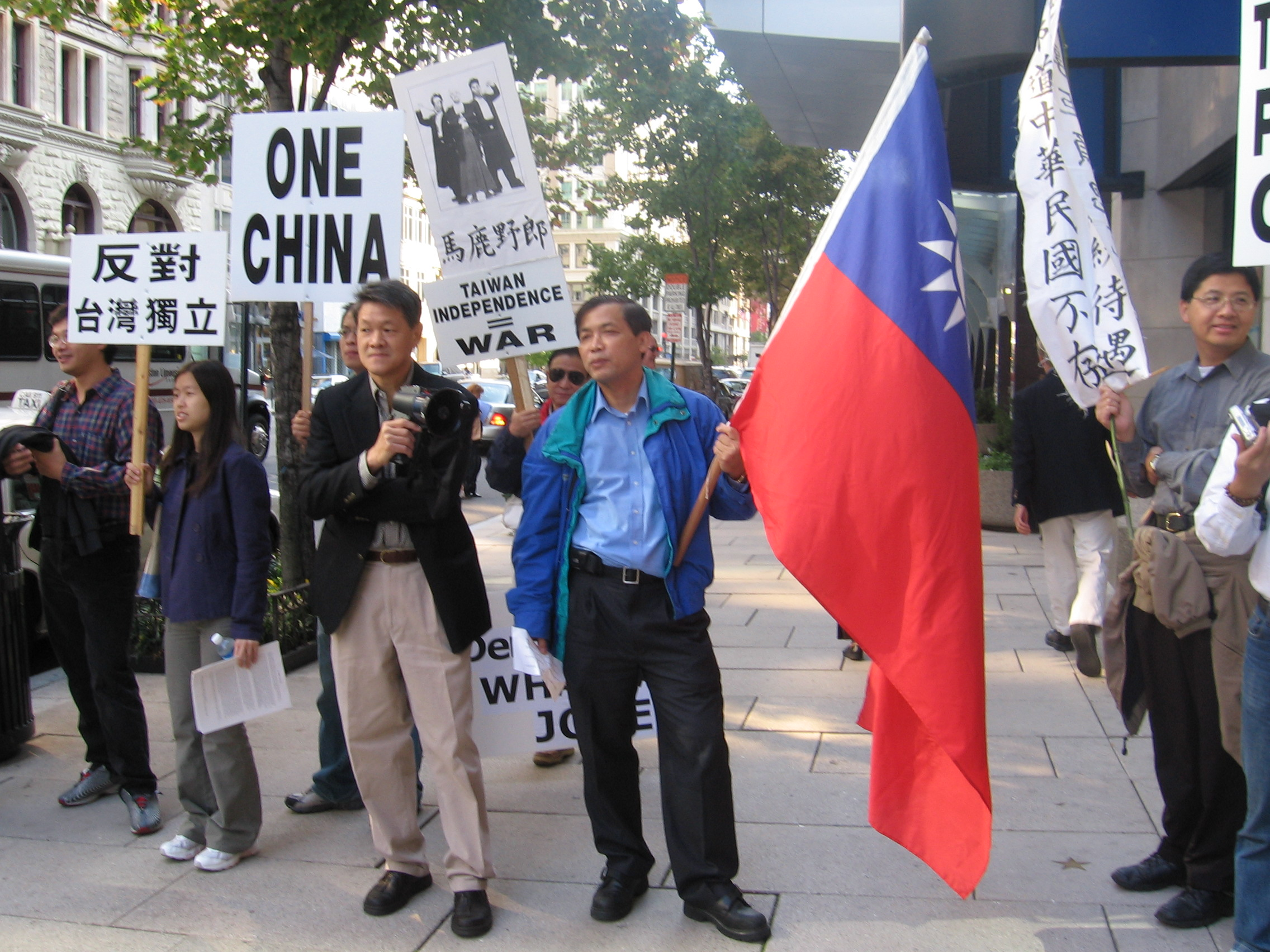
Anti-Taiwan independence protesters in Washington, D.C. during Lee Teng-hui's visit in 2005

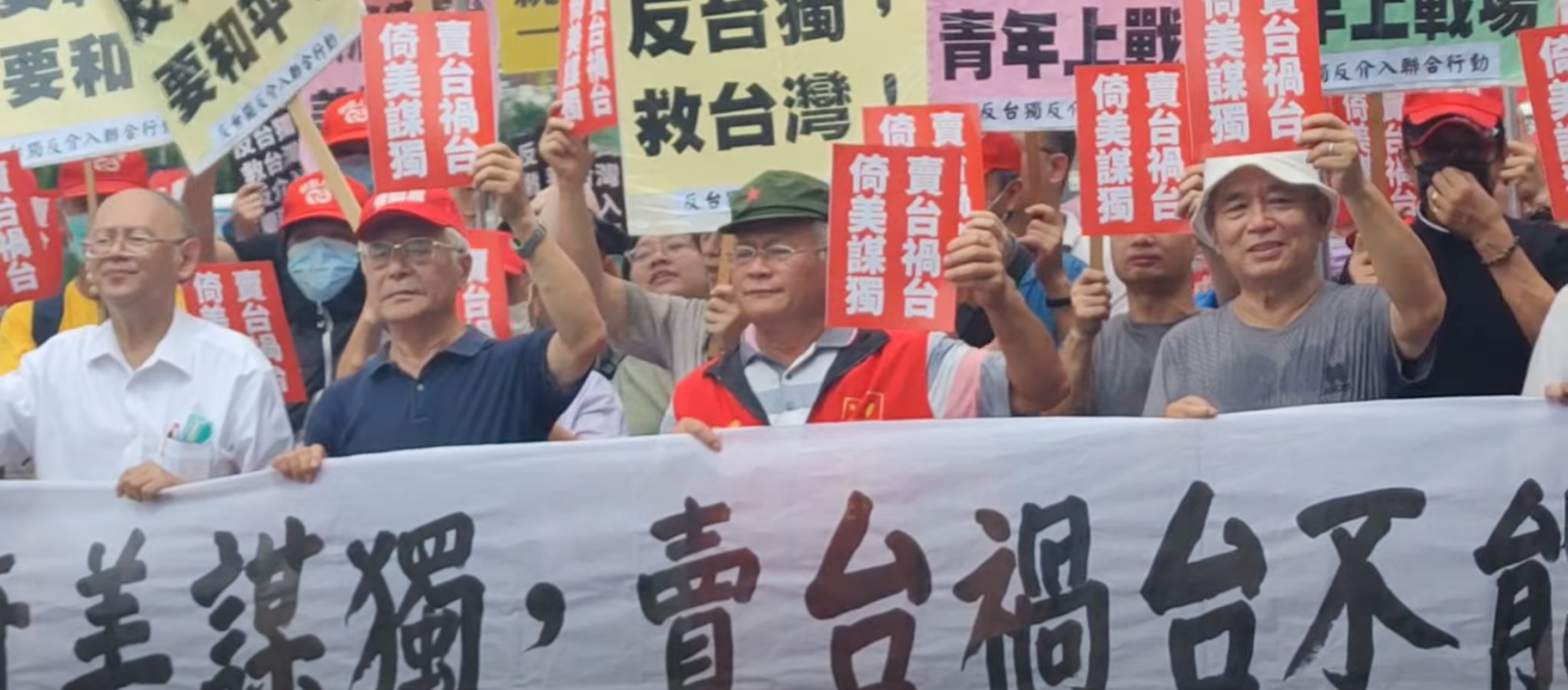
A joint anti-Taiwan independence and anti-intervention protest against Lai Ching‑te in Taiwan, 2023

The third view, put forward by the government of the PRC and the Kuomintang, defines Taiwan independence as "splitting Taiwan from China, causing division of the nation and the people." What the PRC claims by this statement is somewhat ambiguous according to supporters of Taiwanese independence, as some statements by the PRC seem to identify China solely and uncompromisingly with the PRC. Others propose a broader and more flexible definition suggesting that both mainland China and Taiwan are parts that form one cultural and geographic entity, although divided politically as a vestige of the Chinese Civil War. Chinese nationalists have called the Taiwan independence movement and its supporters to be hanjian (traitors).

The Kuomintang and the broader Pan-Blue coalition believe that China should be unified under the ROC and opposes any attempts in de-sinicization that erases any links with China. Since 2016, divisions have emerged in the coalition following electoral defeats and widespread sentiments among the Taiwanese electorate that rejects any form of unification, with pro-Beijing elements beginning to infiltrate the ranks of the coalition through the united front that advocate unification under the PRC.

The PRC considers itself the sole legitimate government of all China, and the ROC to be a defunct entity replaced in the Communist revolution that succeeded in 1949. Therefore, assertions that the ROC is a sovereign state are construed as support for Taiwan independence, as are proposals to rename the ROC. Such a name change is met with even more disapproval since it rejects Taiwan as part of the greater China entity (as one side of a still-unresolved Chinese civil war). The ROC used to be recognized by the UN as the sole legal government of China until 1971. In that year, the UN Resolution 2758 was passed, and the PRC became recognized as the legal government of China by the UN.

The CCP classifies Taiwan independence activists as one of the Five Poisons. In 2005, the 10th National People's Congress passed the Anti-Secession Law authorizing military force for unification. In 2022, opposition to Taiwan independence was added to the CCP constitution. In 2024, the Chinese government issued the Guidelines on Imposing Criminal Punishments on Diehard "Taiwan independence" Separatists for Conducting or Inciting Secession to the courts stating that "diehard" independence supporters could be tried in absentia with capital punishment imposed.

== Legal basis ==
The 1895 Treaty of Shimonoseki and 1951 Treaty of San Francisco are often cited as the main bases for Taiwan independence in international law if such things as "self-determination" and the Montevideo Convention (on the Rights and Duties of States) are to be disregarded. These two treaties are not recognized by the Beijing government and the Pan-Blue Coalition of Taiwan.

=== Undetermined status theory ===
One hypothesis as to a legal basis for an independent Taiwanese state, the theory of the undetermined status of Taiwan, posits that:

a) Japan gained sovereignty over Taiwan in 1895

b) Japan lost sovereignty over Taiwan around 1951–1952 according to the Treaty of San Francisco

c) The Treaty of San Francisco does not assign Taiwan to any power

Therefore, some activists and legal scholars hold that, legally speaking, the island of Taiwan is not an integral part of the territory of the ROC (or any other internationally recognized state); its status is more similar to a League of Nations mandate or United Nations trust territory administered by the ROC pending a final decision.

==== PRC position ====
The PRC government regards post-war arrangements such as the Treaty of San Francisco as irrelevant to the Taiwan issue, arguing that the Treaty of Shimonoseki (being an unequal treaty) has been nullified by Japan's defeat in World War II. The PRC asserts that sovereignty over Taiwan was reverted back to China on the basis of the Cairo Communique, the Potsdam Declaration and the Japanese Instrument of Surrender; inasmuch as the PRC is the internationally recognized "China" and claimed succession to the ROC in 1949, it thus posits that it is the lawful sovereign power on the island, despite having never ruled over the island in any capacity. The PRC further argues that subsequent instruments, such as the 1972 Japan–China Joint Communiqué reaffirms Japan's acceptance of the Potsdam Declaration, despite Japan's ambiguous position with regards to Chinese sovereignty over the island. The United Nations currently recognizes Taiwan as an integral part of China (and thus, implicitly, the PRC), that concurred with the Chinese interpretation of the United Nations General Assembly Resolution 2758.

===== 2024 guidelines =====
In 2024, the PRC issued the Guidelines on Imposing Criminal Punishments on Diehard "Taiwan independence" Separatists for Conducting or Inciting Secession, based partially on the 2005 Anti-Secession Law, stating that supporters of Taiwanese independence, regardless of their location, could be tried in absentia and sentenced to death by Chinese courts.

==== ROC position ====
The ROC government do not proclaim legal indeterminacy and continue to operate under the assumption that the ROC exist as a sovereign authority de jure. ROC law does not ground Taiwan sovereignty on the agreements of World War II that are regarded as statements of intent rather than legally binding or the transfer of title of Taiwan to the ROC as there are no constitutional or statutory provisions that clearly define a formalized legal mechanism. The 1991 constitutional amendments treats the mainland Chinese areas as outside ROC jurisdiction and the citizens of the PRC as non-members of the ROC (Taiwan) political community. The abolishment of the Temporary Provisions against the Communist Rebellion the same year also meant that the Chinese Communist Party (CCP) was no longer legally labeled a "rebellious group" to be eliminated, but an equal political entity ruling the mainland, which in turn legally decriminalized the independence movement within Taiwan, even though ROC constitution remains chained to the "One China" ideology.

=== Kinmen and Matsu issue ===
Kinmen and Matsu are unique and important for several reasons. The islands straddle the southeastern coastline of mainland China, only a few kilometers away from mainland China's Fujian Province. They are geographically defined as being part of mainland China rather than Taiwan. The islands are defined as comprising the truncated, streamlined Fujian Province (officially "Fuchien Province") of the ROC on Taiwan.

Within Taiwan, the radical camp believes that Kinmen County (Quemoy) and Lienchiang County (Matsu) should be abandoned from a potential independent and sovereign Taiwanese state. This view aligns with the aforementioned treaties and acts that do not define Kinmen and Matsu as being part of Taiwan. This same camp also believes that the PRC has only "allowed" the ROC to continue controlling Kinmen and Matsu in order to "tether" Taiwan to mainland China. The fact that the PRC propagandizes Kinmen and Matsu is evidence that this is true to at least a certain degree. In a hypothetical scenario where Kinmen and Matsu are abandoned by the Taiwanese state, they would likely be "ceded" to the PRC via a peace treaty, officially ending the Chinese Civil War. Many domestic and foreign defense analysts also grimly conclude that the islands could likely be easily taken by the PLA given its short distance from the mainland should the Chinese choose to do so, and many inhabitants identify with China and would likely not resist due to their shared identity and ethnicity.

Also within Taiwan, the moderate camp believes that Quemoy and Matsu belong to Taiwan. This camp believes that the ROC and Taiwan have become one and the same. By this logic, Taiwan effectively owns all of the same territories that the ROC is said to own. Among these territories is Quemoy and Matsu. If a potential Taiwanese state were to be created, this camp believes that the new country will actually be the successor state to the ROC, rather than an entirely new country. Therefore, if Taiwan independence were to be successfully achieved, then the islands of Quemoy and Matsu would hypothetically cease to be administered as "Fujian Province", and would instead simply be classified as "satellite islands of Taiwan" (much in the same way as Penghu).

Despite the differing views of these two camps, there is a general understanding throughout Taiwan that Quemoy and Matsu are not part of the historical region of "Taiwan", due to having never been governed under the following regimes: Dutch Formosa, Spanish Formosa, Kingdom of Tungning, Republic of Formosa, and Japanese Formosa. Additionally, Quemoy and Matsu experienced a unique history for several years as military outposts of the ROC, further separating the islands from Taiwan in terms of culture.

== Opinion polls ==
Several polls have indicated an increase in support of Taiwanese independence in the three decades after 1990. In a Taiwanese Public Opinion Foundation (TPOF) poll conducted in June 2020, 54% of respondents supported de jure independence for Taiwan, 23.4% preferred maintaining the status quo, 12.5% favored unification with China, and 10% did not hold any particular view on the matter. This represented the highest level of support for Taiwanese independence since the survey was first conducted in 1991. A later TPOF poll in 2022 showed similar results, as 50% said they support Taiwan independence, 11.8% were for unification, 25.7% were for maintaining status quo. In the Taiwan Independence vs. Unification with the Mainland Survey by The Election Study Center of National Chengchi University there has been a steady increase in respondents choosing "maintain the status quo and move toward independence in the future" since the survey began in 1994. However, the option "maintain the status quo indefinitely" had a similar increase in the same period and the most popular option was "maintain the status quo and decide in the future between independence or unification" every year between 1994 and 2022. The option "independence as soon as possible" never went above 10% in the same time period. "Unification as soon as possible" has been more unpopular – never going above 4.5%.

According to My Formosa, 26.4 percent of Taiwanese respondents agreed that "both sides of the Taiwan Strait belong under one China", up from 17.4 in 2024, while 65.7 percent disagreed, down from 76.4 percent in 2025. Additionally, 37.4 percent of Taiwanese respondents classified cross-strait relations as a business partnership, while 16.9 percent classified as a relationship between enemies. My Formosa also found that the percentage Taiwanese aged 20–29 who agreed that the mainland and Taiwan do not belong to "one China" fell from 82.1 percent to 65.8 percent from 2015 to 2025. Additionally, the percentage of Taiwanese aged 20–29 who favored independence dropped from 26.7 in 2023 to 17.9 in 2025, while the percentage who favored unification increased from 1.4 percent to 6.8. This meant that Taiwanese aged 20–29 were less in favor of Taiwan independence and more in favor of Chinese unification than almost all other age groups.

Date(s) conducted	Polling firm	Sample size	Margin of error	Independence (Note: Includes respondents who answered that they would like the ROC government to maintain the status quo at present but eventually work towards independence.)	Unification (Note: Includes respondents who answered that they would like the ROC government to maintain the status quo at present but eventually work towards unification with China.)	Status quo	No opinion	Lead
17–21 October 2019	MAC	1,073	±2.99 pp	27.7%	10.3%	56.8%	5.2%	29.1%
21–24 November 2019	CWM	1,073	±2.99 pp	32%	5.5%	58.1%	4.4%	26.1%
15–16 June 2020	TPOF	1,074	±2.99 pp	54%	12.5%	23.4%	10%	30.6%
8–9 August 2022	TPOF	1,035	±3.05 pp	50%	11.8%	25.7%	12.5%	24.3%

Polls conducted by ESC, NCCU (1994–2024)
Year conducted	Sample size	Independence as soon as possible	Maintain status quo, move toward independence	Maintain status quo, decide at a later date	Maintain status quo indefinitely	Maintain status quo, move toward unification	Unification as soon as possible	No opinion
1994	1,209	3.1%	8.0%	38.5%	9.8%	15.6%	4.4%	20.5%
1995	21,402	3.5%	8.1%	26.3%	15.6%	19.4%	2.3%	26.3%
1996	10,666	4.1%	9.5%	30.5%	15.3%	19.5%	2.5%	18.6%
1997	3,910	5.7%	11.5%	30.5%	16.3%	17.3%	3.2%	15.4%
1998	14,063	5.7%	11.5%	30.3%	15.9%	15.9%	2.1%	18.7%
1999	9,273	4.7%	13.6%	30.9%	18.8%	15.2%	2.2%	15.2%
2000	11,062	3.1%	11.6%	29.5%	19.2%	17.3%	2.0%	17.4%
2001	10,679	3.7%	10.5%	35.9%	16.4%	17.5%	2.8%	10.5%
2002	10,003	4.3%	13.8%	36.2%	15.0%	15.7%	2.5%	12.4%
2003	14,247	6.2%	14.5%	35.0%	18.0%	11.9%	1.8%	12.5%
2004	34,854	4.4%	15.2%	36.5%	20.9%	10.6%	1.5%	11.0%
2005	7,939	6.1%	14.2%	37.3%	19.9%	12.3%	1.8%	8.5%
2006	13,193	5.6%	13.8%	38.7%	19.9%	12.1%	2.0%	7.9%
2007	13,910	7.8%	13.7%	36.8%	18.4%	10.0%	1.9%	11.4%
2008	16,280	7.1%	16.0%	35.8%	21.5%	8.7%	1.5%	9.4%
2009	20,244	5.8%	15.0%	35.1%	26.2%	8.5%	1.3%	8.1%
2010	13,163	6.2%	16.2%	35.9%	25.4%	9.0%	1.2%	6.1%
2011	23,779	4.6%	15.6%	33.8%	27.4%	8.8%	1.5%	8.2%
2012	18,011	4.8%	15.1%	33.9%	27.7%	8.7%	1.7%	8.1%
2013	13,359	5.7%	17.2%	32.6%	26.3%	9.2%	1.9%	7.2%
2014	20,009	5.9%	18.0%	34.3%	25.2%	7.9%	1.3%	7.3%
2015	22,509	4.3%	17.9%	34.0%	25.4%	8.1%	1.5%	8.8%
2016	15,099	4.6%	18.3%	33.3%	26.1%	8.5%	1.7%	7.4%
2017	13,455	5.1%	17.2%	33.1%	25.3%	10.1%	2.3%	6.9%
2018	9,490	5.0%	15.1%	33.4%	24.0%	12.8%	3.1%	6.6%
2019	16,276	5.1%	21.8%	29.8%	27.8%	7.5%	1.4%	6.5%
2020	11,490	6.6%	25.8%	28.8%	25.5%	5.6%	1.0%	6.8%
2021	12,026	6.0%	25.1%	28.4%	27.3%	6.0%	1.4%	5.8%
2022	12,173	5.2%	24.4%	27.7%	29.4%	5.9%	1.3%	6.0%
2023	14,933	3.8%	21.5%	27.9%	33.2%	6.2%	1.2%	6.2%
2024/06	6,151	3.8%	22.4%	27.3%	33.6%	5.5%	1.1%	6.3%

== See also ==
- Four-Stage Theory of the Republic of China
- Foreign relations of Taiwan
- One China Policy
- One country, two systems
- Taiwan independence Left
- History of the Republic of China
- China and the United Nations
- Taiwan and the United Nations
