= Retrocession Day =

Anniversary day commemorating the end of Japanese rule over Taiwan on 25 October 1945

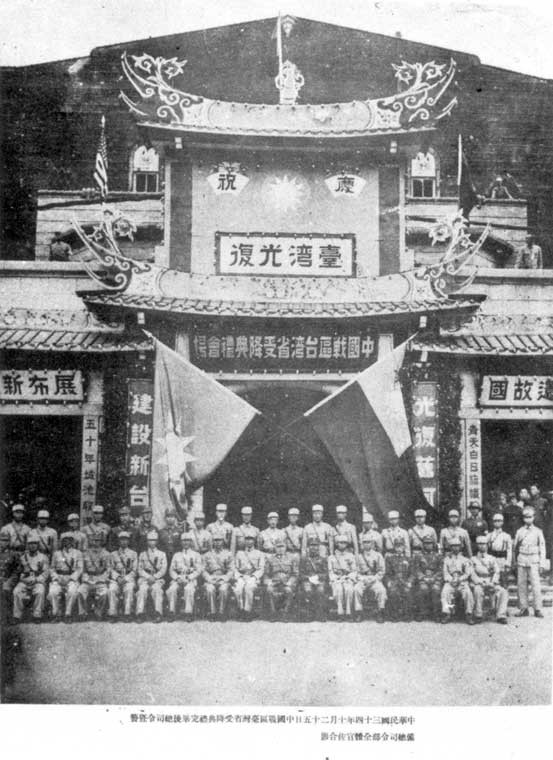
- Observed by: Republic of China (Taiwan) (as Taiwan Retrocession Day); People's Republic of China (as Commemoration Day of Taiwan's Restoration)
- Type: Historical, cultural, nationalist
- Significance: Commemorates the retrocession of and the end of the Japanese colonial rule in Taiwan
- Date: 25 October 1945
- Frequency: Annual

Chinese name
- Traditional Chinese: 臺灣光復節
- Simplified Chinese: 台湾光复节
Transcriptions
Standard Mandarin
- Hanyu Pinyin: Táiwān guāngfùjié
Hakka
- Romanization: Thòi-vân kông fu̍k chiet
Southern Min
- Tâi-lô: Tâi-uân kong-ho̍k tseh

Taiwan Recovery and Kinmen Guningtou Victory Memorial Day
- Traditional Chinese: 臺灣光復暨金門古寧頭大捷紀念日
- Simplified Chinese: 台湾光复暨金门古宁头大捷纪念日
Transcriptions
Standard Mandarin
- Hanyu Pinyin: Táiwān Guāngfùjì Jīnmén Gǔníngtóu Dàjié Jìniànrì

Commemoration Day of Taiwan's Restoration
- Traditional Chinese: 臺灣光復紀念日
- Simplified Chinese: 台湾光复纪念日
Transcriptions
Standard Mandarin
- Hanyu Pinyin: Táiwān Guāngfù Jìniànrì

Retrocession Day, officially called the Taiwan Retrocession Day and the Anniversary of the Battle of Guningtou, is a public holiday in the Republic of China (Taiwan), and from 2025 as a memorial day namely the Commemoration Day of Taiwan's Restoration in the People's Republic of China, to commemorate the end of Japanese rule of Taiwan and its transfer to the Republic of China on 25 October 1945.

== Background ==
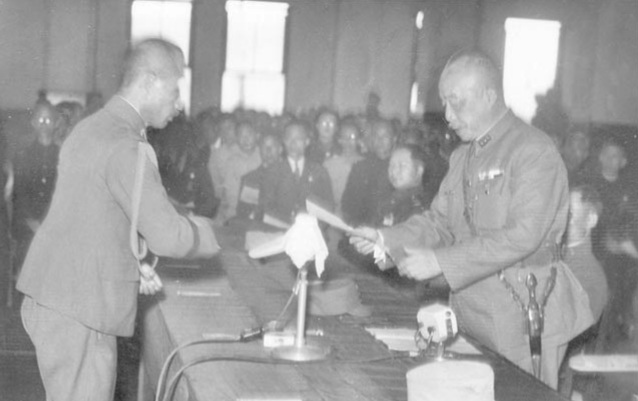
Chief Executive of Taiwan Province Chen Yi (right) accepting the receipt of Chen's Order No. 1 signed by Rikichi Andō (left), the last Japanese Governor-General of Taiwan, on behalf of the Republic of China Armed Forces at Taipei City Hall

Taiwan, then more commonly known to the Western world as "Formosa", became a colony of the Empire of Japan after the Qing dynasty lost the First Sino-Japanese War in 1894 and ceded the island with the 1895 Treaty of Shimonoseki. Japanese rule in Taiwan lasted until the end of World War II.

In November 1943, Chiang Kai-shek took part in the Cairo Conference with Franklin D. Roosevelt and Winston Churchill, who firmly advocated that Japan be required to return all of the territory it had annexed into its empire, including Taiwan and the Penghu (Pescadores) Islands. Article 8 of the Potsdam Declaration, drafted by the United States, United Kingdom, and China in July 1945, reiterated that the provisions of the Cairo Declaration be thoroughly carried out, and the Japanese Instrument of Surrender stated Japan's agreement to the terms of the Potsdam Proclamation.

Under the authorization of American General Douglas MacArthur's General Order No. 1, Chen Yi (Chief Executive of Taiwan Province) was escorted by George H. Kerr to Taiwan to accept the Japanese government's surrender as the Chinese delegate. When the Japanese surrendered at the end of World War II, General Rikichi Andō, governor-general of Taiwan and commander-in-chief of all Japanese forces on the island, signed a receipt of Order No. 1 and handed it over to Governor-General of Taiwan Chen Yi, representing the Republic of China Armed Forces to complete the official turnover in Taipei (known during occupation as Taihoku) on 25 October 1945, at Taipei City Public Auditorium (now Zhongshan Hall). Chen Yi proclaimed that day to be "Retrocession Day" and organized the island into the Taiwan Province of the Republic of China. Chen Yi's unilateral act, however, did not gain agreement from the US and the UK, for both considered Taiwan still under military occupation pending a peace treaty, though the US accepted Chinese authority over Taiwan at the time and viewed the Republic of China as the legal government of China. Taiwan has since been governed by the Government of the Republic of China.

== History ==
=== Taiwan ===
In October 1946, the Taiwan Provincial Government issued an order to designate this day as the "Recovery Day" for the first time and to declare a day off. Since then, this holiday has been included in the list of legal holidays of the Republic of China under the name of "Taiwan Recovery Day".

==== Revision in 2000 ====
The meaning of the holiday and whether it should be celebrated have been publicly debated following the period of martial law in Taiwan. In December 2000, Taiwan's government promulgated the revised "Regulations on the Implementation of Memorial Days and Holidays", which cancelled many holidays including Restoration Day.

==== 2025 reestablishment ====
In May 2025, the Legislative Yuan under the control of the Kuomintang passed the "Regulations for the Implementation of Memorial Days and Holidays" in its third reading, establishing the "Taiwan Retrocession Day and the Anniversary of the Battle of Guningtou" to merge Taiwan Restoration Day with the starting date of the Kinmen Guningtou victory on 25 October 1949 into the same memorial day to jointly commemorate two important events of historical significance to the Republic of China, and to restore holidays at the same time. Major Democratic Progressive Party (DPP) figures, such as Hsu Kuo-yung, spoke out against the reestablishment of the holiday. In 2025, the Taiwanese government announced that it would be made a public holiday in 2026.

=== People's Republic of China ===
On 24 October 2025, the Standing Committee of the National People's Congress of the People's Republic of China established the "Commemoration Day of Taiwan's Restoration" and stipulated that the country would hold commemorative activities, a decision which Taiwan Affairs Office director Song Tao said was done "personally" by General Secretary of the Chinese Communist Party Xi Jinping. The following day, Wang Huning, the chairman of the Chinese People's Political Consultative Conference, attended an event to mark the day, where he said mainland China and Taiwan should "work together to advance the cause of national reunification and must leave no room for any form of 'Taiwan independence' separatist activities". PRC government sources and allied think tanks have described the holiday as an opportunity to conduct lawfare and "historical narrative warfare" (Chinese: 历史论述战) in support of Chinese unification.

==== Responses ====
Taiwan's Mainland Affairs Council called the PRC's designation of the holiday in mainland China an attempt to "belittle our country and fabricate the claim that Taiwan belongs to the PRC." Taiwan barred its officials and students from attending celebratory events for the day in the PRC. The DPP, Taiwanese independence groups, and some commentators see the PRC's holiday as an attempt to revise history and create uncertainty about the political status of Taiwan for the purpose of advancing pro-unification narratives.

In some major cities in the United States, united front groups, such as the China Council for the Promotion of Peaceful National Reunification, and various overseas Chinese hometown associations have organized celebrations of the day.

== See also ==
- Political status of Taiwan
- Public holidays in Taiwan
- Theory of the Undetermined Status of Taiwan
- Victory over Japan Day
- Zhongshan Hall
- National Liberation Day of Korea
