= 光復節 =

"光復節" is a term in Chinese that means "restoration" or "retrocession", and may refer to:

- Gwangbokjeol in Korea
- Retrocession Day in Taiwan
- Restoration of Independence Day in Portugal
