= Theory of the Undetermined Status of Taiwan =

Legal theory about the island of Taiwan

The Theory of the Undetermined Status of Taiwan (Chinese: 台灣地位未定論; pinyin: Táiwān dìwèi wèidìng lùn), also called the Theory of the Undetermined Sovereignty of Taiwan (Chinese: 台灣主權未定論; pinyin: Táiwān zhǔquán wèidìng lùn), is one of the theories which describe the island of Taiwan's present legal status.

== History ==
In 1950, after the outbreak of the Korean War, United States president Harry S. Truman said that it would be a direct threat to the United States' security in the western Pacific area if the Communist forces occupied Taiwan and that "the determination of the future status of Formosa must await the restoration of security in the Pacific, a peace settlement with Japan, or consideration by the United Nations." This statement of Truman is generally regarded as the origin of the Theory of the Undetermined Status of Taiwan.

In 1951, Japan concluded the Treaty of San Francisco with the Allied Powers. It renounced all right, title and claim to Taiwan and the Pescadores without explicitly stating the sovereignty status of the two territories.

== Positions ==
The Theory of the Undetermined Status of Taiwan is supported by some politicians and jurists to this day.

The theory is strongly rejected by the People's Republic of China. In October 2025, an article titled "The Origin and Nature of the Taiwan Issue", published by Xinhua News Agency under the byline Zhong Tai Wen, said that "At this point (October 25, 1945), China had legally and factually recovered Taiwan. Taiwan has been liberated and returned to China, and the issue of its status has been completely resolved". Due to the absence of China from the Treaty of San Francisco, the People's Republic of China considers the treaty to be illegal and illegitimate. Instead, it views the Cairo Declaration and the Potsdam Declaration to have settled the status of Taiwan as part of China.

== Kinmen and Matsu ==
The theory does not apply to Kinmen or the Matsu Islands, which are also controlled by the government of the Republic of China. In particular, three of the five major Matsu Islands (Dongyin Island, Dongju Island, and Xiju Island) have been continuously controlled by this government since the overthrow of the Qing Empire in 1912, while Kinmen and the other two major Matsu Islands have been controlled except for a period of occupation in World War II.

== See also ==
- General Order No. 1
- Occupation of Japan
- Treaty of San Francisco
- Treaty of Taipei
- Political status of Taiwan
- History of Taiwan
- Retrocession of Taiwan
