= 1943 Cairo Declaration =

Outcome of the 1943 Cairo Conference

Generalissimo Chiang Kai-shek, President Franklin D. Roosevelt, and Prime Minister Winston Churchill met at the Cairo Conference in Cairo, 25 November 1943.

The Cairo Declaration (Chinese: 開羅宣言) was the outcome of the Cairo Conference in Cairo, Egypt, on 27 November 1943 of the 3 Allied powers engaged in the Second World war against the "Axis" of Germany and Japan, represented by President Franklin Roosevelt of the United States, Prime Minister Winston Churchill of the United Kingdom, and Generalissimo Chiang Kai-shek of the Republic of China.

The declaration developed ideas from the 1941 Atlantic Charter, which was issued by the Allies of World War II to set goals for the post-war order. The Cairo Communiqué was broadcast through radio on 1 December 1943.

== Text ==
The several military missions have agreed upon future military operations against Japan. The Three Great Allies expressed their resolve to bring unrelenting pressure against their brutal enemies by sea, land, and air. This pressure is already rising.

The Three Great Allies are fighting this war to restrain and punish the aggression of Japan. They covet no gain for themselves and have no thought of territorial expansion. It is their purpose that Japan shall be stripped of all the islands in the Pacific which she has seized or occupied since the beginning of the first World War in 1914, and that all the territories Japan has stolen from the Chinese, such as Manchuria, Formosa, and The Pescadores, shall be restored to the Republic of China. Japan will also be expelled from all other territories which she has taken by violence and greed. The aforesaid three great powers, mindful of the enslavement of the people of Korea, are determined that in due course Korea shall become free and independent.

With these objects in view the three Allies, in harmony with those of the United Nations at war with Japan, will continue to persevere in the serious and prolonged operations necessary to procure the unconditional surrender of Japan.

== Controversy as to Taiwan ==
The Cairo Declaration is cited in Clause Eight (8) of the Potsdam Declaration, which is referred to by the Japanese Instrument of Surrender.

Both the People's Republic of China and the Republic of China have cited the Cairo Declaration as one of the bases for the One China principle that Taiwan and Penghu are part of Republic of China. However, some of the pro-independence advocates in Taiwan have not taken the same position on this matter, arguing instead that the Cairo Declaration was not binding, or gives the false impression that Taiwan and China should be unified like Germany or Vietnam.

Due to the Chinese Civil War that immediately broke out after WWII, it became unclear which Chinese government Taiwan should be returned to. The government of the United States considers the declaration a statement of intention and never formally implemented. In November 1950, the United States Department of State said that no formal act restoring sovereignty over Formosa and the Pescadores to China had yet occurred. Similarly, in February 1955, Winston Churchill stated that the Cairo Declaration "contained merely a statement of common purpose" and the question of Taiwan's future sovereignty was left undetermined by the Japanese peace treaty. British officials reiterated this viewpoint in May 1955.

In March 1961, then-Japanese Minister for Foreign Affairs responded that:

It was specified in Potsdam Proclamation that articles in Cairo Declaration should be carried out, and in accordance with Japanese Instrument of Surrender we announced that we would comply with Potsdam Proclamation. However, the so-called Japanese Instrument of Surrender possesses the nature of armistice and does not possess the nature of territorial disposition.

On the other hand, then-ROC president Ma Ying-jeou cited a series of instruments beginning with the Cairo Declaration and stated in 2014:

The implementation of the legal obligation to return Taiwan and its appertaining islands (including the Diaoyutai Islands) to the ROC was first stipulated in the Cairo Declaration, and later reaffirmed in the Potsdam Proclamation, the Japanese Instrument of Surrender, the San Francisco Peace Treaty, and the Treaty of Peace between the Republic of China and Japan. The Cairo Declaration is therefore a legally binding instrument with treaty status.

== Controversy as to Korea ==
Many prominent Koreans in the Korean independence movement, including Kim Ku and Syngman Rhee, were initially delighted by the declaration, but later noticed and became infuriated by the phrase "in due course". They took it to be an affirmation of Allied intent to place Korea into a trusteeship, rather than granting it immediate independence. There was significant concern that the trusteeship could be indefinite or last decades, making Korea functionally again a colony under a great power.

The phrase "in due course" was not present in the first draft; it originally read "at the earliest possible moment after the downfall of Japan". The US suggested "at the proper moment", and finally the British "in due time". Exact motivations for these changes are unclear.

== See also ==
- Cairo Conference (1943)
- Potsdam Declaration (July 1945)
- General Order No. 1 (August 1945)
- Japanese Instrument of Surrender (September 1945)
- Korea Retrocession (August 1945)
- Taiwan Retrocession (October 1945)
- Treaty of San Francisco (1951)
- Cairo Declaration (film)
