= General Order No. 1 =

US military order to the Empire of Japan

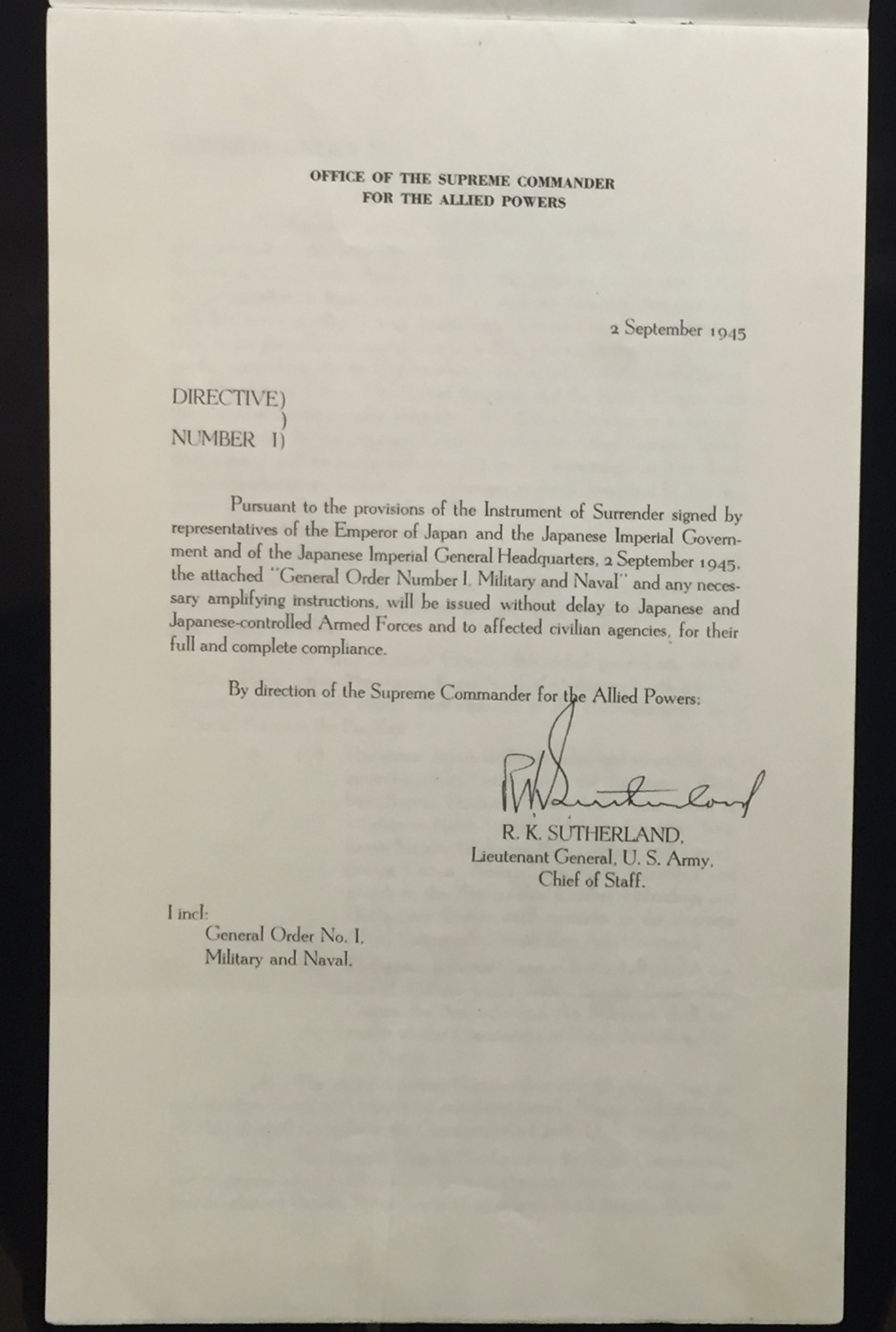
General Order No.1 cover letter preserved at the Diplomatic Archives of the Ministry of Foreign Affairs of Japan (4 Sept. 2015)

General Order No. 1 for the surrender of Japan was prepared by the United States Joint Chiefs of Staff and approved by President Harry Truman on August 17, 1945.

It was issued by General Douglas MacArthur to the representative of the Empire of Japan following the surrender of Japan, and then issued by Japanese Imperial General Headquarters to the forces of the Empire of Japan on 2 September 1945. It instructed Japanese forces to surrender to designated Allied commanders, reveal all current military deployments, and preserve military equipment for later disarmament. It also specified the occupation of Japan and Japanese-controlled areas by forces of the Allied Powers.

It also led to the eventual division of Korea at the 38th Parallel in that Japanese forces to the north of this parallel were ordered to surrender to the Commander in Chief of Soviet Forces in the Far East, and those to the south were directed to surrender to the Commander in Chief, U.S. Army Forces in the Pacific, in accordance with Section 1, paragraphs (b) and (e), respectively.

== See also ==
- Cairo Declaration (27 November 1943)
- Potsdam Declaration (26 July 1945)
- Hirohito surrender broadcast (15 August 1945)
- National Liberation Day of Korea (15 August 1945)
- Japanese Instrument of Surrender (2 September 1945)
- Retrocession Day (25 October 1945)
- Treaty of San Francisco (8 September 1951)

== Bibliography ==
- United States Department of State (1945). "Foreign relations of the United States : diplomatic papers, 1945. The British Commonwealth, the Far East". Foreign Relations of the United States (FRUS). United States Government Printing Office. pp. 635–639.
