= Outline of Taiwan =

Country in East Asia

The flag of the Republic of China

The National Emblem of the Republic of China

Location in East Asia

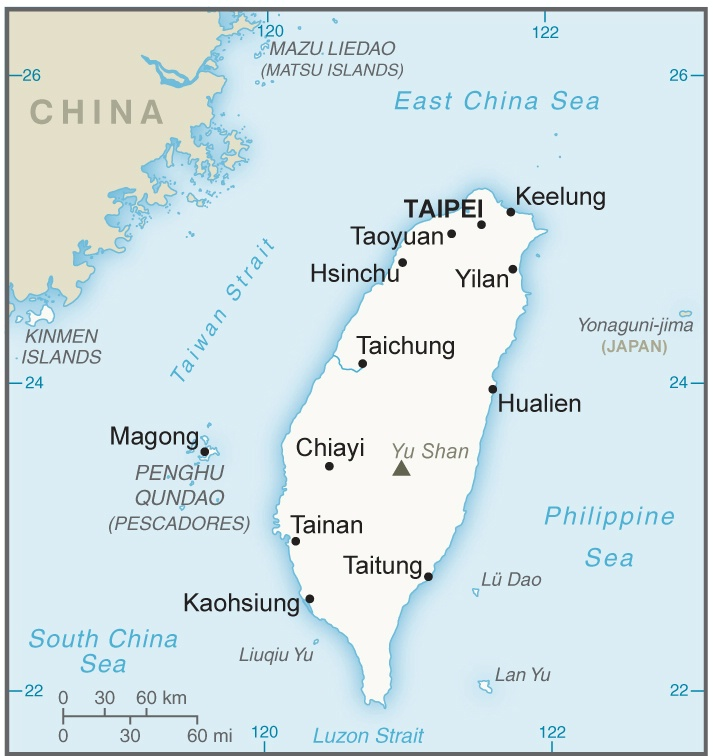
Political map of Taiwan

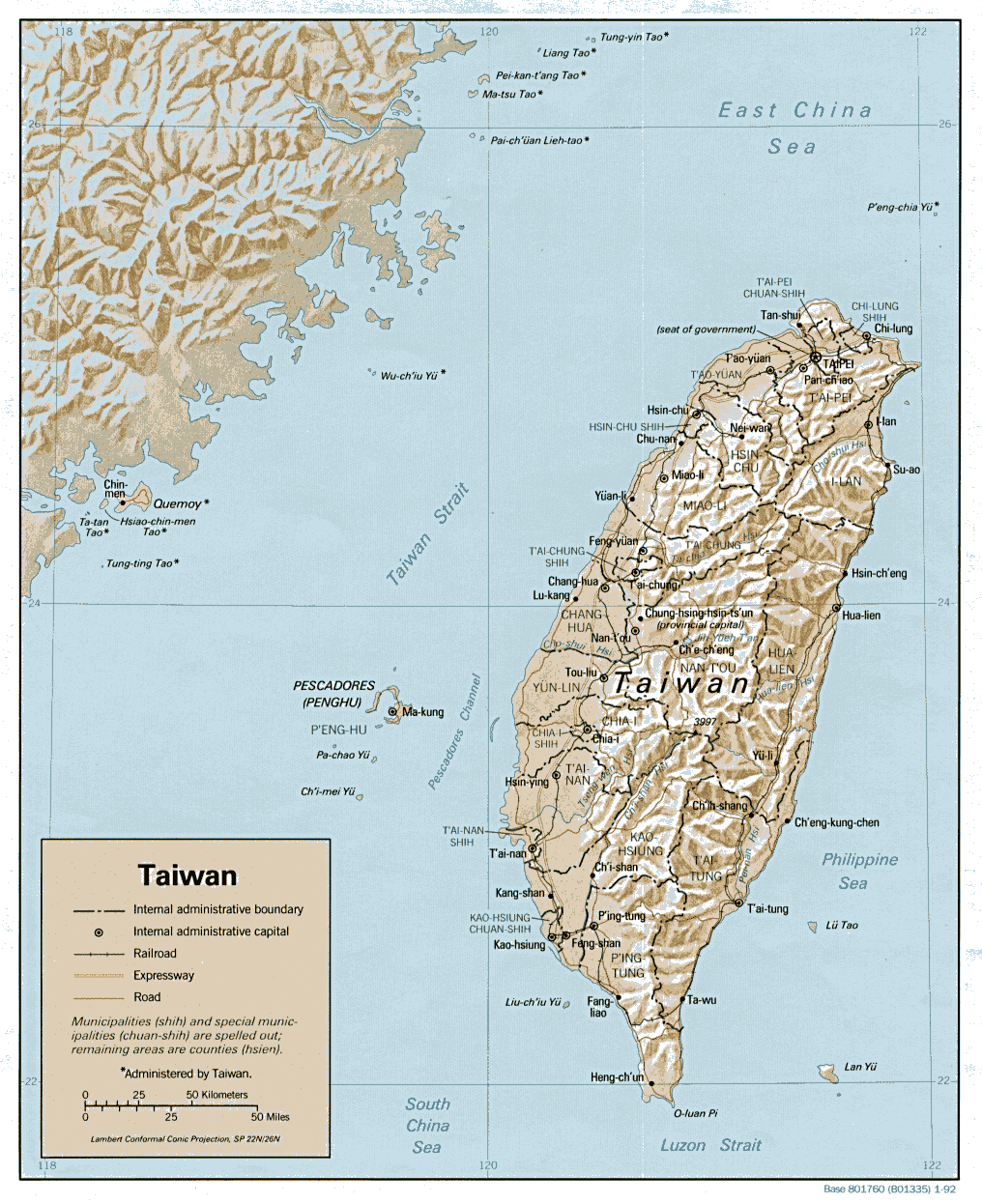
Relief map of Taiwan

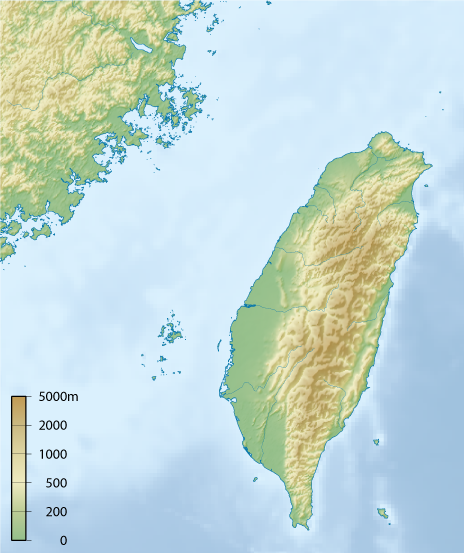
Topographic map of Taiwan

The following outline is provided as an overview of and topical guide to Taiwan:

Taiwan – a country in East Asia, officially named the Republic of China (ROC). Originally based in mainland China, the ROC now governs the island of Taiwan, which makes up over 99% of its territory, as well as Penghu, Kinmen, Matsu, and other minor islands. Taipei is the seat of the central government. Following the Chinese Civil War, the Chinese Communist Party took full control of mainland China and founded the People's Republic of China (PRC) in 1949. The ROC relocated its government to Taiwan, and its jurisdiction became limited to Taiwan and its surrounding islands. In 1971, the PRC assumed China's seat at the United Nations, which the ROC originally occupied. During the latter half of the 20th century, Taiwan experienced rapid economic growth and industrialization and is now an advanced industrial economy. In the 1980s and early 1990s, Taiwan evolved into a democracy with universal suffrage. Taiwan is one of the Four Asian Tigers and a member of the WTO and APEC. The 19th-largest economy in the world, its high tech industry plays a key role in the global economy.

== General reference ==
- Pronunciation: /ˈtaɪˈwɑːn/
  - Mandarin: [tʰai˧˥u̯an˥]
  - Min Nan Chinese: [tai˨wan˨˥]
- Common English state names: Taiwan; archaic Formosa
- Official English state names: Republic of China
- Common endonym(s): 臺灣 (Táiwān; Tâi-oân)
- Official endonym(s): 臺灣 – 中華民國 (Zhōnghuá Mínguó; Tiong-hôa Bîn-kok)
- Adjectival(s): Taiwanese (disambiguation)
- Demonym(s): Taiwanese
- Etymology: Taiwan#Name
- International rankings of Taiwan
- ISO country codes: TW, TWN, 158
- ISO region codes: See ISO 3166-2:TW
- Internet country code top-level domain: .tw

== Geography of Taiwan ==
- Taiwan is:
  - a common name used for the Republic of China since the 1970s, to avoid confusion with the People's Republic of China (commonly known as China)
  - also the name of the Island of Taiwan (Formosa)
- Location:
  - Northern Hemisphere and Eastern Hemisphere
  - Eurasia (but not on the mainland)
    - Asia
      - East Asia
  - Pacific Ocean
    - East China Sea
    - Philippine Sea
      - Bashi Channel
    - South China Sea
      - Taiwan Strait
  - Time zone: National Standard Time (UTC+08:00)
  - Extreme points of Taiwan
    - High: Yushan 3,952 m (12,966 ft)
    - Low: Pacific Ocean 0 m
  - Land boundaries: none
  - Coastline: 1,566 km
- Population of Taiwan: 23,503,349 people (May 2016 estimate) - 58th most populous country
- Area of Taiwan: 36,193 km^{2} (13,974 sq mi) - 134th largest country
- Atlas of Taiwan

=== Environment of Taiwan ===
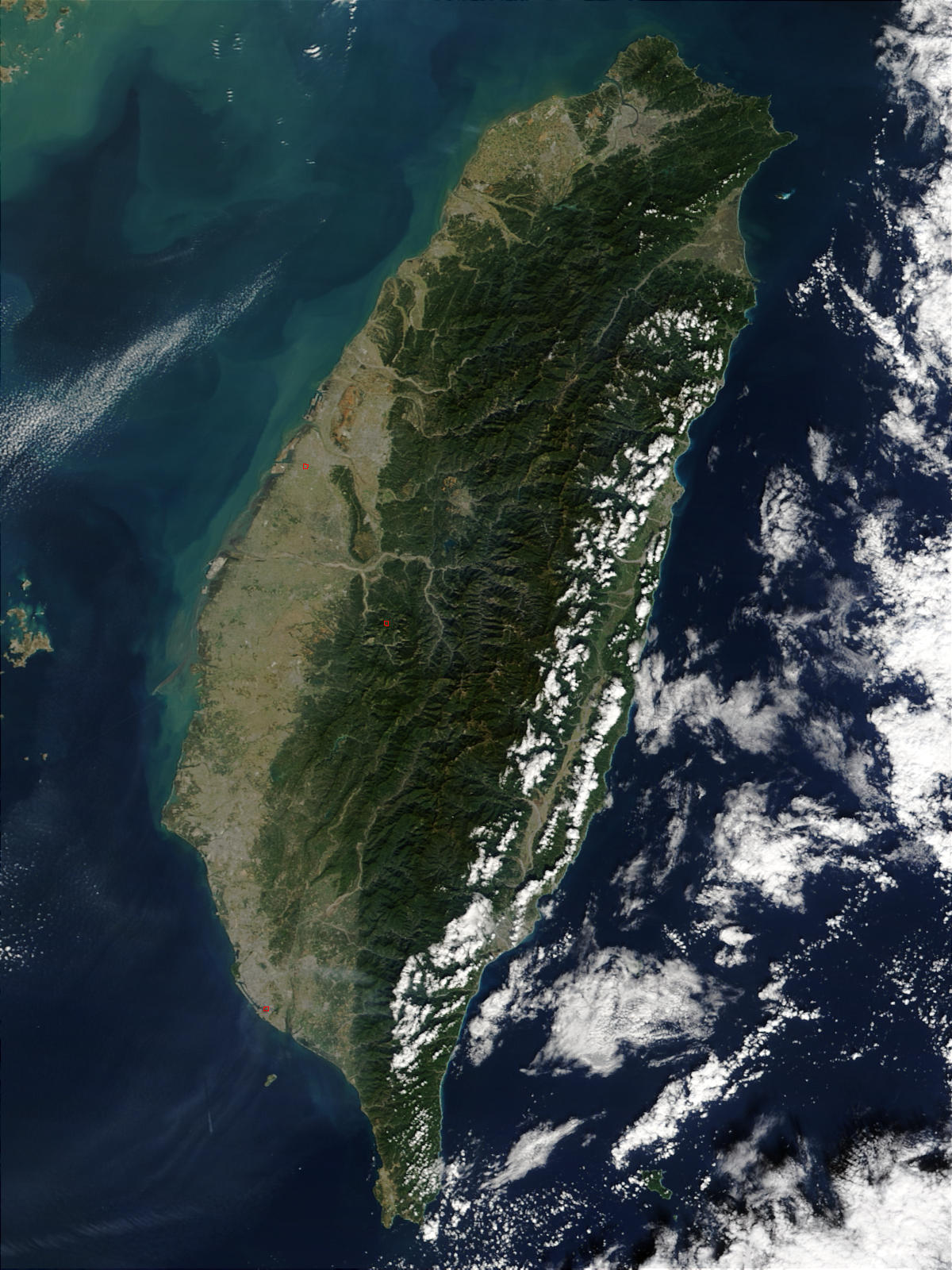
Satellite photograph of Taiwan taken by MODIS aboard NASA's Terra satellite.

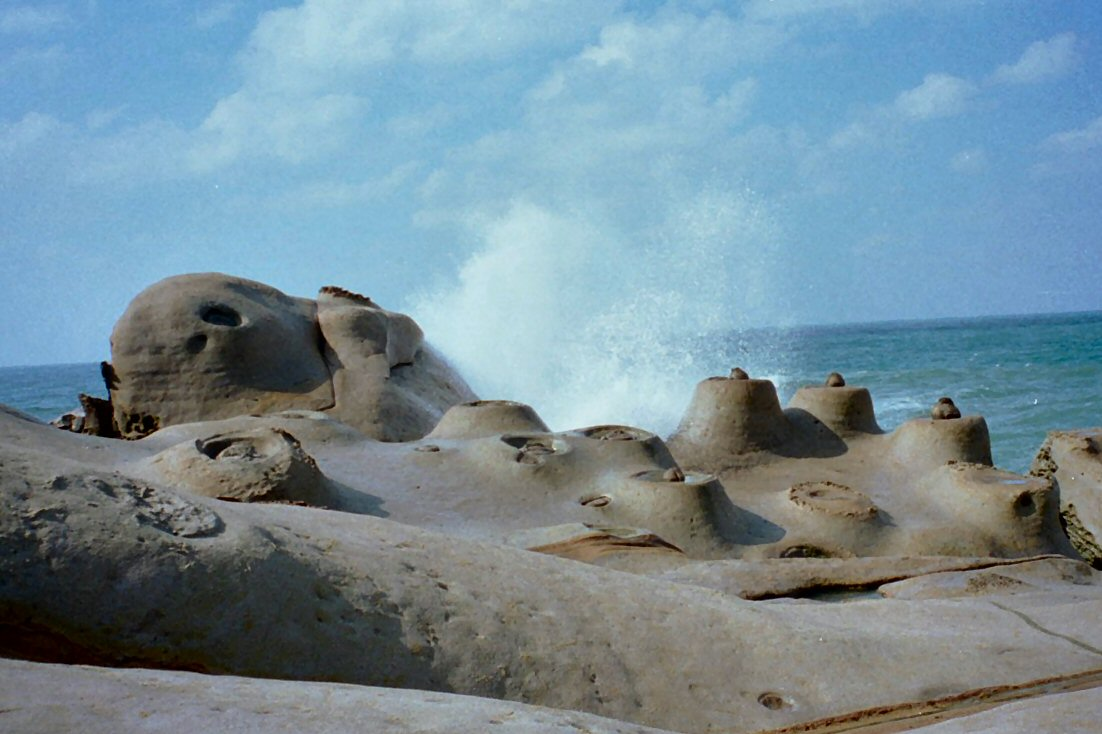
Yehliu is a peninsula on the north coast of Taiwan, famous for the curious shapes carved along its shoreline by sea erosion.

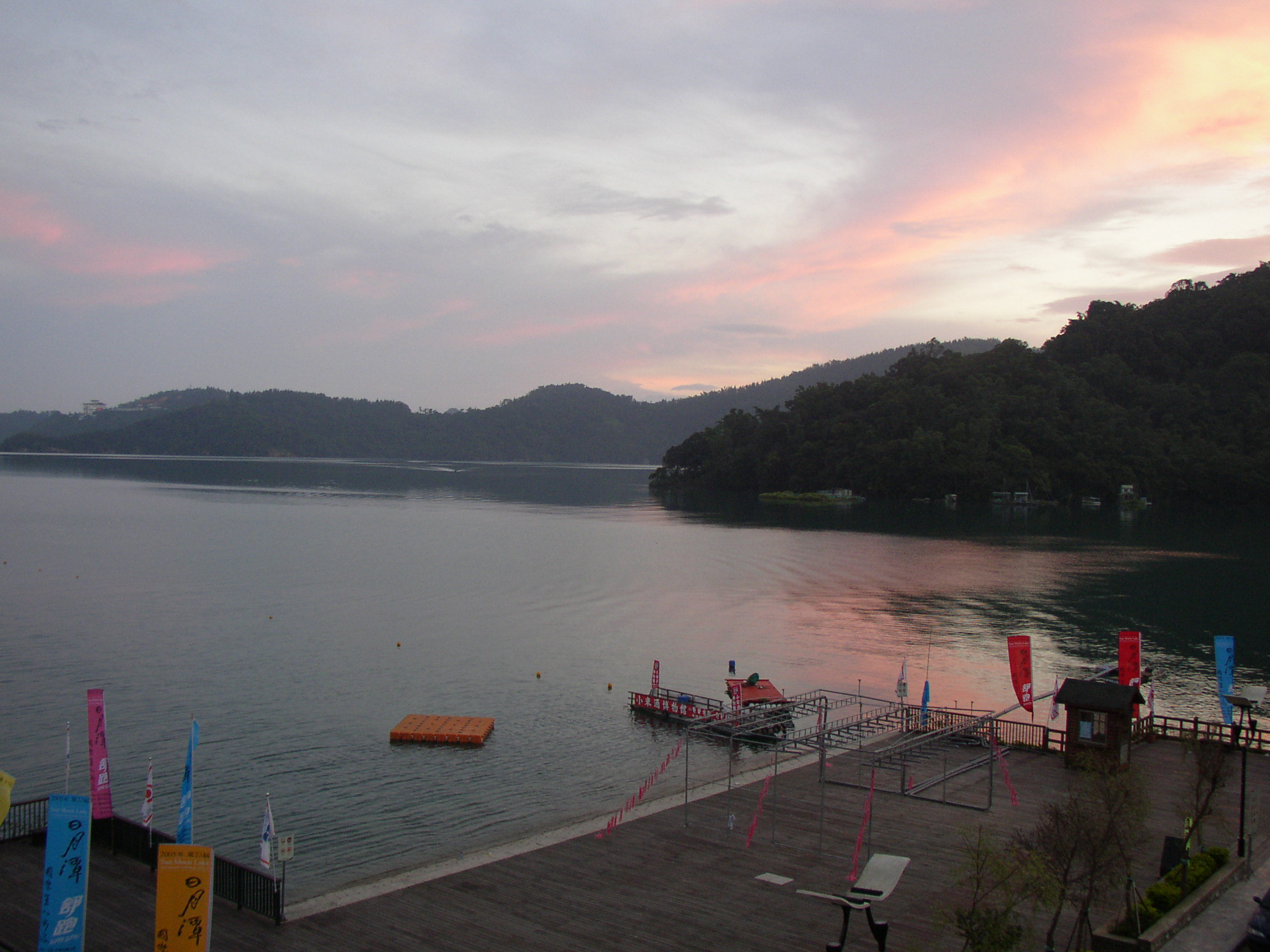
Sun Moon Lake

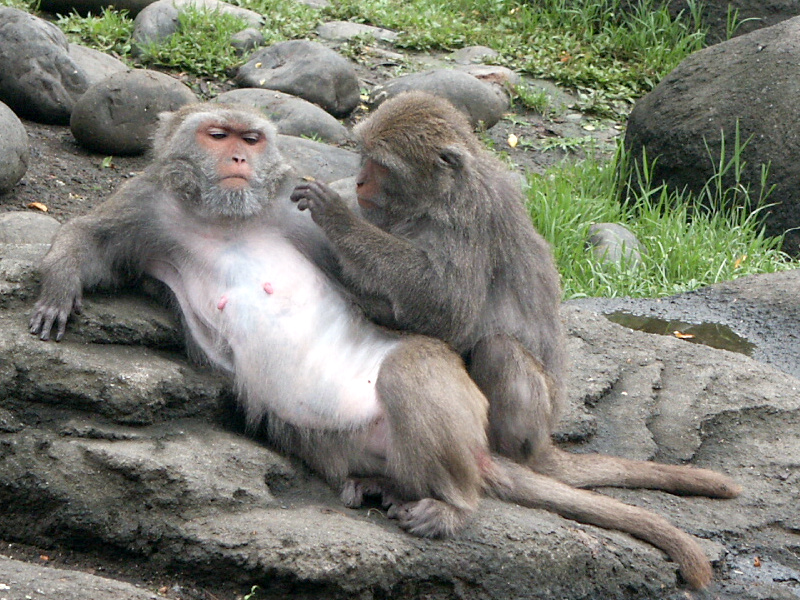
Formosan rock macaques, an endemic species of Taiwan.

- Climate of Taiwan
- Geology of Taiwan
- National parks of Taiwan
- Wildlife of Taiwan
  - Endemic species of Taiwan
  - Fauna of Taiwan
    - Birds of Taiwan
    - Mammals of Taiwan
      - Formosan rock macaque
  - Flora of Taiwan

==== Geographic features of Taiwan ====
- Hot springs in Taiwan - Taiwan has one of the highest concentrations of hot springs in the World.
- Islands of Taiwan
  - Taiwan
- Mountains in Taiwan
  - Volcanoes in Taiwan
- Rivers in Taiwan
- Taiwan Strait
- World Heritage Sites in Taiwan: None

=== Regions of Taiwan ===
- Alishan National Scenic Area
- Metropolitan areas in Taiwan

==== Ecoregions of Taiwan ====
- South Taiwan monsoon rain forests
- Taiwan subtropical evergreen forests

==== Administrative divisions of Taiwan ====
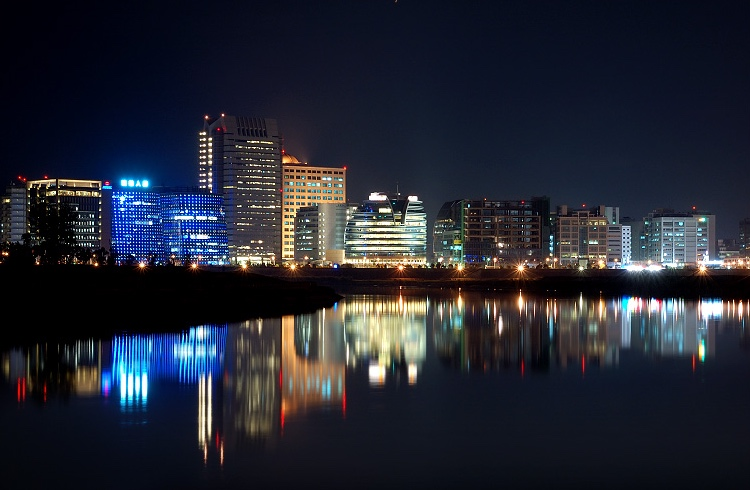
Taipei Neihu Technology Park.

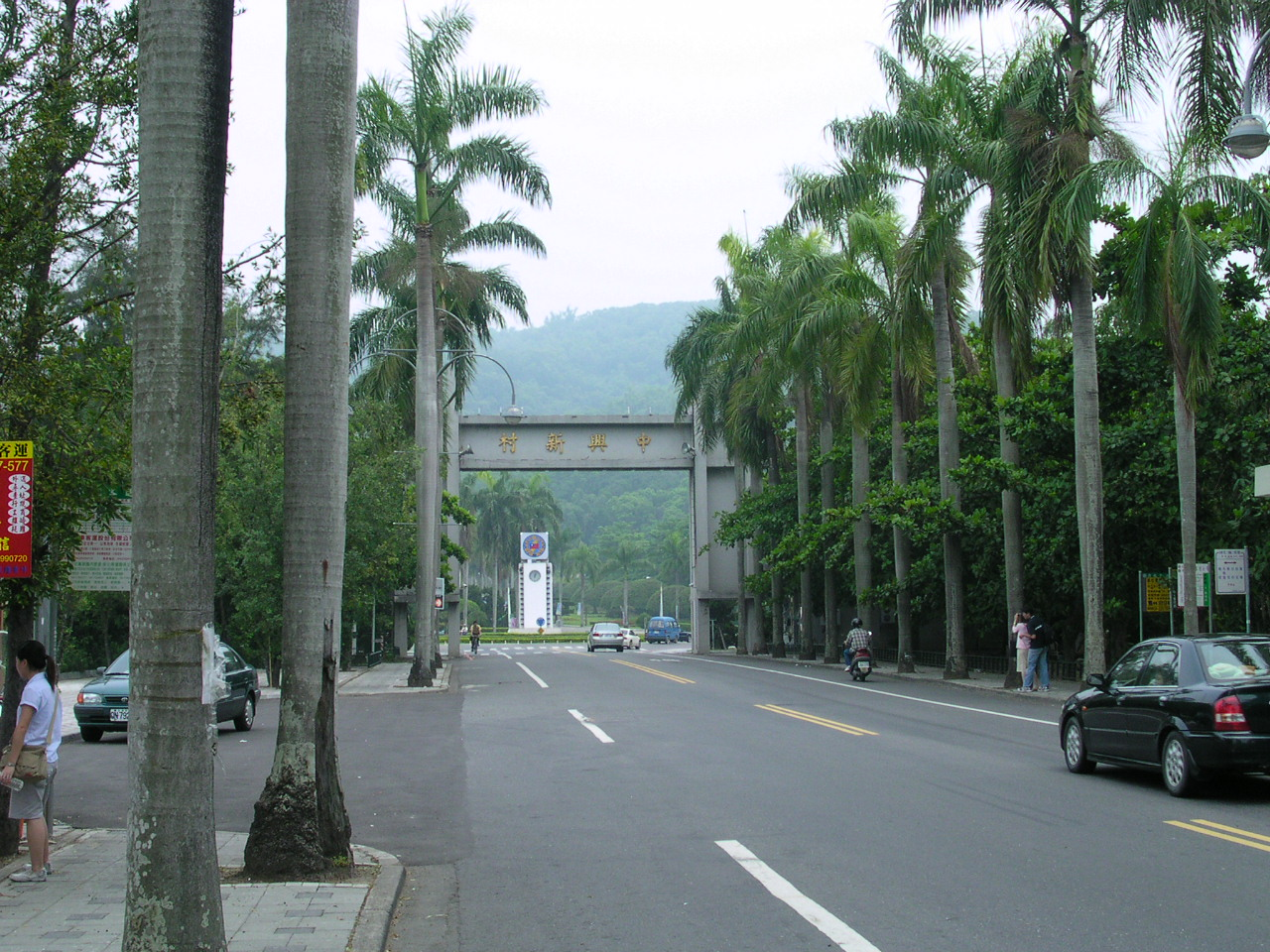
A paifang in Zhongxing New Village. Zhongxing New Village was the capital of the now-defunct Taiwan Province.

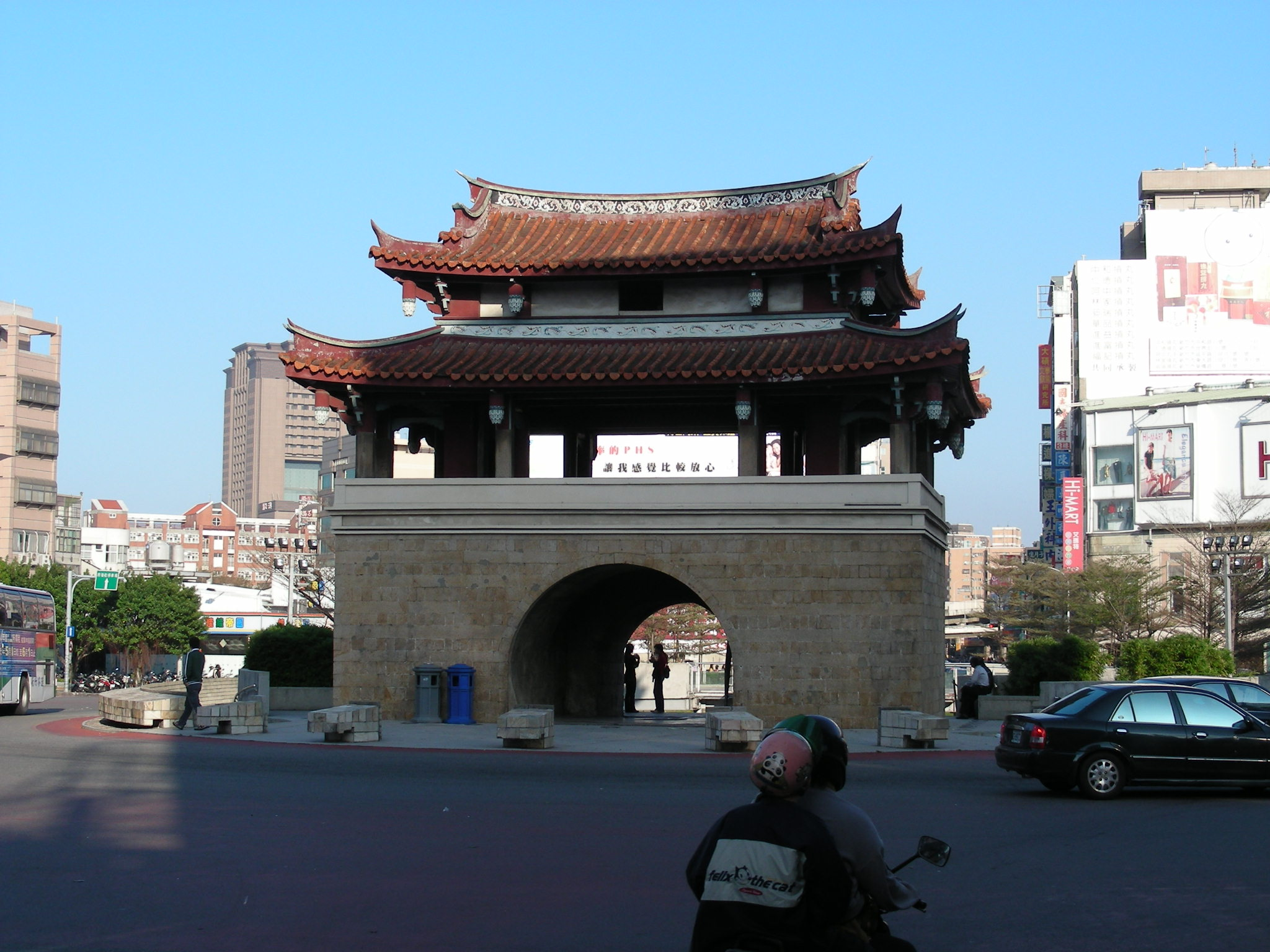
East Gate of Hsinchu City.

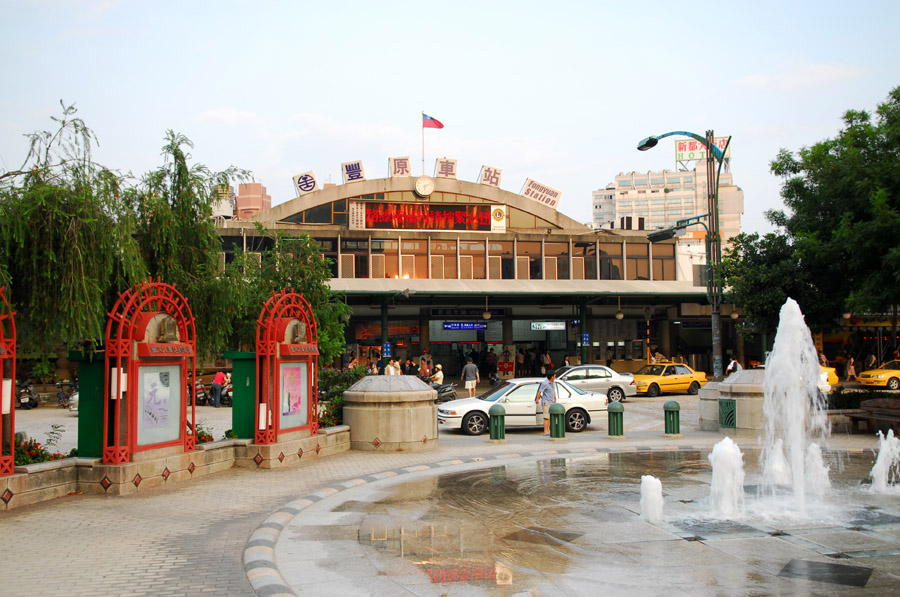
Fengyuan Station is a train station of Taichung Line, part of Taiwan's Western main rail line. It's the main station of Fengyuan District, Taichung City.

- Administrative division types
  - Special municipalities (6) and Provincial cities (3)
    - Districts (170)
  - Counties (13)
    - County-administered cities (14) and Townships (184)
- Six special municipalities: Kaohsiung, New Taipei, Taichung, Tainan, Taipei, and Taoyuan.
- Three provincial cities: Chiayi, Hsinchu, Keelung.
- 13 counties: Changhua, Chiayi, Hsinchu, Hualien, Kinmen, Lienchiang, Miaoli, Nantou, Penghu, Pingtung, Taitung, Yilan and Yunlin.
- List of cities in Taiwan

== Government and politics of Taiwan ==
- Form of government: semi-presidential representative democratic republic
- Capital of the Republic of China: Taipei

=== Elections in Taiwan ===
- Presidential elections in Taiwan
  - 1996 - 2000 - 2004 - 2008 - 2012 - 2016 - 2020 - 2024
- Legislative elections in Taiwan
  - Legislative Yuan: 1969 - 1972 - 1975 - 1980 - 1983 - 1986 - 1989 - 1992 - 1995 - 1998 - 2001 - 2004 - 2008 - 2012 - 2016 - 2020 - 2024
  - National Assembly: 1969 - 1972 - 1980 - 1986 - 1991 - 1996 - 2005 (defunct)
- Referendums in Taiwan

=== Taiwan policy and ideology ===
- Taiwanization and Desinicization
  - Taiwanese nationalism
  - Tangwai
  - Taiwan independence movement
  - Formosan League for Reemancipation
- Sinicization
  - Chinese nationalism
  - Three Principles of the People
  - Chinese unification
- Iron rice bowl
- Iron vote
- Irredentism
- 228 Hand-in-Hand Rally

=== Political parties ===
==== Nationally represented parties ====
- Democratic Progressive Party
- Kuomintang
- New Power Party
- People First Party (Taiwan)
- Non-Partisan Solidarity Union

==== Other parties ====
- Civil Party (Taiwan)
- Green Party Taiwan
- Minkuotang
- Natural Law Party
- New Party (Taiwan)
- Peasant Party (Taiwan)
- Taiwan Independence Party
- Taiwan Solidarity Union
- Trees Party

=== Branches of government ===
The government of the Republic of China has five branches, called "yuan".

==== Leadership ====
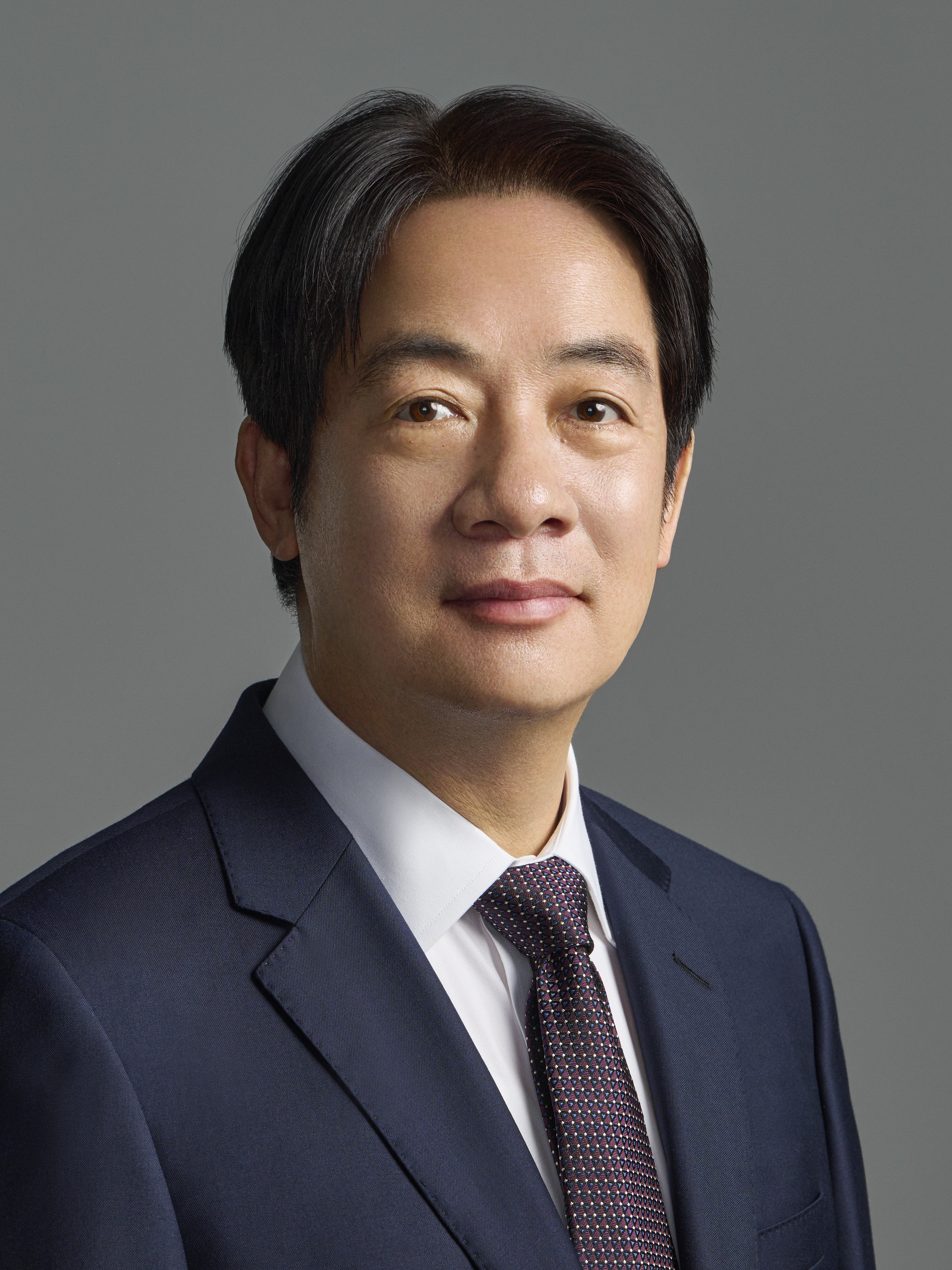
Lai Ching-te, President of the Republic of China.

- Head of state: President, Lai Ching-te
  - Vice President: Hsiao Bi-khim

==== Executive Yuan ====
- Head of government: Premier of the Republic of China, Cho Jung-tai
- The Cabinet (Executive Yuan)
  - Ministry of the Interior
  - Ministry of Foreign Affairs
  - Ministry of National Defense
  - Ministry of Finance
  - Ministry of Education
  - Ministry of Justice
  - Ministry of Economic Affairs
  - Ministry of Transportation and Communications
  - Ministry of Labor
  - Ministry of Health and Welfare
  - Ministry of Culture
  - Ministry of Digital Affairs
  - Ministry of Agriculture
  - Ministry of Environment

==== Legislative Yuan ====
- Legislative Yuan is a unicameral parliament

==== Judicial Yuan ====
- Supreme Court of the Republic of China

=== Foreign relations of Taiwan ===
- Cross-Strait relations
  - Chinese unification
  - Chinese Taipei
  - One Country on Each Side
- Diplomatic missions of Taiwan
- Four Noes and One Without
- Four-Stage Theory of the Republic of China
- Free Area of the Republic of China
- ISO 3166-2:TW
- List of Chinese Taipei Representatives to APEC
- Political status of Taiwan
- Sino-Pacific relations
- Taiwan independence movement
- Taiwan passport
- Taiwan-United States relations
  - American Institute in Taiwan
  - Six Assurances
  - Taiwan Relations Act
- Visa policy of Taiwan

==== International organization membership ====
The Republic of China is a member of:

- Asian Development Bank (ADB) (as Chinese Taipei)
- Asia-Pacific Economic Cooperation (APEC) (as Chinese Taipei)
- Central American Bank for Economic Integration (BCIE)
- International Chamber of Commerce (ICC) (as Chinese Taipei)
- International Olympic Committee (IOC) (as Chinese Taipei)
- International Trade Union Confederation (ITUC) (as Chinese Taipei)
- World Confederation of Labour (WCL)
- World Federation of Trade Unions (WFTU)
- World Trade Organization (WTO) (as Separate Customs Territory of Taiwan, Penghu, Kinmen, and Matsu, "Chinese Taipei")

The Republic of China is excluded from:

- United Nations
  - The Republic of China was a founding member of the UN, but withdrew in 1971 after the UNGA Resolution 2758 was proposed which was in favor of representation for the PRC.
  - On 23 July 2007, the Republic of China's (15th) request to join the UN was rejected.

=== Law and order ===
- Capital punishment in Taiwan
- Constitution of the Republic of China
- Corporal punishment in Taiwan
- Human rights in Taiwan
  - LGBT rights in Taiwan
  - Intersex rights in Taiwan
  - Freedom of religion in Taiwan
- Identification in Taiwan
- Law enforcement in Taiwan
  - Coast Guard Administration
  - National Police Agency

=== Political/legal status of Taiwan ===
- Chinese unification
- Political status of Taiwan
- Taiwan cession
- Taiwan independence

=== Legal documentation of Taiwan status ===
- Treaty of Shimonoseki
- Cairo Conference
- Potsdam Declaration
- Treaty of Peace with Japan
- Treaty of Taipei
- General Order No. 1
- Japanese Instrument of Surrender
- Charter of the United Nations
- Yalta Conference
- Shanghai Communique

=== Military ===
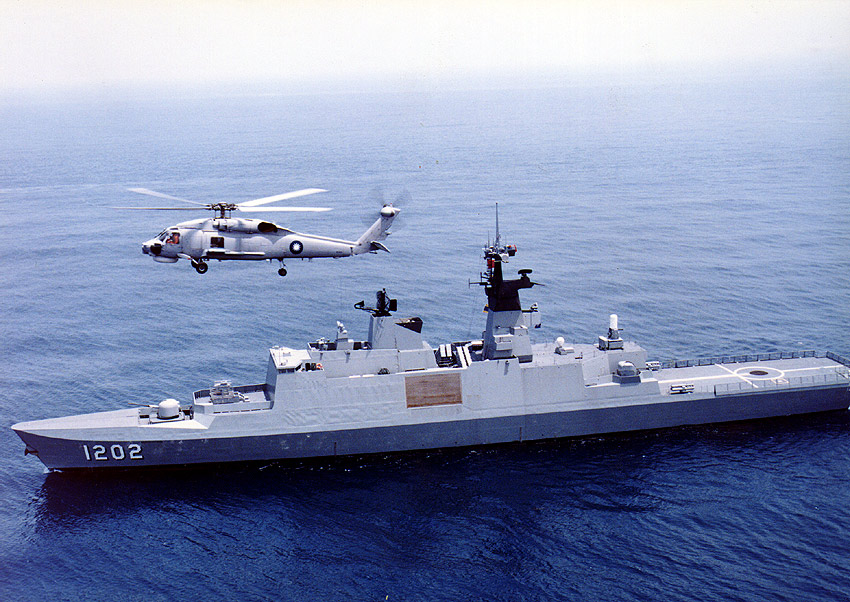
ROC Navy Kang Ding-class (Lafayette-class) frigate with S-70C helicopter.

- Command
  - Commander-in-chief: Lai Ching-te
    - Ministry of National Defense
- Conscription in Taiwan
- Forces
  - Republic of China Army
  - Republic of China Navy
    - Republic of China Marine Corps
  - Republic of China Air Force
  - Republic of China Military Police
- Military ranks of the Republic of China

=== Politicians ===
- Annette Lu
- John Chang
- Morris Chang
- Chen Shui-bian
- Chiang Ching-kuo
- Chiang Kai-shek
- Chu Mei-feng
- Frank Hsieh
- Evonne Hsu
- Katsura Taro
- Lee Teng-hui
- Lee Yuan-tseh
- Li Ao
- Lien Chan
- Ma Ying-jeou
- Pai Hsien-yung
- Peng Ming-min
- James Soong
- Sisy Chen
- Soong Mei-ling
- Su Tseng-chang
- Wang Jin-pyng
- Wang Yung-ching
- Yen Chia-kan
- Yu Shyi-kun

== History of Taiwan ==
- Archaeological sites
- February 28 Incident
- 32 Demands
- Kaohsiung Incident
- Koxinga
- Timeline of Taiwanese history
  - Timeline of diplomatic relations of Taiwan

=== By period ===
==== Mainland before 1949 ====
- Economic history of China
- Military history of China (pre-1911)
- List of earthquakes in China

==== Taiwan ====
- Prehistory 50000 BCE – 1540 CE
- Dapenkeng culture 4000 BCE – 2500 BCE
- Kingdom of Middag 1540–1732
- Dutch Formosa 1624–1662
- Spanish Formosa 1626–1642
- Kingdom of Tungning 1661–1683
- Qing Taiwan 1683–1895
- Republic of Taiwan 1895
- Japanese Taiwan 1895–1945
- Taiwanese Communist Party
- Post-War Taiwan 1945–present

=== By region ===
- History of Kaohsiung
- History of Taipei

=== By subject ===
- Cultural history
- Economic history
- Educational history
- Military history of Taiwan
  - First Taiwan Strait Crisis
  - Second Taiwan Strait Crisis
  - Third Taiwan Strait Crisis
  - Civil Air Transport
- Political history

==== Historical figures ====
- Rulers of Taiwan
- Thomas Barclay (missionary)
- George Leslie Mackay
- James Laidlaw Maxwell

== Culture of Taiwan ==
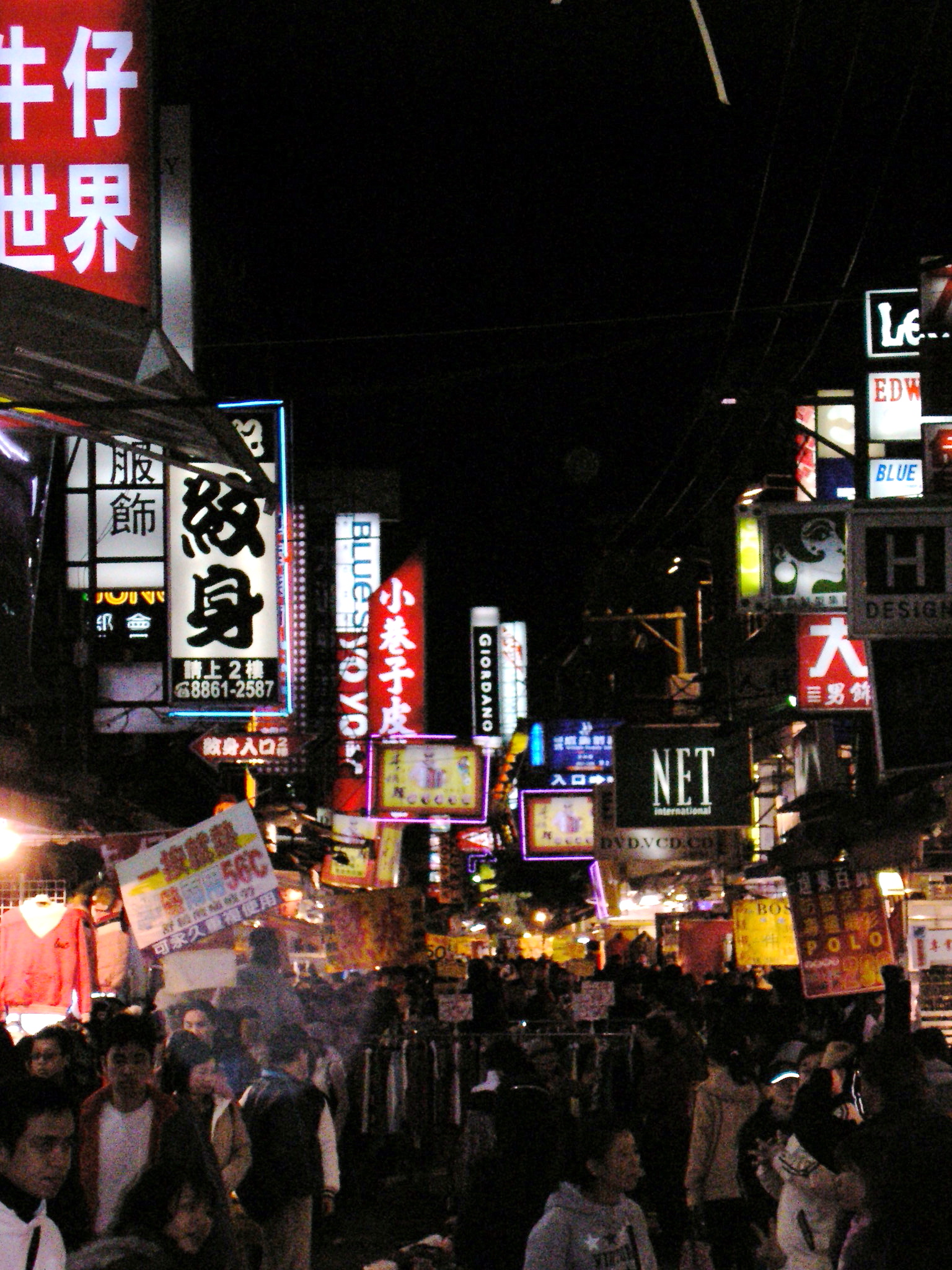
Shilin Night Market, Shilin, Taipei, Taiwan.

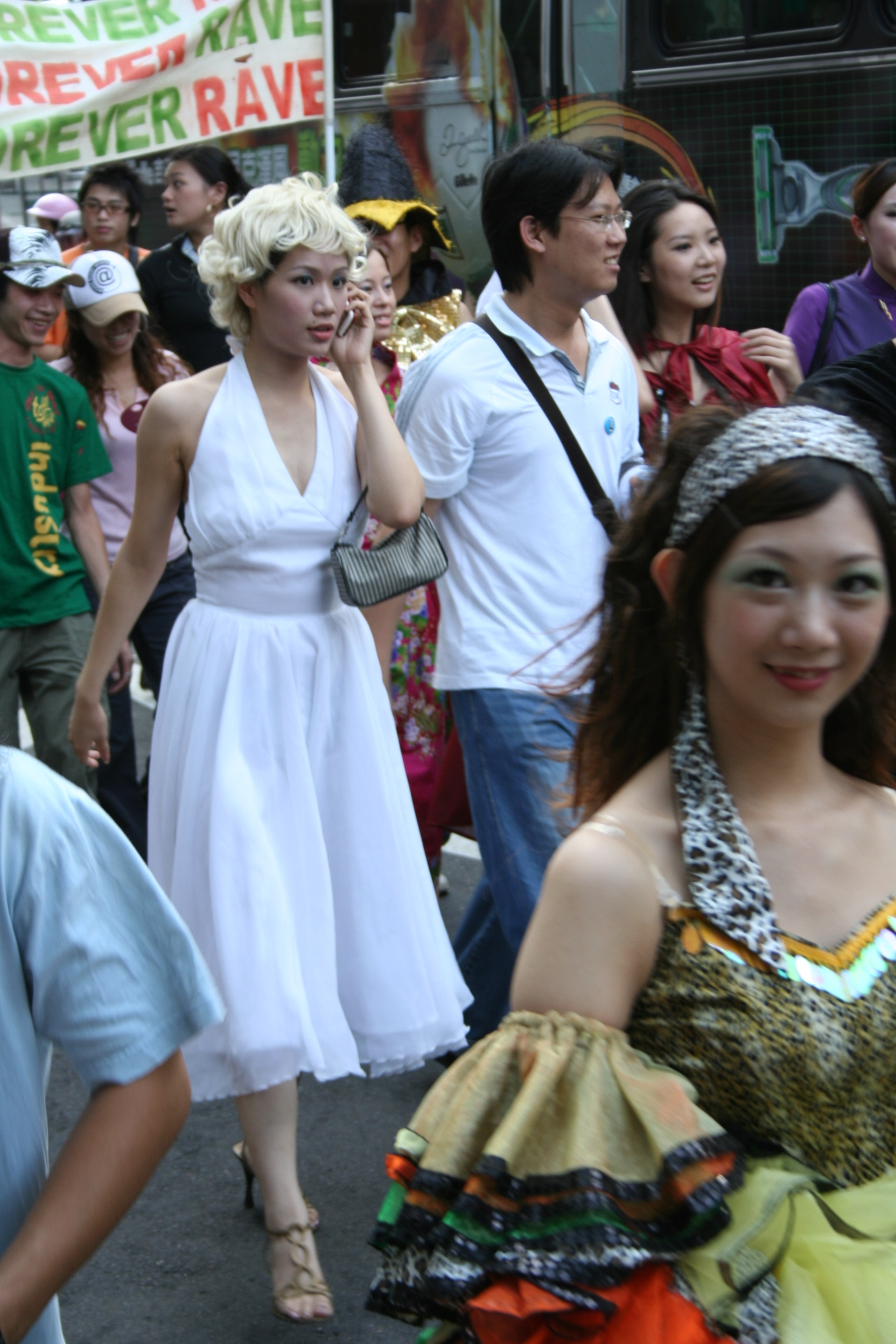
Taiwan Pride 2005, a gay pride parade on Zhongxiao East Road in Taipei.

- Architecture of Taiwan
  - Taipei 101
  - Sun Yat-sen Memorial Hall
  - Chung-Shan Building
- Festivals in Taiwan
- Public holidays in Taiwan
- Languages of Taiwan
  - Taiwanese Mandarin
  - Taiwanese Hokkien
  - Taiwanese Hakka
  - Formosan languages
- National symbols of the Republic of China
  - Coat of arms of the Republic of China
  - Flag of the Republic of China
  - National anthem of the Republic of China
- Night markets in Taiwan
- People of Taiwan
  - Han Taiwanese
  - Ethnic minorities in Taiwan
    - Taiwanese aborigines
  - Taiwanese American
  - Notable Taiwanese individuals
    - Alec Su
    - Jay Chou
    - Jolin Tsai
    - Show Lo
    - S.H.E
    - Wang Hsing-ching
    - A-mei
    - Teresa Teng
    - Takeshi Kaneshiro
  - Mainland Chinese
- Prostitution in Taiwan
- Scenic areas in Taiwan
  - Jiufen
  - Cihu Mausoleum
  - Wuzhi Mountain Military Cemetery
  - Yangmingshan
- Chinese cuisine
  - Taiwanese cuisine
    - Bubble Tea
    - Suncake
    - Taiwan Beer
- Taiwanese identity
- Tea culture of Taiwan

=== Arts in Taiwan ===
- Art in Taiwan
- Cinema of Taiwan
  - Crystal Boys
  - Cape No. 7
  - Seediq Bale
- Dance in Taiwan
  - Cloud Gate Dance Theater
- Literature of Taiwan
  - Taiwanese literature movement
  - Formosa Magazine
- Music of Taiwan
  - Chiang Kai-shek Memorial Song
  - Opera of Taiwan
- Photography in Taiwan
- Television in Taiwan
  - Taiwanese drama

=== Mass media of Taiwan ===
- International Community Radio Taipei
- The China Post
- Taipei Times
- Taiwan News
- Public Television Service
- TVBS

=== Museums in Taiwan ===
- National Palace Museum
- Taipei Fine Arts Museum
- National Museum of History
- Museum of World Religions
- Fo Guang Shan Buddha Museum
- New Taipei City Yingge Ceramics Museum
- Tamkang University Maritime Museum
- Taiwan Nougat Museum
- Shung Ye Museum of Formosan Aborigines
- Pinglin Tea Industry Museum
- National Taiwan Museum
- Republic of China Armed Forces Museum
- Miniatures Museum of Taiwan

=== Religion in Taiwan ===
- Buddhism in Taiwan
  - Four Great Mountains (Taiwan)
    - Chung Tai Shan
    - Dharma Drum Mountain
    - Fo Guang Shan
    - Tzu Chi
- Christianity in Taiwan
  - Catholic Church in Taiwan
  - Presbyterian Church in Taiwan
- Islam in Taiwan
- Judaism in Taiwan
- Taiwanese folk beliefs
  - Baishatun Mazu Pilgrimage
  - Dajia Mazu Pilgrimage
  - Qing Shan King Sacrificial Ceremony

=== Sports in Taiwan ===
- Professional baseball in Taiwan - Baseball is the most popular sport in Taiwan.
  - Chinese Professional Baseball League
- P. League+
- Super Basketball League
- Women's Super Basketball League

== Economy and infrastructure of Taiwan ==
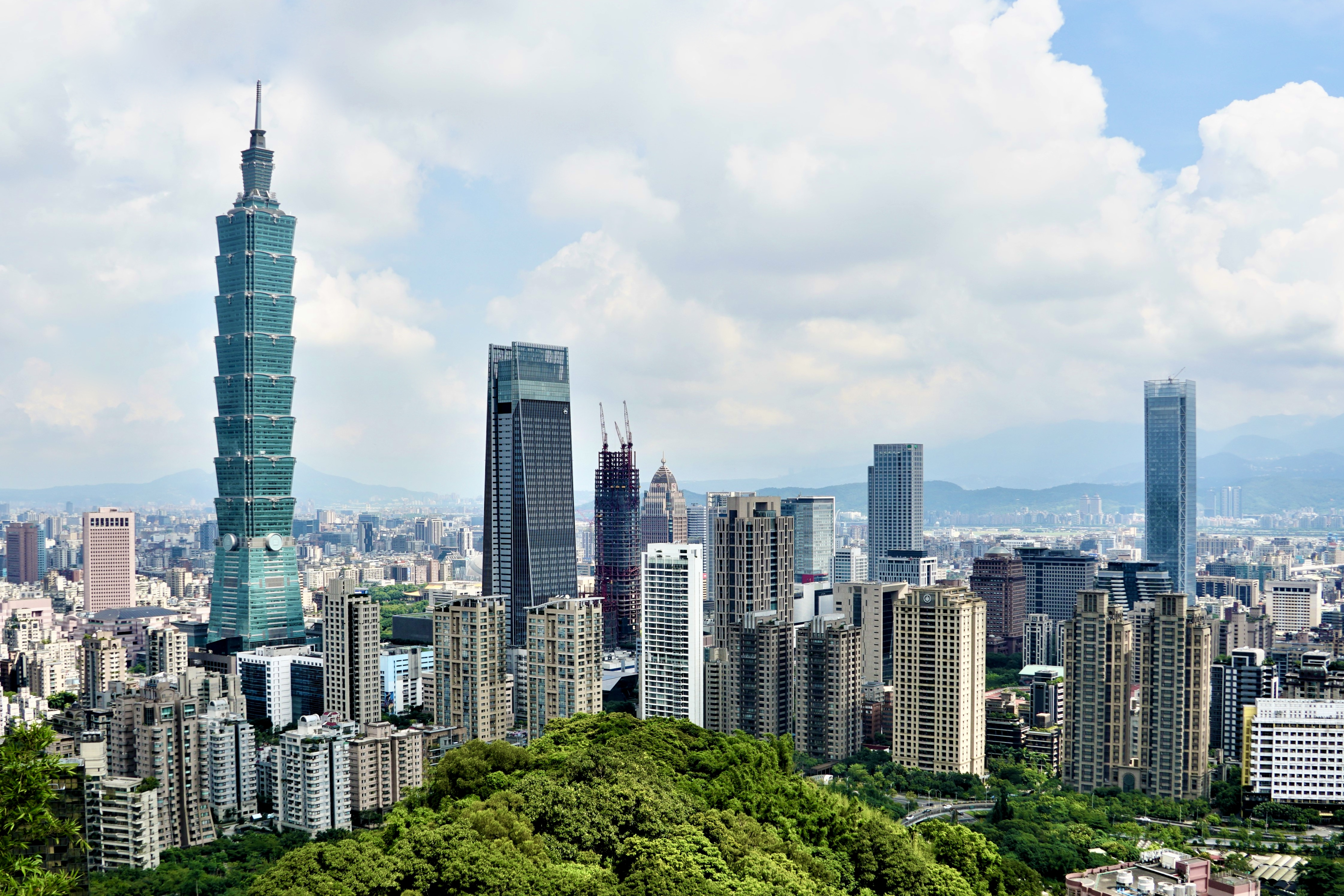
Taipei is the Republic of China's capital city and financial center. Taipei 101 was the world's tallest building from 2004 to 2010.

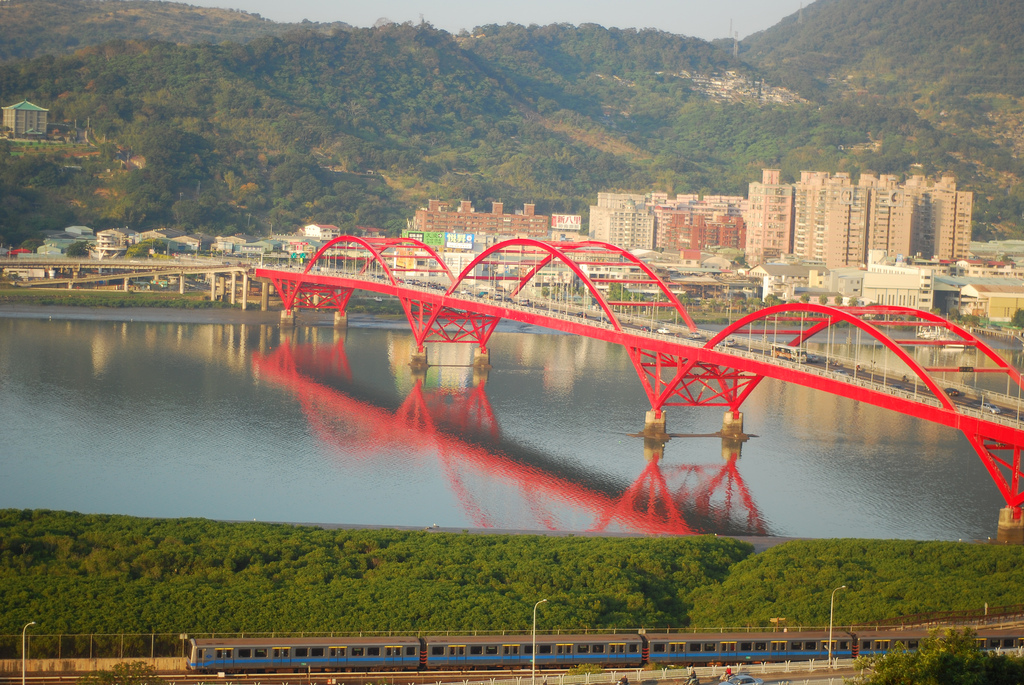
Guandu Bridge, New Taipei.

- Economic rank, by nominal GDP (2021): 21st (twenty-first)
- Agriculture in Taiwan
- Banking in Taiwan
  - Central Bank of the Republic of China (Taiwan)
- Communications in Taiwan
  - Internet in Taiwan
- Companies of Taiwan
- Currency of Taiwan: dollar
  - ISO 4217: TWD
- Economic history of Taiwan
- Energy in Taiwan
  - Energy policy of Taiwan
  - Nuclear power in Taiwan
- Four Asian Tigers
- Health care in Taiwan
- Iron rice bowl
- Taiwan Miracle
- Taiwan Stock Exchange
  - Taiwan Capitalization Weighted Stock Index
- Tourism in Taiwan
  - Tourist attractions in Taiwan
  - Shopping malls in Taiwan
  - Stadiums in Taiwan
  - Convention centers in Taiwan
- Transportation in Taiwan
  - Air transport in Taiwan
    - Airports in Taiwan
    - China Airlines
    - EVA Air
    - Starlux Airlines
  - Rail transport in Taiwan
    - Taiwan High Speed Rail
    - Taiwan Railway Administration
    - Taipei Metro, New Taipei Metro, Taichung MRT, Taoyuan Metro, Kaohsiung Metro
  - Highway system in Taiwan

== Education and research in Taiwan ==
- History of education in Taiwan
- National Taiwan University
- List of Taiwanese inventions and discoveries
- List of universities in Taiwan
- Intercollegiate Taiwanese American Students Association
- Taiwan studies

=== Research institutes ===
- Academia Sinica
- Chungshan Institute of Science and Technology
- Industrial Technology Research Institute
- National Health Research Institutes
- National Space Organization

=== Nobel laureates ===
- Yuan T. Lee

== See also ==
- Hong Kong–Taiwan relations
- List of international rankings
- Outline of Asia
- Outline of geography
