= Freedom of religion in Taiwan =

Freedom of religion in Taiwan is provided for by the Constitution of the Republic of China, which is in force on Taiwan. Taiwan's government generally respects freedom of religion in practice, with policies which contribute to the generally free practice of religion.

Taiwan's strong human rights protections, lack of state-sanctioned discrimination, and generally high regard for freedom of religion or belief earned it a joint #1 ranking alongside The Netherlands and Belgium in the 2018 Freedom of Thought Report. Freedom House also gave Taiwan the top score for religious freedoms in 2018. Possibly the only coercion to practice a certain faith in Taiwan comes from within the family, where the choice to adopt a non-traditional faith can sometimes lead to ostracism "because they stop performing ancestor worship rites and rituals."

== Religious demography ==
Taiwan has an area of 13,800 square miles (36,000 km^{2}) and a population of 23 million. The 2006 Government Information Office Yearbook, the Religious Affairs Section of the Ministry of the Interior (MOI) states that 35 percent of the population consider themselves Buddhist and 33 percent Taoist. While the overwhelming majority of religious adherents are either Buddhist or Taoist, many people also consider themselves both Buddhist and Taoist.

In addition to practicing organized religion, many persons also followed a collection of beliefs deeply ingrained in Chinese culture that can be termed "traditional Chinese folk religion." These beliefs may include some aspects of shamanism, ancestor worship, belief in ghosts and other spirits, and animism. Researchers and academics estimate that as much as 80 percent of the population believes in some form of traditional folk religion. Such folk religions may overlap with an individual's belief in Buddhism, Taoism, Confucianism, or other traditional Chinese religions.

Traditional Chinese religions with adherents constituting less than 5 percent of the population include: I Kuan Tao, Tien Ti Chiao (Heaven Emperor Religion), Tien Te Chiao (Heaven Virtue Religion), Li-ism, Hsuan Yuan Chiao (Yellow Emperor Religion), Tian Li Chiao (Tenrikyo), Universe Maitreya Emperor Religion, Hai Tze Tao, Confucianism, Zhonghua Sheng Chiao (Chinese Holy Religion), Da Yi Chiao (Great Changes Religion), Pre-cosmic Salvationism, and Huang Chung Chiao (Yellow Middle Religion).

There also may be an overlap between practitioners of Buddhism, Taoism, and other traditional Chinese religions with those of Falun Gong, which is registered as a civic, rather than religious, organization. In Taiwan, Falun Gong is generally considered a spiritual movement and not a religion. The leading proponent of Falun Gong in Taiwan reports that membership exceeds 500,000 and continues to grow rapidly.

In addition to traditional Chinese religions, small percentages of the population consider themselves Protestant, Roman Catholic, or Sunni Muslim. Several foreign missionary religious groups are also present. The Church of Scientology, the Baháʼí, the Jehovah's Witnesses, the Mahikari Religion, The Church of Jesus Christ of Latter-day Saints (Mormons) and the Unification Church are registered. Other Christian denominations present include Presbyterians, the True Jesus Church, Baptists, Lutherans, Seventh-day Adventists, and Episcopalians. Approximately 70 percent of the indigenous population of 475,000 Aborigines is Christian. There are also a small number of adherents of Judaism in Taiwan, mainly expatriates.

While the Taiwanese authorities do not collect or independently verify statistics on religious affiliation, they maintain registration statistics voluntarily reported by religious organizations. Officials from the MOI Religious Affairs Section believe these voluntarily reported statistics significantly understate the number of people in Taiwan who adhere to religious beliefs and participate in some form of religious activities. The MOI Religious Affairs Section estimates that approximately 50 percent of the population regularly participates in some form of organized religious practice, as distinguished from "traditional Chinese folk religions," and an estimated 14 percent of the population is atheist.

Religious beliefs cross political and geographical lines. Members of the political leadership practice various faiths.

=== Legal and policy framework ===
Taiwan's constitution provides for freedom of religion, and the authorities generally respect this right in practice. Authorities at all levels protect this right in full, and do not tolerate its abuse, either by official or private actors. There is no state religion.

Although registration is not mandatory, 26 religious organizations have registered with the MOI's Religious Affairs Section. Religious organizations may register with the central authorities through their island-wide associations under the Temple Management Law, the Civic Organizations Law, or the chapter of the Civil Code that governs foundations and associations. While individual places of worship may register with local authorities, many choose not to do so and operate as the personal property of their leaders. Registered religious organizations operate on a tax-free basis and are required to submit annual reports of their financial operations. The only ramification for nonregistration is the forfeiture of the tax advantages that are available for registered religious organizations. There were no reports that the authorities have sought to deny registration to new religions.

Religious organizations are permitted to operate schools, but compulsory religious instruction is not permitted in any public or private elementary, middle, or high school accredited by the Ministry of Education (MOE). High schools accredited by the MOE, while not allowed to require religious instruction, may provide elective courses in religious studies, provided such courses do not promote certain religious beliefs over others. Universities and research institutions may have religious studies departments. Before 2004, legislation barred religious schools and theological institutes from applying for MOE accreditation, and the MOE did not recognize university-level degrees granted by these types of schools. In March 2004, the Legislative Yuan revised the Private Schools Act authorized the MOE to establish an accreditation process for university-level religious education institutions supported by religious organizations or private funds. In April 2006, the MOE promulgated regulations governing the accreditation process. In August 2006, the MOE accredited its first seminary, the Dharma Drum Buddhist College.

=== Religious freedom ===
Taiwan's policies and practices contribute to the generally free practice of religion.

A significant percentage of the population of Taiwan is nonreligious. Freedom of religion in Taiwan is strong. Taiwan's strong human rights protections, lack of state-sanctioned discrimination, and generally high regard for freedom of religion or belief earned it a joint #1 ranking alongside The Netherlands and Belgium in the 2018 Freedom of Thought Report.

Taiwan is clearly an outlier in the top 3, all-clear countries. It is non-European, and demographically much more religious. But in its relatively open, democratic and tolerant society we have recorded no evidence of laws or social discrimination against members of the non-religious minority.

In 2022, the country was scored 4 out of 4 for religious freedom.

=== Improvements and positive developments in respect for religious freedom ===
The MOI promotes interfaith understanding among religious groups by sponsoring symposiums or helping to defray the expenses of privately sponsored symposiums on religious issues. The MOI also publishes and updates an introduction to major religious beliefs and groups based on material provided by the groups. This introduction is also available on the internet. In May 2006, the MOI invited some 100 leaders from religious organizations to participate in a two-day tour of outstanding social services organizations operated by religious charities, to foster cooperation among organizations with similar social welfare goals. The MOI holds an annual ceremony to honor religious groups for their contributions to public service, social welfare, and social harmony. Some 170 different organizations and individuals are recognized.

On 23 January 2007, President Chen personally congratulated local Muslims who had completed a pilgrimage to Mecca, and praised Taiwan's Muslim Association (Chinese Muslim Association, an organization that is fully independent from the government) for promoting frequent exchanges between Taiwan and the Islamic world. President Chen also credited practicing Muslims on Taiwan for helping to create a richer, more diverse culture on the island.

== Societal abuses and discrimination ==
There have been no reports of societal abuses or discrimination based on religious belief or practice. Prominent societal leaders have taken positive steps to promote religious tolerance. For instance, the Taiwan Council for Religion and Peace, the China Religious Believers Association, and the Taiwan Religious Association are private organizations that promote greater understanding and tolerance among adherents of different religions. These associations and various religious groups occasionally sponsor symposiums to promote mutual understanding. The Taiwan Conference on Religion and Peace sponsors summer seminars every year to help college students understand the practice of major religions in Taiwan.

== See also ==
- Religion in Taiwan
- Human rights in Taiwan
- Secularism in Taiwan
