= Secularism in Taiwan =

Taiwan is a secular state. Article 13 of the Taiwanese Constitution says, “people have freedom of religious beliefs”. According to a 2018 report, Taiwan is among the best three states in terms of tolerance towards atheism. According to US State Department report of 2022, there were no reports during the year of significant societal actions affecting religious freedom.

== See also ==
- Freedom of religion in Taiwan
