= Climate of Taiwan =

Köppen climate classification of Taiwan

The island of Taiwan lies across the Tropic of Cancer, and its climate is influenced by the East Asian Monsoon. Northern Taiwan has a humid subtropical climate, with substantial seasonal variation of temperatures, while parts of central and most of southern Taiwan have a tropical monsoon climate where seasonal temperature variations are less noticeable, with temperatures typically varying from warm to hot. During the winter (November to March), the northeast experiences steady rain, while the central and southern parts of the island are mostly sunny. The summer monsoon (from May to October) accounts for 90% of the annual precipitation in the south, but only 60% in the north. The average rainfall is approximately 2,600 mm per year.

== Local climates ==
Humid subtropical climate

Climate data for Taipei (normals 1991–2020, extremes 1896–present)
| Month | Jan | Feb | Mar | Apr | May | Jun | Jul | Aug | Sep | Oct | Nov | Dec | Year |
|---|---|---|---|---|---|---|---|---|---|---|---|---|---|
| Record high °C (°F) | 31.9 (89.4) | 31.8 (89.2) | 35.0 (95.0) | 36.2 (97.2) | 38.2 (100.8) | 38.9 (102.0) | 39.7 (103.5) | 39.3 (102.7) | 38.6 (101.5) | 36.8 (98.2) | 34.3 (93.7) | 31.5 (88.7) | 39.7 (103.5) |
| Mean daily maximum °C (°F) | 19.6 (67.3) | 20.7 (69.3) | 22.9 (73.2) | 26.7 (80.1) | 30.1 (86.2) | 32.9 (91.2) | 35.0 (95.0) | 34.4 (93.9) | 31.6 (88.9) | 27.8 (82.0) | 24.9 (76.8) | 21.1 (70.0) | 27.3 (81.1) |
| Daily mean °C (°F) | 15.9 (60.6) | 17.2 (63.0) | 18.6 (65.5) | 22.5 (72.5) | 25.8 (78.4) | 28.3 (82.9) | 30.1 (86.2) | 29.0 (84.2) | 27.8 (82.0) | 24.7 (76.5) | 22.0 (71.6) | 18.8 (65.8) | 23.4 (74.1) |
| Mean daily minimum °C (°F) | 13.0 (55.4) | 14.7 (58.5) | 16.2 (61.2) | 19.4 (66.9) | 22.8 (73.0) | 25.3 (77.5) | 26.8 (80.2) | 26.6 (79.9) | 25.2 (77.4) | 22.6 (72.7) | 19.8 (67.6) | 16.1 (61.0) | 20.8 (69.4) |
| Record low °C (°F) | −0.1 (31.8) | −0.2 (31.6) | 1.4 (34.5) | 4.7 (40.5) | 10.0 (50.0) | 15.6 (60.1) | 19.5 (67.1) | 18.9 (66.0) | 13.5 (56.3) | 10.2 (50.4) | 1.1 (34.0) | 1.8 (35.2) | −0.2 (31.6) |
| Average precipitation mm (inches) | 93.8 (3.69) | 102.4 (4.03) | 107.8 (4.24) | 101.4 (3.99) | 225.2 (8.87) | 234.6 (9.24) | 214.2 (8.43) | 236.5 (9.31) | 236.8 (9.32) | 162.6 (6.40) | 89.3 (3.52) | 96.9 (3.81) | 1,901.5 (74.85) |
| Average precipitation days (≥ 0.1 mm) | 13.6 | 12.0 | 14.1 | 14.5 | 14.5 | 15.7 | 11.8 | 14.6 | 13.8 | 12.8 | 12.5 | 13.1 | 163 |
| Average relative humidity (%) | 77.2 | 77.8 | 76.1 | 74.9 | 74.7 | 75.3 | 70.2 | 72.1 | 73.9 | 74.4 | 75.0 | 75.9 | 74.8 |
| Mean monthly sunshine hours | 76.1 | 79.3 | 95.1 | 96.9 | 113.6 | 114.8 | 176.9 | 182.8 | 151.7 | 114.7 | 93.3 | 78.6 | 1,373.8 |
| Percentage possible sunshine | 23 | 25 | 26 | 25 | 27 | 28 | 42 | 45 | 41 | 32 | 29 | 24 | 31 |
Source: Central Weather Bureau

Climate data for Taichung (1991–2020 normals, extremes 1897–present）
| Month | Jan | Feb | Mar | Apr | May | Jun | Jul | Aug | Sep | Oct | Nov | Dec | Year |
|---|---|---|---|---|---|---|---|---|---|---|---|---|---|
| Record high °C (°F) | 31.3 (88.3) | 33.2 (91.8) | 34.7 (94.5) | 34.7 (94.5) | 37.0 (98.6) | 36.8 (98.2) | 39.9 (103.8) | 39.3 (102.7) | 39.0 (102.2) | 38.3 (100.9) | 34.0 (93.2) | 31.7 (89.1) | 39.9 (103.8) |
| Mean daily maximum °C (°F) | 22.3 (72.1) | 22.9 (73.2) | 25.2 (77.4) | 28.1 (82.6) | 30.7 (87.3) | 32.3 (90.1) | 33.3 (91.9) | 32.7 (90.9) | 32.2 (90.0) | 30.3 (86.5) | 27.6 (81.7) | 23.9 (75.0) | 28.5 (83.2) |
| Daily mean °C (°F) | 17.0 (62.6) | 17.7 (63.9) | 20.1 (68.2) | 23.5 (74.3) | 26.4 (79.5) | 28.1 (82.6) | 28.9 (84.0) | 28.4 (83.1) | 27.8 (82.0) | 25.5 (77.9) | 22.6 (72.7) | 18.7 (65.7) | 23.7 (74.7) |
| Mean daily minimum °C (°F) | 13.4 (56.1) | 14.2 (57.6) | 16.4 (61.5) | 20.1 (68.2) | 23.1 (73.6) | 24.9 (76.8) | 25.5 (77.9) | 25.3 (77.5) | 24.6 (76.3) | 22.2 (72.0) | 19.0 (66.2) | 15.1 (59.2) | 20.3 (68.5) |
| Record low °C (°F) | −0.7 (30.7) | −1.0 (30.2) | 2.1 (35.8) | 8.6 (47.5) | 10.8 (51.4) | 15.5 (59.9) | 20.5 (68.9) | 20.0 (68.0) | 14.4 (57.9) | 10.5 (50.9) | 1.4 (34.5) | 1.8 (35.2) | −1.0 (30.2) |
| Average precipitation mm (inches) | 36.6 (1.44) | 63.0 (2.48) | 86.9 (3.42) | 126.8 (4.99) | 249.6 (9.83) | 329.0 (12.95) | 303.3 (11.94) | 340.8 (13.42) | 147.5 (5.81) | 25.0 (0.98) | 23.8 (0.94) | 30.5 (1.20) | 1,762.8 (69.4) |
| Average precipitation days (≥ 0.1 mm) | 6.6 | 8.0 | 10.1 | 10.8 | 12.3 | 14.1 | 13.5 | 15.8 | 8.5 | 3.0 | 4.1 | 5.3 | 112.1 |
| Average relative humidity (%) | 74.4 | 75.2 | 74.6 | 75.1 | 75.7 | 76.2 | 74.9 | 77.4 | 74.3 | 70.8 | 72.4 | 72.6 | 74.5 |
| Mean monthly sunshine hours | 174.0 | 148.3 | 152.7 | 138.2 | 154.6 | 160.9 | 192.7 | 161.5 | 173.1 | 205.9 | 174.4 | 174.2 | 2,010.5 |
Source: Central Weather Bureau

Tropical savanna climate

Climate data for Kaohsiung City (1991–2020 normals, extremes 1931–present）
| Month | Jan | Feb | Mar | Apr | May | Jun | Jul | Aug | Sep | Oct | Nov | Dec | Year |
|---|---|---|---|---|---|---|---|---|---|---|---|---|---|
| Record high °C (°F) | 31.6 (88.9) | 32.5 (90.5) | 33.2 (91.8) | 35.4 (95.7) | 36.4 (97.5) | 37.2 (99.0) | 37.1 (98.8) | 36.1 (97.0) | 37.6 (99.7) | 34.8 (94.6) | 33.0 (91.4) | 34.4 (93.9) | 37.6 (99.7) |
| Mean daily maximum °C (°F) | 24.2 (75.6) | 25.0 (77.0) | 27.0 (80.6) | 29.3 (84.7) | 31.0 (87.8) | 32.1 (89.8) | 32.7 (90.9) | 32.1 (89.8) | 31.8 (89.2) | 30.1 (86.2) | 28.1 (82.6) | 25.3 (77.5) | 29.1 (84.3) |
| Daily mean °C (°F) | 19.7 (67.5) | 20.7 (69.3) | 23.0 (73.4) | 25.7 (78.3) | 27.8 (82.0) | 28.9 (84.0) | 29.4 (84.9) | 28.9 (84.0) | 28.5 (83.3) | 26.9 (80.4) | 24.5 (76.1) | 21.2 (70.2) | 25.4 (77.8) |
| Mean daily minimum °C (°F) | 16.2 (61.2) | 17.2 (63.0) | 19.7 (67.5) | 22.8 (73.0) | 25.2 (77.4) | 26.3 (79.3) | 26.7 (80.1) | 26.3 (79.3) | 25.9 (78.6) | 24.4 (75.9) | 21.6 (70.9) | 17.9 (64.2) | 22.5 (72.5) |
| Record low °C (°F) | 5.7 (42.3) | 6.6 (43.9) | 6.8 (44.2) | 10.3 (50.5) | 17.3 (63.1) | 19.0 (66.2) | 20.0 (68.0) | 20.7 (69.3) | 19.5 (67.1) | 14.7 (58.5) | 10.2 (50.4) | 4.4 (39.9) | 4.4 (39.9) |
| Average precipitation mm (inches) | 19.1 (0.75) | 17.7 (0.70) | 32.3 (1.27) | 68.4 (2.69) | 202.2 (7.96) | 416.2 (16.39) | 377.2 (14.85) | 512.4 (20.17) | 224.5 (8.84) | 53.4 (2.10) | 25.6 (1.01) | 19.2 (0.76) | 1,968.2 (77.49) |
| Average precipitation days (≥ 0.1 mm) | 3.2 | 3.2 | 3.6 | 5.4 | 6.2 | 12.9 | 13.2 | 16.7 | 10.1 | 4.2 | 2.8 | 2.8 | 84.3 |
| Average relative humidity (%) | 71.6 | 71.8 | 71.9 | 74.2 | 76.6 | 79.0 | 78.0 | 79.9 | 77.5 | 74.2 | 73.1 | 71.6 | 75.0 |
| Mean monthly sunshine hours | 177.0 | 176.0 | 194.7 | 197.2 | 207.7 | 215.0 | 220.7 | 189.3 | 188.6 | 191.9 | 166.5 | 157.2 | 2,281.8 |
Source: Central Weather Bureau

Tropical monsoon climate

Climate data for Taitung City (1991–2020 normals, extremes 1901–present）
| Month | Jan | Feb | Mar | Apr | May | Jun | Jul | Aug | Sep | Oct | Nov | Dec | Year |
|---|---|---|---|---|---|---|---|---|---|---|---|---|---|
| Record high °C (°F) | 32.7 (90.9) | 34.0 (93.2) | 37.4 (99.3) | 38.2 (100.8) | 40.2 (104.4) | 39.5 (103.1) | 39.0 (102.2) | 39.3 (102.7) | 37.8 (100.0) | 38.5 (101.3) | 33.3 (91.9) | 30.8 (87.4) | 40.2 (104.4) |
| Mean daily maximum °C (°F) | 23.2 (73.8) | 23.8 (74.8) | 25.4 (77.7) | 27.8 (82.0) | 30.0 (86.0) | 31.8 (89.2) | 32.6 (90.7) | 32.2 (90.0) | 31.3 (88.3) | 29.4 (84.9) | 27.1 (80.8) | 24.3 (75.7) | 28.2 (82.8) |
| Daily mean °C (°F) | 19.7 (67.5) | 20.2 (68.4) | 21.8 (71.2) | 24.1 (75.4) | 26.4 (79.5) | 28.3 (82.9) | 29.1 (84.4) | 28.8 (83.8) | 27.7 (81.9) | 25.8 (78.4) | 23.6 (74.5) | 20.8 (69.4) | 24.7 (76.4) |
| Mean daily minimum °C (°F) | 17.1 (62.8) | 17.5 (63.5) | 19.0 (66.2) | 21.3 (70.3) | 23.7 (74.7) | 25.5 (77.9) | 26.2 (79.2) | 26.1 (79.0) | 25.0 (77.0) | 23.2 (73.8) | 21.1 (70.0) | 18.3 (64.9) | 22.0 (71.6) |
| Record low °C (°F) | 7.2 (45.0) | 7.5 (45.5) | 9.7 (49.5) | 11.6 (52.9) | 15.9 (60.6) | 17.1 (62.8) | 20.5 (68.9) | 20.9 (69.6) | 18.3 (64.9) | 15.2 (59.4) | 9.3 (48.7) | 8.9 (48.0) | 7.2 (45.0) |
| Average precipitation mm (inches) | 33.1 (1.30) | 40.7 (1.60) | 36.5 (1.44) | 64.8 (2.55) | 138.3 (5.44) | 201.9 (7.95) | 250.2 (9.85) | 316.4 (12.46) | 295.6 (11.64) | 215.0 (8.46) | 99.3 (3.91) | 45.8 (1.80) | 1,737.6 (68.4) |
| Average precipitation days (≥ 0.1 mm) | 8.4 | 9.1 | 9.3 | 10.9 | 14.4 | 11.5 | 10.1 | 11.7 | 12.8 | 9.9 | 8.6 | 8.4 | 125.1 |
| Average relative humidity (%) | 71.5 | 72.9 | 73.3 | 75.2 | 77.3 | 77.3 | 76.0 | 76.6 | 76.3 | 72.6 | 72.1 | 70.7 | 74.3 |
| Mean monthly sunshine hours | 93.7 | 85.1 | 102.1 | 116.8 | 148.0 | 210.2 | 253.2 | 223.5 | 173.1 | 157.3 | 122.2 | 98.6 | 1,783.8 |
Source: Central Weather Bureau

Orchid İsland Tropical rainforest climate

Climate data for Lanyu Weather Station – 324 m above sea level (1991–2020 normals, extremes 1942–present）
| Month | Jan | Feb | Mar | Apr | May | Jun | Jul | Aug | Sep | Oct | Nov | Dec | Year |
|---|---|---|---|---|---|---|---|---|---|---|---|---|---|
| Record high °C (°F) | 27.3 (81.1) | 29.3 (84.7) | 29.8 (85.6) | 32.1 (89.8) | 32.1 (89.8) | 33.1 (91.6) | 33.1 (91.6) | 35.2 (95.4) | 32.2 (90.0) | 31.1 (88.0) | 29.8 (85.6) | 28.5 (83.3) | 35.2 (95.4) |
| Mean daily maximum °C (°F) | 20.8 (69.4) | 21.4 (70.5) | 22.9 (73.2) | 24.8 (76.6) | 26.7 (80.1) | 28.0 (82.4) | 28.6 (83.5) | 28.5 (83.3) | 27.7 (81.9) | 25.9 (78.6) | 23.9 (75.0) | 21.5 (70.7) | 25.1 (77.1) |
| Daily mean °C (°F) | 18.6 (65.5) | 19.0 (66.2) | 20.4 (68.7) | 22.3 (72.1) | 24.3 (75.7) | 25.9 (78.6) | 26.2 (79.2) | 26.0 (78.8) | 25.3 (77.5) | 23.7 (74.7) | 21.9 (71.4) | 19.5 (67.1) | 22.8 (73.0) |
| Mean daily minimum °C (°F) | 17.0 (62.6) | 17.4 (63.3) | 18.7 (65.7) | 20.7 (69.3) | 22.7 (72.9) | 24.3 (75.7) | 24.6 (76.3) | 24.3 (75.7) | 23.6 (74.5) | 22.3 (72.1) | 20.5 (68.9) | 18.1 (64.6) | 21.2 (70.1) |
| Record low °C (°F) | 9.2 (48.6) | 9.5 (49.1) | 10.3 (50.5) | 11.3 (52.3) | 16.1 (61.0) | 17.6 (63.7) | 20.2 (68.4) | 19.3 (66.7) | 13.3 (55.9) | 14.1 (57.4) | 10.8 (51.4) | 9.2 (48.6) | 9.2 (48.6) |
| Average precipitation mm (inches) | 249.9 (9.84) | 190.7 (7.51) | 135.2 (5.32) | 142.9 (5.63) | 247.2 (9.73) | 245.8 (9.68) | 252.0 (9.92) | 328.8 (12.94) | 361.1 (14.22) | 299.0 (11.77) | 282.6 (11.13) | 243.5 (9.59) | 2,978.7 (117.28) |
| Average precipitation days (≥ 0.1 mm) | 22.0 | 18.4 | 16.1 | 14.3 | 15.1 | 13.7 | 14.9 | 16.9 | 18.4 | 18.2 | 19.9 | 21.7 | 209.6 |
| Average relative humidity (%) | 85.6 | 86.6 | 86.4 | 88.2 | 89.0 | 90.2 | 89.4 | 89.5 | 86.6 | 85.8 | 86.4 | 85.3 | 87.4 |
| Mean monthly sunshine hours | 73.3 | 73.5 | 96.9 | 109.7 | 127.7 | 142.4 | 179.1 | 158.2 | 136.7 | 125.7 | 81.6 | 64.3 | 1,369.1 |
Source: Central Weather Bureau

Tropical rainforest climate

Climate data for Lanyu Weather Station – Ground level
| Month | Jan | Feb | Mar | Apr | May | Jun | Jul | Aug | Sep | Oct | Nov | Dec | Year |
|---|---|---|---|---|---|---|---|---|---|---|---|---|---|
| Mean daily maximum °C (°F) | 24.1 (75.4) | 24.6 (76.3) | 26.3 (79.3) | 28.1 (82.6) | 30.2 (86.4) | 31.0 (87.8) | 32.2 (90.0) | 32.3 (90.1) | 31.7 (89.1) | 29.8 (85.6) | 27.4 (81.3) | 24.8 (76.6) | 28.5 (83.4) |
| Daily mean °C (°F) | 21.8 (71.2) | 22.5 (72.5) | 24.0 (75.2) | 25.8 (78.4) | 27.9 (82.2) | 29.2 (84.6) | 29.5 (85.1) | 29.3 (84.7) | 28.6 (83.5) | 27.3 (81.1) | 25.1 (77.2) | 22.8 (73.0) | 26.2 (79.1) |
| Mean daily minimum °C (°F) | 20.2 (68.4) | 20.6 (69.1) | 22.2 (72.0) | 24.1 (75.4) | 25.3 (77.5) | 27.4 (81.3) | 27.9 (82.2) | 27.6 (81.7) | 26.8 (80.2) | 25.5 (77.9) | 23.5 (74.3) | 21.3 (70.3) | 24.4 (75.9) |
Source: Lanyu Weather Accuweather

Alpine climate

Yu Shan is colder climate in Taiwan

Climate data for Yushan (1991–2020 normals, extremes 1943–present）
| Month | Jan | Feb | Mar | Apr | May | Jun | Jul | Aug | Sep | Oct | Nov | Dec | Year |
|---|---|---|---|---|---|---|---|---|---|---|---|---|---|
| Record high °C (°F) | 18.9 (66.0) | 23.4 (74.1) | 20.9 (69.6) | 23.2 (73.8) | 24.8 (76.6) | 26.2 (79.2) | 25.9 (78.6) | 22.6 (72.7) | 23.6 (74.5) | 24.2 (75.6) | 20.2 (68.4) | 16.8 (62.2) | 26.2 (79.2) |
| Mean daily maximum °C (°F) | 4.6 (40.3) | 4.5 (40.1) | 6.4 (43.5) | 8.7 (47.7) | 11.2 (52.2) | 12.9 (55.2) | 14.4 (57.9) | 14.0 (57.2) | 14.0 (57.2) | 13.9 (57.0) | 10.6 (51.1) | 6.7 (44.1) | 10.2 (50.4) |
| Daily mean °C (°F) | −0.5 (31.1) | −0.2 (31.6) | 1.4 (34.5) | 3.6 (38.5) | 6.0 (42.8) | 7.4 (45.3) | 8.0 (46.4) | 7.8 (46.0) | 7.4 (45.3) | 6.6 (43.9) | 4.1 (39.4) | 1.2 (34.2) | 4.4 (39.9) |
| Mean daily minimum °C (°F) | −4.0 (24.8) | −3.4 (25.9) | −1.7 (28.9) | 0.6 (33.1) | 3.0 (37.4) | 4.5 (40.1) | 4.6 (40.3) | 4.6 (40.3) | 4.1 (39.4) | 2.8 (37.0) | 0.7 (33.3) | −2.1 (28.2) | 1.1 (34.0) |
| Record low °C (°F) | −18.4 (−1.1) | −14.8 (5.4) | −15.2 (4.6) | −10.1 (13.8) | −3.9 (25.0) | −1.9 (28.6) | −3.2 (26.2) | −0.4 (31.3) | −2.4 (27.7) | −6.1 (21.0) | −10.6 (12.9) | −15.0 (5.0) | −18.4 (−1.1) |
| Average precipitation mm (inches) | 83.7 (3.30) | 67.2 (2.65) | 94.8 (3.73) | 201.2 (7.92) | 423.6 (16.68) | 459.6 (18.09) | 434.2 (17.09) | 516.0 (20.31) | 297.2 (11.70) | 145.1 (5.71) | 98.3 (3.87) | 81.6 (3.21) | 2,902.5 (114.27) |
| Average precipitation days (≥ 0.1 mm) | 6.8 | 6.9 | 7.8 | 13.1 | 18.7 | 18.0 | 18.1 | 18.4 | 14.4 | 10.1 | 8.2 | 6.5 | 147.0 |
| Average relative humidity (%) | 62.3 | 70.7 | 76.2 | 80.0 | 81.5 | 80.8 | 77.7 | 81.0 | 77.4 | 66.4 | 65.9 | 63.1 | 73.6 |
| Mean monthly sunshine hours | 207.0 | 158.7 | 151.0 | 139.4 | 133.8 | 135.9 | 171.3 | 150.8 | 158.5 | 213.6 | 199.7 | 197.1 | 2,016.8 |
| Percentage possible sunshine | 62 | 51 | 41 | 37 | 33 | 34 | 42 | 38 | 44 | 60 | 61 | 60 | 46 |
Source: Central Weather Bureau

Oceanic climate

Climate data for Alishan, elevation 2,413 m (7,917 ft), (1991–2020 normals, extremes 1933–present）
| Month | Jan | Feb | Mar | Apr | May | Jun | Jul | Aug | Sep | Oct | Nov | Dec | Year |
|---|---|---|---|---|---|---|---|---|---|---|---|---|---|
| Record high °C (°F) | 20.4 (68.7) | 21.3 (70.3) | 21.7 (71.1) | 23.6 (74.5) | 23.0 (73.4) | 25.5 (77.9) | 24.9 (76.8) | 24.3 (75.7) | 25.2 (77.4) | 23.6 (74.5) | 23.2 (73.8) | 20.8 (69.4) | 25.5 (77.9) |
| Mean daily maximum °C (°F) | 11.0 (51.8) | 11.7 (53.1) | 13.9 (57.0) | 15.7 (60.3) | 17.2 (63.0) | 18.4 (65.1) | 19.3 (66.7) | 18.8 (65.8) | 18.5 (65.3) | 17.4 (63.3) | 15.6 (60.1) | 12.6 (54.7) | 15.8 (60.5) |
| Daily mean °C (°F) | 6.5 (43.7) | 7.3 (45.1) | 9.5 (49.1) | 11.5 (52.7) | 13.1 (55.6) | 14.4 (57.9) | 14.7 (58.5) | 14.6 (58.3) | 14.0 (57.2) | 12.4 (54.3) | 10.7 (51.3) | 8.0 (46.4) | 11.4 (52.5) |
| Mean daily minimum °C (°F) | 3.1 (37.6) | 4.1 (39.4) | 6.1 (43.0) | 8.4 (47.1) | 10.2 (50.4) | 11.6 (52.9) | 11.6 (52.9) | 11.7 (53.1) | 11.0 (51.8) | 9.1 (48.4) | 7.4 (45.3) | 4.6 (40.3) | 8.2 (46.8) |
| Record low °C (°F) | −11.5 (11.3) | −8.5 (16.7) | −7.0 (19.4) | −5.5 (22.1) | 0.7 (33.3) | 0.0 (32.0) | 5.6 (42.1) | 4.0 (39.2) | −0.8 (30.6) | −5.2 (22.6) | −5.0 (23.0) | −8.0 (17.6) | −11.5 (11.3) |
| Average precipitation mm (inches) | 86.8 (3.42) | 109.9 (4.33) | 146.6 (5.77) | 223.9 (8.81) | 510.4 (20.09) | 674.7 (26.56) | 694.7 (27.35) | 813.1 (32.01) | 402.7 (15.85) | 141.2 (5.56) | 66.9 (2.63) | 69.7 (2.74) | 3,940.6 (155.12) |
| Average precipitation days (≥ 0.1 mm) | 7.9 | 8.3 | 9.8 | 12.5 | 19.3 | 19.7 | 21.0 | 22.6 | 16.8 | 9.2 | 6.6 | 7.4 | 161.1 |
| Average relative humidity (%) | 80.6 | 83.4 | 81.4 | 84.0 | 89.2 | 89.5 | 91.1 | 92.2 | 91.3 | 86.9 | 82.4 | 80.6 | 86.1 |
| Mean monthly sunshine hours | 149.2 | 120.6 | 138.0 | 120.9 | 103.2 | 108.0 | 118.1 | 102.0 | 105.2 | 135.6 | 143.3 | 148.3 | 1,492.4 |
Source: Central Weather Bureau

Dabang is located at a lower altitude than Alishan, so the climate is much milder.

Climate data for Dabang, elevation 980 m (3,220 ft), (2019–2023, extremes 2016–present)
| Month | Jan | Feb | Mar | Apr | May | Jun | Jul | Aug | Sep | Oct | Nov | Dec | Year |
|---|---|---|---|---|---|---|---|---|---|---|---|---|---|
| Record high °C (°F) | 25.3 (77.5) | 27.4 (81.3) | 30.1 (86.2) | 29.4 (84.9) | 31.4 (88.5) | 30.1 (86.2) | 30.4 (86.7) | 31.7 (89.1) | 30.0 (86.0) | 31.4 (88.5) | 28.4 (83.1) | 26.3 (79.3) | 31.7 (89.1) |
| Mean daily maximum °C (°F) | 20.2 (68.4) | 21.1 (70.0) | 22.8 (73.0) | 24.3 (75.7) | 26.0 (78.8) | 27.1 (80.8) | 27.8 (82.0) | 26.9 (80.4) | 26.8 (80.2) | 25.4 (77.7) | 23.9 (75.0) | 20.7 (69.3) | 24.4 (75.9) |
| Daily mean °C (°F) | 14.7 (58.5) | 15.9 (60.6) | 17.8 (64.0) | 19.5 (67.1) | 21.3 (70.3) | 22.1 (71.8) | 22.6 (72.7) | 22.1 (71.8) | 22.0 (71.6) | 20.9 (69.6) | 19.0 (66.2) | 15.9 (60.6) | 19.5 (67.1) |
| Mean daily minimum °C (°F) | 11.3 (52.3) | 11.9 (53.4) | 13.9 (57.0) | 15.8 (60.4) | 18.0 (64.4) | 18.7 (65.7) | 19.0 (66.2) | 19.1 (66.4) | 18.7 (65.7) | 15.6 (60.1) | 13.3 (55.9) | 12.6 (54.7) | 15.7 (60.2) |
| Record low °C (°F) | 2.7 (36.9) | 3.5 (38.3) | 5.0 (41.0) | 7.2 (45.0) | 13.9 (57.0) | 16.7 (62.1) | 16.6 (61.9) | 17.1 (62.8) | 16.2 (61.2) | 11.4 (52.5) | 9.3 (48.7) | 4.5 (40.1) | 2.7 (36.9) |
| Average precipitation mm (inches) | 61.0 (2.40) | 38.9 (1.53) | 85.2 (3.35) | 119.3 (4.70) | 350.2 (13.79) | 580.6 (22.86) | 352.4 (13.87) | 549.9 (21.65) | 272.7 (10.74) | 58.3 (2.30) | 23.3 (0.92) | 43.7 (1.72) | 2,535.5 (99.83) |
| Average precipitation days | 7.8 | 5.6 | 8.6 | 9.9 | 17.0 | 20.8 | 21.9 | 22.2 | 15.0 | 8.4 | 4.8 | 6.2 | 148.2 |
| Average relative humidity (%) | 77.1 | 76.2 | 76.6 | 77.9 | 82.0 | 84.7 | 85.7 | 87.7 | 85.1 | 83.2 | 79.9 | 79.0 | 81.3 |
Source 1: Central Weather Administration
Source 2: Atmospheric Science Research and Application Databank (precipitation and humidity 2016–2023)

Humid subtropical climate

The Matsu Islands have a humid subtropical climate and are located in a much colder climate than Taiwan, but no frost has been recorded, for example, bougainvillea grows easily here.

Climate data for Matsu Islands (Nangan) (2005–2020 normals, extremes 2004–present)
| Month | Jan | Feb | Mar | Apr | May | Jun | Jul | Aug | Sep | Oct | Nov | Dec | Year |
|---|---|---|---|---|---|---|---|---|---|---|---|---|---|
| Record high °C (°F) | 24.2 (75.6) | 25.7 (78.3) | 28.1 (82.6) | 29.4 (84.9) | 32.7 (90.9) | 34.1 (93.4) | 35.1 (95.2) | 36.3 (97.3) | 36.6 (97.9) | 32.4 (90.3) | 28.9 (84.0) | 24.1 (75.4) | 36.6 (97.9) |
| Mean daily maximum °C (°F) | 12.8 (55.0) | 13.3 (55.9) | 16.1 (61.0) | 20.6 (69.1) | 24.6 (76.3) | 27.8 (82.0) | 30.8 (87.4) | 31.4 (88.5) | 29.2 (84.6) | 25.0 (77.0) | 20.6 (69.1) | 15.5 (59.9) | 22.3 (72.2) |
| Daily mean °C (°F) | 10.6 (51.1) | 10.6 (51.1) | 12.8 (55.0) | 17.1 (62.8) | 21.5 (70.7) | 25.2 (77.4) | 27.8 (82.0) | 28.0 (82.4) | 26.4 (79.5) | 22.7 (72.9) | 18.4 (65.1) | 13.3 (55.9) | 19.5 (67.2) |
| Mean daily minimum °C (°F) | 8.8 (47.8) | 8.5 (47.3) | 10.3 (50.5) | 14.4 (57.9) | 19.1 (66.4) | 23.1 (73.6) | 25.6 (78.1) | 25.8 (78.4) | 24.4 (75.9) | 20.8 (69.4) | 16.6 (61.9) | 11.4 (52.5) | 17.4 (63.3) |
| Record low °C (°F) | 0.3 (32.5) | 2.1 (35.8) | 1.5 (34.7) | 7.3 (45.1) | 12.0 (53.6) | 16.4 (61.5) | 21.0 (69.8) | 22.0 (71.6) | 18.3 (64.9) | 13.7 (56.7) | 8.9 (48.0) | 3.2 (37.8) | 0.3 (32.5) |
| Average precipitation mm (inches) | 50.2 (1.98) | 74.5 (2.93) | 107.6 (4.24) | 117.4 (4.62) | 144.8 (5.70) | 181.9 (7.16) | 104.2 (4.10) | 117.1 (4.61) | 94.1 (3.70) | 38.2 (1.50) | 64.4 (2.54) | 46.0 (1.81) | 1,140.4 (44.89) |
| Average precipitation days | 8.3 | 11.4 | 14.6 | 13.6 | 15.5 | 13.5 | 6.1 | 9.9 | 9.6 | 6.0 | 8.5 | 7.3 | 124.3 |
| Average relative humidity (%) | 80.8 | 84.2 | 83.1 | 83.9 | 86.9 | 88.0 | 85.8 | 86.4 | 82.4 | 76.6 | 80.4 | 77.7 | 83.0 |
| Mean monthly sunshine hours | 90.3 | 73.4 | 107.6 | 120.7 | 120.1 | 146.0 | 258.8 | 235.0 | 171.4 | 160.3 | 101.2 | 108.7 | 1,693.5 |
Source: Central Weather Bureau

Typhoons are most likely to strike between July and October, with on average about four direct hits per year. Intensive rain from typhoons often leads to disastrous mudslides.

== Records ==
| Area | Max. temperature | | Date | Earliest recording |
| Area | °C | °F | Date | Earliest recording |
|---|---|---|---|---|
| Taipei City | 39.3 | 102.7 | 8 August 2013 | 1896 |
| Kaohsiung City | 37.6 | 99.7 | 15 September 2014 | 1932 |
| Taitung County | 40.2 | 104.4 | 9 May 2004 | |
| Taoyuan City | 37.9 | 100.2 | 15 September 2014 | |

== Climate change ==
Climate change in Taiwan has caused temperatures to rise by 1.4 degrees Celsius in the last 100 years. Sea level rise around Taiwan is occurring at twice the global rate. The government pledged to reduce emissions by 20% in 2030 and 50% in 2050, compared to 2005 levels.
