= Human rights in Taiwan =

Taiwan is a multi-party democracy. The 2000 presidential victory of Democratic Progressive Party (DPP) candidate Chen Shui-bian followed more than 50 years of rule by the Kuomintang (KMT) and marked the first transition from one political party to another in the Taiwanese history, reported by a Government Information Office (GIO) website as the "first ever in Chinese history". This followed gradual democratic reforms since the 1980s and 1990s; most notably, martial law was lifted in 1987, and the Temporary Provisions Effective During the Period of Communist Rebellion were repealed in 1991 for Republic of China Constitution to be effective in Taiwan. The human rights record in Taiwan is generally held to have experienced significant transformation since the 1990s.

The citizens in Taiwan can change their government through elections and are held to enjoy most basic rights, according to a 2004 Freedom House report. Freedom House rates Taiwan as among the most "Free" nations in Asia, with a 1 in both Political Rights and Civil Liberties (scale of 1–7, with 1 being the highest). This represents a significant improvement, as the 1973 rating was 6.5, rising to 2.1 by 2000. For much of the history of the Kuomintang (KMT) regime in Taiwan, from the retreat from the mainland in 1949 until the 1970s and 1980s, the state was highly autocratic and varying degrees of repression of political and civil rights existed. The Legislative Yuan debated and ratified the International Covenant on Civil and Political Rights and the International Covenant on Economic, Social and Cultural Rights on March 31, 2009.

== History ==
=== Taiwan under Japanese rule ===
The human rights during the Japanese rule era experienced dramatic changes with three major phases. After the 1895 defeat of the Republic of Formosa, the Empire of Japan annexed Taiwan. The early Japanese administration appointed military governors. The colonial policies often limited the human rights of the Taiwanese people. After the Tapani incident in 1915 and Japan's involvement in World War I, the colonial governance was gradually liberalized. Taiwan became an extension of the Japanese Home Islands and the Taiwanese people were educated under a policy of assimilation.

The last phase of Japanese rule began with the eruption of the Second Sino-Japanese War in 1937. As the Japanese became active in international military affairs, its militarism rose. Its goal now was to fully Japanize Taiwan. In the meantime, laws were made to grant Taiwanese membership in the Japanese Diet, which theoretically would qualify a Taiwanese to become the prime minister of Japan eventually.

=== Taiwan under the Republic of China ===
Some of the autocracy in early Nationalist China also reflects a continuation of the political attitudes of Taiwan in the early decades after its founding in 1912. Many Chinese leaders, following the thought of Sun Yat-sen, held it necessary to maintain strong centralized control, including a militarized regime, during the early part of the regime's history, feeling that the populace was "not ready" for full democracy. Political repression was heavy during the early Kuomintang-Taiwan period in the mainland under Chiang Kai-shek, who would retreat to Taiwan following the Chinese Civil War.

Additionally, the history of Taiwan after 1945, in terms of political situation and human rights, displays multiple similarities with that of the Republic of Korea (South Korea). Between the end of World War II and the 1980s, a similar degree of autocracy and centralization existed, followed by eventual democratization by two states. Both Taiwan and South Korea went on to become leading economic players in Asia, part of the Asian Tigers, and both are now recognized as relatively free societies with successful human rights developments in most areas.

The Asian values debate, which holds that the political and cultural traditions of Asia justify a certain degree of autocratic rule to enable the rapid economic development of society puts Taiwanese human rights in interesting perspective. These ideas were prevalent among many important leaders in Malaysia, Singapore, and elsewhere with seemingly Western-style democratic Constitutions coupled with authoritarian one-party rule, in the 1990s. Moreover, some in mainland China, including Peking University scholar Pan Wei Bo, feel the most effective and appropriate political structure for the Chinese people is a relatively centralized state under rule of law, with some degree of popular consultation. There are also debates as to the government's right to police social behaviours. For instance, a municipal councillor suggested that Taiwan's low fertility rate could be alleviated by making employers penalise unmarried and childless workers; this suggestion was widely rebuked for its infringement of the rights of the individual.

Capital punishment exists in Taiwan. National police and security agencies are, however, under effective civilian control, although isolated reports of human rights abuse still surface occasionally. Taiwanese residents generally enjoyed a high standard of living and a relatively equitable income distribution. The government generally respected the human rights of citizens; however, there were problems in some areas. Instances of police abuse of persons in police custody, official corruption, violence and discrimination against women, child prostitution and abuse, and trafficking of women and children occurred.

In recent years, Taiwan's laws have focused on combating sexual discrimination, granting greater accommodation to conscientious objectors (Republic of China has obligatory national service), and upholding cultural and linguistic pluralism. In 2001, the Ministry of Justice issued a draft version of the Basic Law on the Guarantees of Human Rights. For significant periods of Taiwan's history, both before and after 1949, when the Republic of China lost control of mainland China while only maintaining control of Taiwan, linguistic and cultural rights for minorities or non-power holding groups were often repressed. For example, local dialects such as Taiwanese (or any other non-Mandarin spoken variants spoken by the Taiwanese) were restricted in the mass media to promote the use of Mandarin as the common language.

== Labor rights ==
The labor movement in Taiwan began in the 1980s near the end of military rule.

=== Foreign workers ===
There are more than 700,000 guest workers in Taiwan. Most are from Indonesia, Vietnam, and the Philippines. A murky system of recruitment and brokerage agencies leaves foreign workers vulnerable to debt bondage. Most foreign workers live in dorms either inside the factories they work at or on the grounds of these factories. These dorms have faced significant criticism for sub-standard conditions and overcrowding. Up to 30 workers may share a single room, though numbers of four to eight per room are more common. Undocumented workers often have particularly bad living conditions. Domestic workers are required by law to live with their employing family and can not live outside their home. Many caretakers for the elderly and disabled sleep in the same room as the person they are caring for and lack their own space entirely. Employers in both industrial and domestic setting are allowed to deduct the cost of housing, food, etc. from their employee's wages.

In March 2020 a fire at a factory in Taichung killed three Vietnamese workers living in the onsite dormitory. This tragedy renewed calls from labor rights activists for the abolishment of onsite dorms for foreign workers.

== Human Trafficking ==
The 2020 Trafficking in Persons Report by the U.S. State Department classifies Taiwan as Tier 1, meaning that Taiwan meets the minimum standards for combating trafficking in persons. The report states that Taiwanese "[a]uthorities continued to demonstrate serious and sustained efforts during the reporting period," leading to the department to keep Taiwan at Tier 1.

== Fishing industry ==
Taiwan's high seas fishing industry has bucked the trend of rapid improvement in human rights. Official Taiwanese sources put the number of foreign workers aboard Taiwanese vessels at 26,000 but NGOs and US government agencies put the figure around 160,000. Foreign fishermen frequently report non-payment, long work hours, and verbal and physical abuse at the hands of their captains and officers, who are often Taiwanese.

Between August 2018 and November 2019, the Environmental Justice Foundation interviewed 71 former Indonesian fishers who had previously worked on 62 Taiwanese vessels. Of these workers, 24% reported violent physical abuse, 92% reported having their wages withheld, and 82% reported working excessive overtime. In addition, 8 vessels were reported harpooning dolphins to use as shark bait, half the vessels finned sharks and discarded the bodies, and 7 of the boats captured and killed false killer whales.

The 2020 Trafficking in Persons Report reported that Taiwanese-flagged and -owned fishing vessels in Taiwan's Distant Water Fleet (DWF) are staffed by both documented and undocumented migrant workers from many countries, including Montenegro, Solomon Islands, Vietnam, Indonesia, China, and the Philippines. The U.S. State Department also reports that current regulations still contain loopholes that can perpetuate debt bondage, such as allowing unlimited fees for recruitment and unspecified "reasonable service items." The Report also included that migrant fishermen "working on Taiwan-owned and -flagged fishing vessels experience non- or under-payment of wages, long working hours, physical abuse, lack of food or medical care, denial of sleep and substandard safety equipment, and poor living conditions while indebted to complex, multinational brokerage networks." Migrant fishermen also report "senior crewmembers employ such coercive tactics as threats of physical violence, beatings, withholding of food and water, retention of identity documents, wage deductions, and non-contractual compulsory sharing of vessel operational costs to retain their labor." These abuses are particularly prevalent in the DWF, with the vessels often stopping in remote islands and "mother ships", disabling transponders, fishing for years at a time, changing vessel names, and switching workers between vessels to evade law enforcement.

=== Regulation ===
Unlike any other industry in Taiwan, the distant waters fishing fleet is not within the jurisdiction of the labor ministry. It is instead regulated by the Fisheries Agency which also has a mandate to support the industry. This responsibility for championing both the industry and protecting labor has been characterized as a conflict of interest by Greenpeace. In 2017 the Taiwanese Government introduced the Act for Distant Water Fisheries which was intended to increase government control and oversight over Taiwan's approximately 2,000 distant water fishing vessels. In particular the act sought to safeguard the rights of foreign workers aboard the vessels.

Taiwan requires vessels to have a vessel monitoring system and any vessels engaging in transshipments at sea must report their movements within a short period of time, often a few hours. However, this information is not open to public inquiry and infractions are rarely reported or enforced.

In 2016, Taiwan's Council of Agriculture announced the Act for Distant Water Fisheries. Article 1 states that "[t]his Act is enacted to ensure the conservation of marine fisheries resources, strengthen distant water fisheries management, curb illegal, unreported, and unregulated... fishing, and improve traceability of catches and fisheries products, so as to promote the sustainable operation of distant water fisheries."

In 2019, the EU lifted its IUU "yellow card" designation for Taiwan, following increased efforts by the government to address IUU fishing and reform the industry. A "red card" designation would have resulted in exports from Taiwan being banned in the EU market.

NOAA's 2021 Report to Congress on Improving International Fisheries Management cites Taiwanese vessels continuing to violate "conservation measures in the WCPFC, IATTC, and ICCAT convention areas in 2018, 2019, or 2020 and for failing to take appropriate corrective actions."

=== Incidents ===
In 2015, an Indonesian fisherman named Supriyanto died aboard the Taiwan-flagged Fu Tzu Chun under suspicious circumstances. The initial report by Taiwan's FA reported that he died of an infection. However, his body was thrown overboard, resurfacing in Taiwan, and fellow crew members corroborated that his death was due to the abuse by the captain and two crew members.

In February 2019, eight foreign crew members were murdered by their officers aboard the Taiwan-flagged fishing vessel Wen Peng approximately 900 nautical miles off the south coast of Sri Lanka. Two were killed on the vessel and six were forced overboard, their bodies were never recovered.

In June 2019, a 19-year-old Indonesian on board a Taiwanese fishing vessel died. A Fijian coroner ruled it due to a pulmonary edema. Fellow crew members corroborated that he received regular physical punishment in the head and neck, and only intervention from the crew prevented his body from being tossed overboard.

Four fisheries observers have disappeared or died on Taiwanese-flagged or -owned fishing vessels, and the cases are still unsolved.

== LGBT rights in Taiwan ==
Taiwan legalized same-sex marriage after a 2017 court ruling, becoming the first country in Asia to do so.

== Freedom of expression ==
In 2020 Taiwan denied a Filipino extradition request for a Filipino domestic worker wanted for criticizing President Rodrigo Duterte online. Taiwan's Ministry of Foreign Affairs which denied the request stated that she has the same right to freedom of speech while legally in Taiwan as any Taiwanese citizen.

== See also ==
- National Human Rights Commission (Taiwan)
- Transitional Justice Commission
- February 28 Incident
- Capital punishment in Taiwan
- Censorship in Taiwan
- Corporal punishment in Taiwan
