= Corporal punishment in Taiwan =

Corporal punishment is banned in the penal and education systems of the Republic of China (Taiwan), but there are no laws banning its use in the home. However, as of 22 March 2023, there is a draft amendment of Article 1085 of the Civil Law that may make some forms of corporal punishment in the home illegal if it comes into effect.

== Education system ==
"The State should protect students' rights to learning, to education, to their physical integrity and their human dignity, and should protect them from any form of corporal punishment, which constitutes a physical and psychological violation."

— Article 8 of the Fundamental Law of Education (since December 2006)

Corporal punishment in the education system was banned in December 2006 through an amendment to the country's Fundamental Law of Education which came into force in January 2007. The prohibition applies to all educational institutions, including public and private schools and kindergartens, universities and all types of "cram" schools.

The amendment followed years of campaigning by child rights organizations such as the Humanistic Education Foundation, as well as the government's commitment in August 2005 to work towards the elimination of all corporal punishment in public education. Contributing to the amendment was also a public debate generated by corporal punishment case in October 2005 which attracted widespread media attention. The case involved a teacher repeatedly hitting a student with a wooden stick on the hands and backside for failing to hand in homework.

The amendment banning corporal punishment had the support of President Chen Shui-bian and Prime Minister Frank Hsieh and was passed by a wide margin in the Legislative Yuan. Kuan Bi-ling, a legislator from the Democratic Progressive Party said:

Corporal punishment has been a cultural practice in Taiwan. But we believe schools and homes are the most important environment for kids to grow up and we need to eliminate this practice... Many countries worldwide have banned corporal punishment in schools by law – including [the People's Republic of] China. We think Taiwan is an advanced country, and we shouldn't trail behind.

Corporal punishment in Taiwanese schools had been banned even before the legal amendment of 2006, but this was by a government regulation rather than by statute.

=== Prevalence ===
Before the legal ban, corporal punishment on students of both genders had been widespread and equal in Taiwanese educational institutions; the government regulation against it was largely ignored. A 2004 poll found that corporal punishment was administered in 93.5% of schools.

Percentage of students who have experienced corporal punishment
1999	2000	2001	2004	2005
83.4%	74.2%	70.9%	69.4%	65.1%
Source: Humanistic Education Foundation

Despite its being illegal since January 2007, a nationwide survey conducted in April and May 2007 found that 52.8% of students reported receiving corporal punishment, lower than in previous years but still constituting a majority. However, physical beatings or spankings of students declined from 51% in 2005 to 27.3% in 2007, accompanied by a rise in indirect forms of physical punishment, such as being forced to stand up for an extended period of time, which increased from 9.7% in 2005 to 35% in 2007.

The Humanistic Education Foundation has conducted a yearly poll to ascertain the percentage of students affected by corporal punishment in Taiwanese schools. A nationwide survey carried out in September and October 2012 found that corporal punishment is still imposed in 90% of elementary and junior-high schools around the nation. This suggests that the ban has been partially effective; while a majority of students continued to be subject to corporal punishment, its use was slowly declining.

== Penal system ==
Corporal punishment is illegal as a disciplinary measure in penal institutions.

In 1909, when Formosa (as Taiwan was then known) was part of the Empire of Japan, the local government introduced judicial flogging for native Formosan Chinese criminals, which was carried out with a cane. This penalty was regarded as a substitute for imprisonment, and applied to males aged between 16 and 60.

In 1997 the Taiwanese authorities said they would consider calls for the introduction of judicial caning on the lines of practice in Singapore to deter crime.

In March 2007, a member of the Democratic Progressive Party called for the caning of sex offenders, but this idea was rejected by the Ministry of Justice. A question about caning was proposed for the 2026 Taiwanese referendum. After the Central Election Commission rejected the proposed question, Kuomintang members of the Legislative Yuan sought to pass legislation on judicial caning.

== See also ==
- Human rights in the Republic of China
