= History of education in Taiwan =

The recorded history of education in Taiwan can be traced back to the Dutch colonial period.

== Dutch Formosa ==
In 1636, the Dutch started a school for the Sinckan people that not only featured religious instruction, but also provided schooling in Western literature. Because the Dutch advocated missionary work to be done in the native language, the school was taught in the Sinckan language. The missionary Robertus Junius recorded in his 1643 education report that the Sinckan school had enrolled 80 students, of which 24 were learning to write and 8 to 10 had solid penmanship, while in neighboring Baccaluan (modern-day Anding) school there were 90 students, of which 8 knew how to write.

Aside from proselytizing, the missionaries also compiled dictionaries and books of religious doctrine; they translated the Gospel of Matthew into Sinckan and also compiled a vocabulary of Favorlang, another aboriginal language. These would become important sources for later research. The most important Sinckan documents were the contracts between the Sinckan and the Han settlers.

== Qing dynasty ==
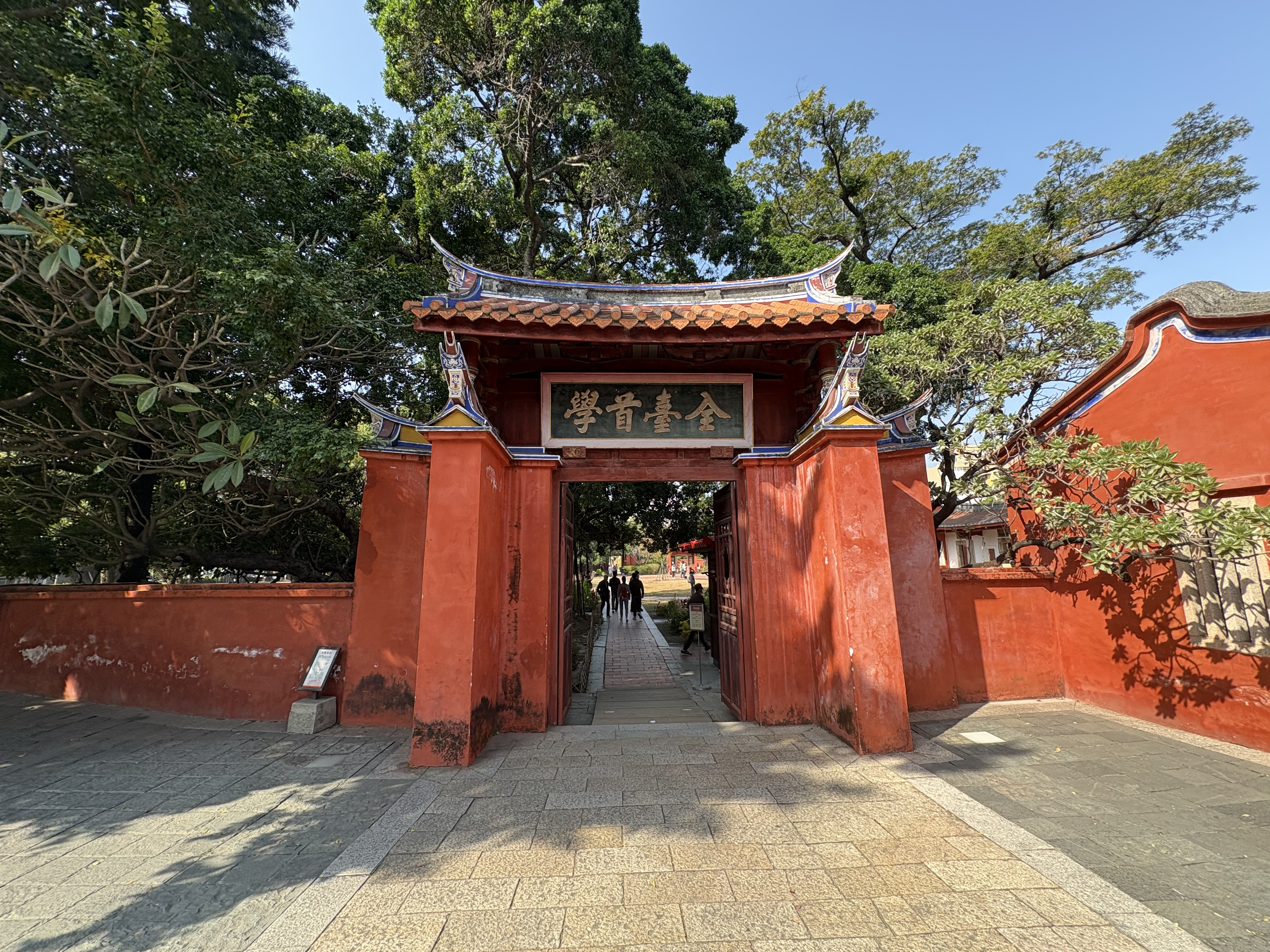
The gate with the sign 全臺首學 (first academy of Taiwan) at Tainan Confucius Temple

Under Qing dynasty rule, many traditional schools were established, mostly studying Chinese classics such as the teachings of Confucius. Education was limited to the children of well-to-do parents, as public and free schools did not exist. "Even the paid schools limited their instruction to the usual Chinese curriculum, which is devoted first to the study of the characters, and, if a higher education is desired, to the mastering of the Chinese classics...There were none of the studies which in western lands and in Japan are considered necessary for an educated man, and the general tendency of their training was to increase conservatism and love for ancient customs."

== Empire of Japan ==
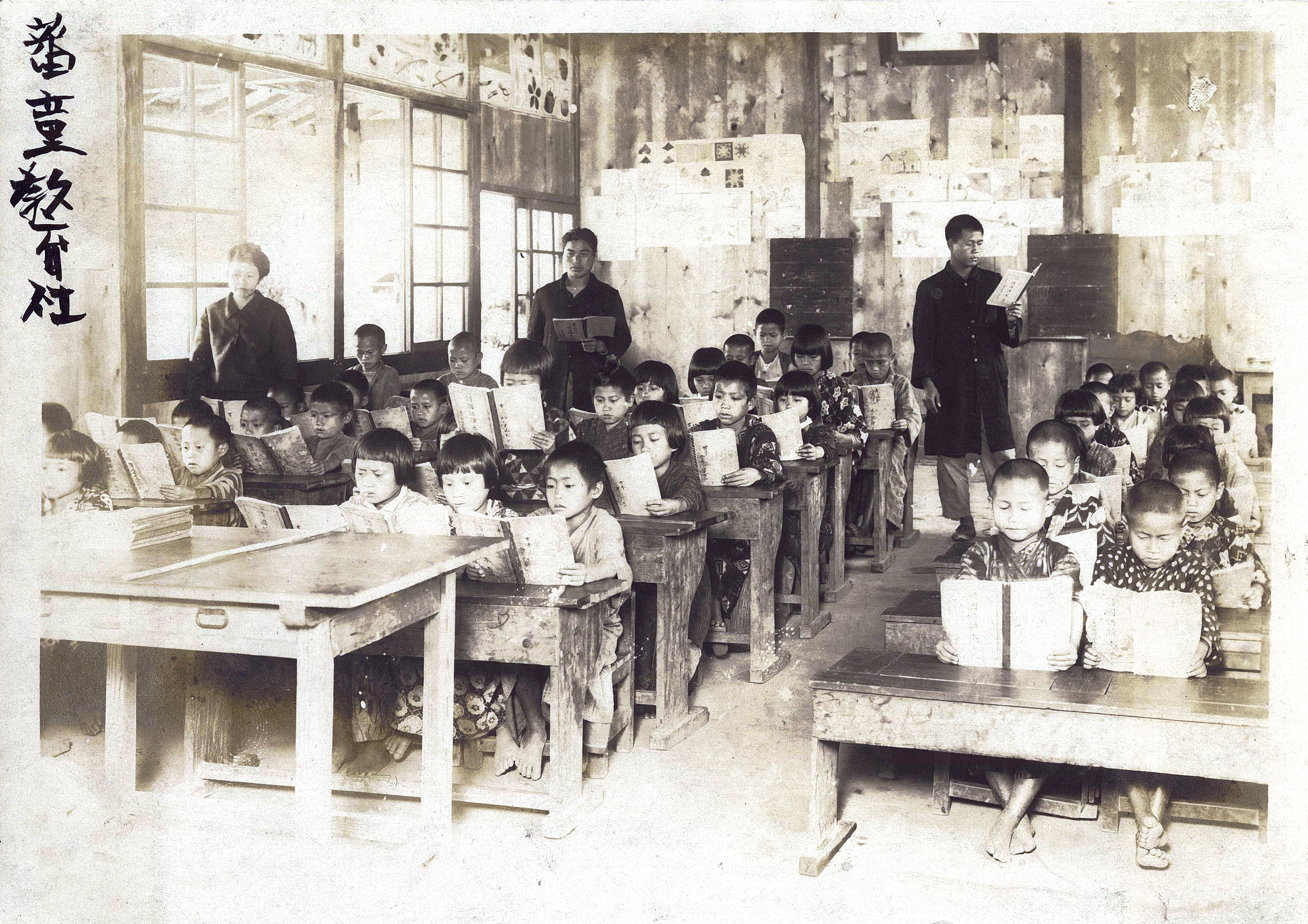
Elementary school during the Japanese period (蕃童教育所)

During the Japanese period school attendance for Taiwanese children increased from 3.8% in 1904 to 71.3% in 1943 and literacy in Taiwan became common. Modern schools were formed with widespread establishment of primary schools while higher schooling for Taiwanese people remained rare and secondary schools and colleges were mostly for Japanese nationals. In special cases Taiwanese did receive higher schooling and many went to Japan for further studies.

== Republic of China and martial law ==
After Taiwan came under control of the Republic of China in 1945, education in Taiwan became a synthesis of the Japanese system and the Chinese system implemented by the Kuomintang (KMT) government. During the first 20 years of KMT rule, mandatory schooling consisted of six years of primary school education, which was also the length under Japanese rule. In 1968, this was extended to nine years.

After taking control of Taiwan, the Republic of China sought to remodel education on the island, a process that involved politicizing public schools and curtailing private ones. This became more urgent when the ROC and its Nationalist government exiled themselves to the island in 1949 to escape the Chinese Communist Party and the incipient People's Republic of China, which later model its education system aligning with the Soviet Union. Education reassumed a colonial dimension, this time to create a new national identity (a process referred to by Taiwanese scholar Ting-Hong Wong as “national colonialism”).

During a 1953 visit to Taiwan, Vice President Richard Nixon stated that the United States would help turn Taiwan into an anti-communist military and cultural bastion. In 1954, the United States began providing significant funding for education in Taiwan, including to attract overseas Chinese. These efforts also helped the KMT to consolidate its power on Taiwan. In 1958, the period of compulsory education was lengthened from six to nine years.

In the late 1950s, the government yielded to pressure from both older Taiwanese communities and recent waishengren immigrants, and enacted a series of education reforms, including the restoration of private schools (with measures taken to ensure their political loyalty). Aspects of politicized education in Taiwan included a mandatory university level course, which had first been introduced by the Kuomintang in mainland China in 1944 as "party principles". The course later became known as the "Three Principles of the People". The Ministry of Education expanded the course to all levels of education in 1950, and renamed the university-level course "Sun Yat-sen Thought" in 1964.

== Modern era ==
The Council of Grand Justices ruled against mandatory university courses in 1995, and questions relating to Sun Yat-sen Thought were eventually removed from the General Scholastic Ability Test in 1999. In August 2011, the Executive Yuan confirmed that a full twelve-year compulsory education program would be implemented by 2014. Ma Ying-jeou's successor Tsai Ing-wen continued implementing the 12-year educational system.

== See also ==
- Education in Taiwan
- Sinkang Manuscripts
