= Labor movement in Taiwan =

The labor movement in Taiwan did not start until the 1980s, after the end of martial law in Taiwan. Many of these labor movements began when Kuomintang became more lenient with social movements. In addition, with the help of non-KMT political figures, such as members of the Democratic Progressive Party, many labor unions and State-owned enterprise administrations removed KMT's influence, and this reshaped a huge economic sector of Taiwan from being strictly controlled by the state.

== History ==
=== Prior to martial law ===
During the period of martial law in Taiwan from 1949, the Kuomintang (KMT) prohibited the formation of new political parties, outlawed collective action including labor strikes, and censored all media. It built Leninist-style party organizations in major factories, and state corporates and factory organizers worked together to tackle worker's subjections. The KMT government also executed a national industrialization policy that led to the development of many specific industries including transportation, electricity, petroleum, and telecommunications as state-owned or public companies. Labor unions were then formed to support the state and its economic plan, instead of providing a collective bargaining platform for workers in these state-own industries. It was not until the 1980s when the emergence of new political forces from the new middle class emerged within Taiwan, weakening the Kuomintang's strong opposition to social movements. The Democratic Progressive Party was formed in 1986, and martial law ended in 1987. Initially, the labor movements focused on issues such as overtime and annual bonuses, but then this movement turned into seizures of labor unions. Many corporates had close ties with the Kuomintang, but with the labor movements, the KMT party branches lost their privileges within these enterprises.

=== Post-martial law ===
In the early 1990s, labor unions began to demand that the KMT withdraw its force and influence from unions. They did so by spreading stories of party corruption, and worked with the DPP to uncover illegal activities of the KMT. During the 1997 Asian financial crisis, labor disputes and unemployment issues were brought to the attention of the government, and workers began to recognize the importance of autonomous unions. After the 2000 election, the Kuomintang lost its position as the ruling party in both the Legislative Yuan and the executive branch. The Democratic Progressive Party introduced a bill to revise the Labor Standards Law and tried to set a legal limit of 44 working hours per week. However, after compromising with the KMT, the bill was revised to set the legal working period to 84 hours per two weeks. This law went into effect in 2001. This was seen as the first move of the DPP asserting their executive power over labor movements.

In addition to the revision of Labor Standards law, the state also revised Union law and Labor Dispute Mediation law. The organization of labor in the 1980s did not have much involvement of opposition political figures. However, workers followed their agendas and asserted their opposition to the enterprises and the government. As the labor movement progressed, there was also an increase in disputes between workers and their employers. The number of disputed cases rose from 1609 cases in 1987 to 10955 cases in 2001. There was also an increase in union membership as the labor movement progressed. The unionization rate increased from 37.58% in 1987 to 39.40% in 2001. In addition, many state-owned enterprises privatized starting 1989, and about 30 companies privatized between 1989 and 2003. The privatization of state-owned enterprises was not because these companies faced economic pressure such as debts, but from political and macro-economic conditions.

In 1997 the Taiwan Confederation of Trade Unions was formed.
