= Horn-shaped jade ring =

Kind of Neolithic bracelet found in Taiwan

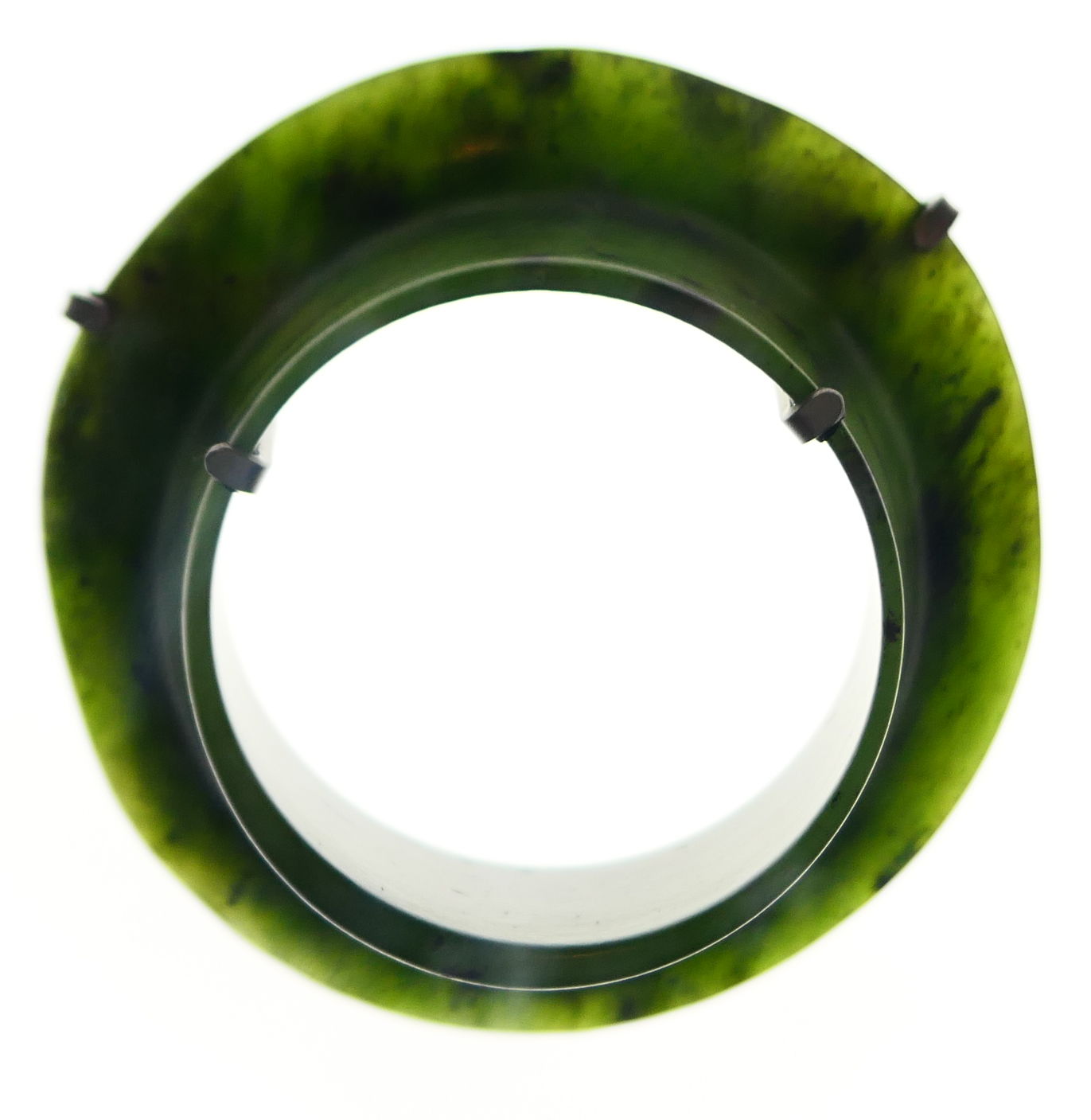
Horn-shaped jade ring (National Treasure) collected in National Museum of Prehistory, Taiwan.

A horn-shaped jade ring, also known as a trumpet-shaped jade ring (Chinese: 喇叭形玉環; pinyin: lǎ ba xíng yù huán) is a kind of prehistoric single-bulged bracelet found in Taiwan. It is carved and polished from one individual jade, with a section in "L" shape. One side of the bracelet extends externally, forming the shape of a trumpet. The arc of the extending part is extremely smooth. The marks of rotational cutting are not seen on the bracelet itself, and the largest periphery is not aligned... Many of such jade ornaments have been unearthed in late Neolithic archaeological sites, among which the Peinan Site has found 8 horn-shaped jade rings in total

== Functions ==
Among the bracelets found in the Peinan Site, slate bracelets with 1 to 7 parts wearing on one wrist or both wrists account for the most. On the other hand, the horn-shaped jade ring were usually used as a single ornament on the left arm of females. The trumpet-like opening is heading towards the top, and the ornament itself can reach the joint of the elbow. The horn-shaped jade ring is usually buried along with tube bead necklace or bell-shaped jade beads (also known as bell-shaped jade strung ornaments). As bell-shaped jade beads were previous and rare, it’s suspected the owner of both had a special social status

== Distribution ==
Horn-shaped jade rings were found mostly in the Peinan Site. During the salvage archaeological excavation in the 1980s, the Taitung County Government had collected at least 2 specimens while National Taiwan University had 6. Besides the Peinan Site, the ornaments were also unearthed from at least 3 archaeological sites across Taiwan: one in Wanshan Site, Yilan; one in the cultural layer from the first location of Kukeng Tapingting Site, Yunlin; and one fragment in the Wushantou phase of Tahu Culture of Peisanshe Site, Tainan. These ornaments were unearthed from the sites later in terms of period than the one in Peinan Site, with smaller shapes

== Discussion on the Origins ==
In other regions near Taiwan, around the same or earlier period, double-bulged bracelet and single-bulged bracelet were trending in southern or southwestern China. The materials were either jade or bronze, and double-bulged bracelets accounted for the most. No double-bulged or bronze bracelets has been found in Taiwan so far. Therefore, some scholars believe that the single-bulged bracelets in Taiwan and the horn-shaped jade rings undergoing transformation seem not to originate from southern or southwestern China directly but were rather indirectly affected by Mainland Southeast Asia.

== Designated national treasure ==
Among the horn-shaped jade rings unearthed in the Peinan Site and collected in the National Museum of Prehistory, one of them is made of emerald and transparent jade. The ornament is in complete shape and of fine quality, displaying it’s uniqueness in style and the excellence of jade craftsmanship in prehistoric Taiwan. It can be dated back to 4,000 to 3,500 years ago (4,000-3,500 B.P.; or 2,050-1,550 BC), and was designated as a national treasure by the Ministry of Culture in 2012.
