= Frog-shaped jade ornament =

Ancient Taiwanese artefact

- Frog-shaped jade ornament (National Treasure) collected in National Museum of Prehistory.
- Material: Nephrite
- Size: length: 3.64 cm width: 2.7 cm
- Created: c. 600 BC
- Discovered: 1994; Hualien, Taiwan
- Present location: Taitung City, Taitung, Taiwan

The Frog-shaped jade ornament is an ancient artifact unearthed in the archaeological site at Yenliao, Hualien, Taiwan in 1994. It can be dated back to 2,800 to 2,300 years ago (B.P.; or 851-351 BC). It is one of the most significant jade ornaments of the Huakangshan Culture during the Neolithic period. It is thought to have been used as a pendant.

This ornament, made of nephrite (Taiwanese jade) is 36.4 millimetres (1.43 in) in length and 27 millimetres (1.1 in) in width. The shape is reminiscent of a frog, with a pair of big, round eyes, as well as forking limbs. There is a notch on the head, possibly to allow the ornament to be worn on a string. The ornament is unique and rare for being a complete animal-shaped jade ornament dating from prehistoric Taiwan. It demonstrates the jade production techniques of prehistoric Taiwan, and was therefore designated as a national treasure in 2014. It is now held in the National Museum of Prehistory collections.
