= 福山 =

福山, literally "blessing mountain(s)", may refer to:

- Fushan (disambiguation), the Chinese transliteration
- Fukuyama (disambiguation), the Japanese transliteration
