= Fushan (archaeological site) =

Archaeological site in Taiwan

Fushan archaeological site (Chinese: 富山考古遺址; pinyin: fù shān kǎo gǔ yí zhǐ) is located in Fushan Village, Beinan Township, Taitung County, Taiwan. The site dates from around 3,700 or 3,800 years ago to roughly 3,000 years ago (1,750-1,050 BCE), which belongs to the middle Neolithic Period. Fushan Culture is named after the site. In 1997, the site was divided into Fushan First Site in the south and Fushan Second Site in the north when conducting the “General Investigation and Research Project of Archaeological Sites in Taiwan.”

== Brief history ==
The investigation of the site began as early as 1989, when Professor Huang, Shih-Chiang from the Department of Anthropology, NTU led his students to survey the surface and excavate for the fieldwork course. Later, in 1990, professors Lien, Chao-Mei and Sung, Wen-Hsun from the Department of Anthropology, NTU also surveyed the site. In 1994, Li, Kun-Hsiu and Yeh, Mei-Chen from the National Museum of Prehistory surveyed the site and excavated 15 pits, 13 of which were in the southern zone (Fushan First Site) with an obvious accumulation of artifacts in the cultural layer; the other 2 pits were in the northern zone (Fushan Second Site), with only pottery fragments and no obvious cultural layer. The unearthed objects included 133,454 pieces of pottery fragments, 563 pieces of stone specimens, and 256 pieces of ecological remains. In 1997, Tsang, Cheng-Hua from the Institute of History and Philology, Academia Sinica and Yeh, Mei-Chen from the National Museum of Prehistory hosted the fourth “General Investigation and Research Project of Archeological Sites in Taiwan” entrusted by the Ministry of the Interior; they investigated the site, divided it into Fushan First Site and Fushan Second Site in the report, and also suggested listing Fushan First Site as a designated site

== Discoveries ==
After years of survey and excavation, only a single cultural layer has been identified, which is the Fushan Culture during the mid-Neolithic Period. The artifacts include stone tools such as axe-hoe shaped tools for agricultural purposes or lumbering., stone knives and stone sickles for harvesting crops, stone needles, and net sinkers, of which the stone needles are particularly abundant. For the pottery containers, most of them are decorated with cord-marked patterns, and some of them can be seen with leftover red paints or some painted themes, such as fence pattern, round dots, and wide-strip pattern; spindle whorls were also found. Other artifacts included jade artifacts, such as jade earrings, jade bracelets, and tube beads. Also, slate coffins were also discovered in the site, and was regarded as a proof that the culture might be, a predecessor of Peinan Culture

== Featured Artifacts ==
The bowls with cord-marked patterns are commonly seen in many cultures and archaeological sites, but the ones unearthed at Fushan Site are different; the bowls unearthed from the sites of Fushan Culture have handles, but there are no handles on the bowls from other cultures and archaeological sites. It is speculated that those bowls with handles could be a cultural inheritance.
