= Stone ladder (Taiwan) =

Archaeological stone artifact

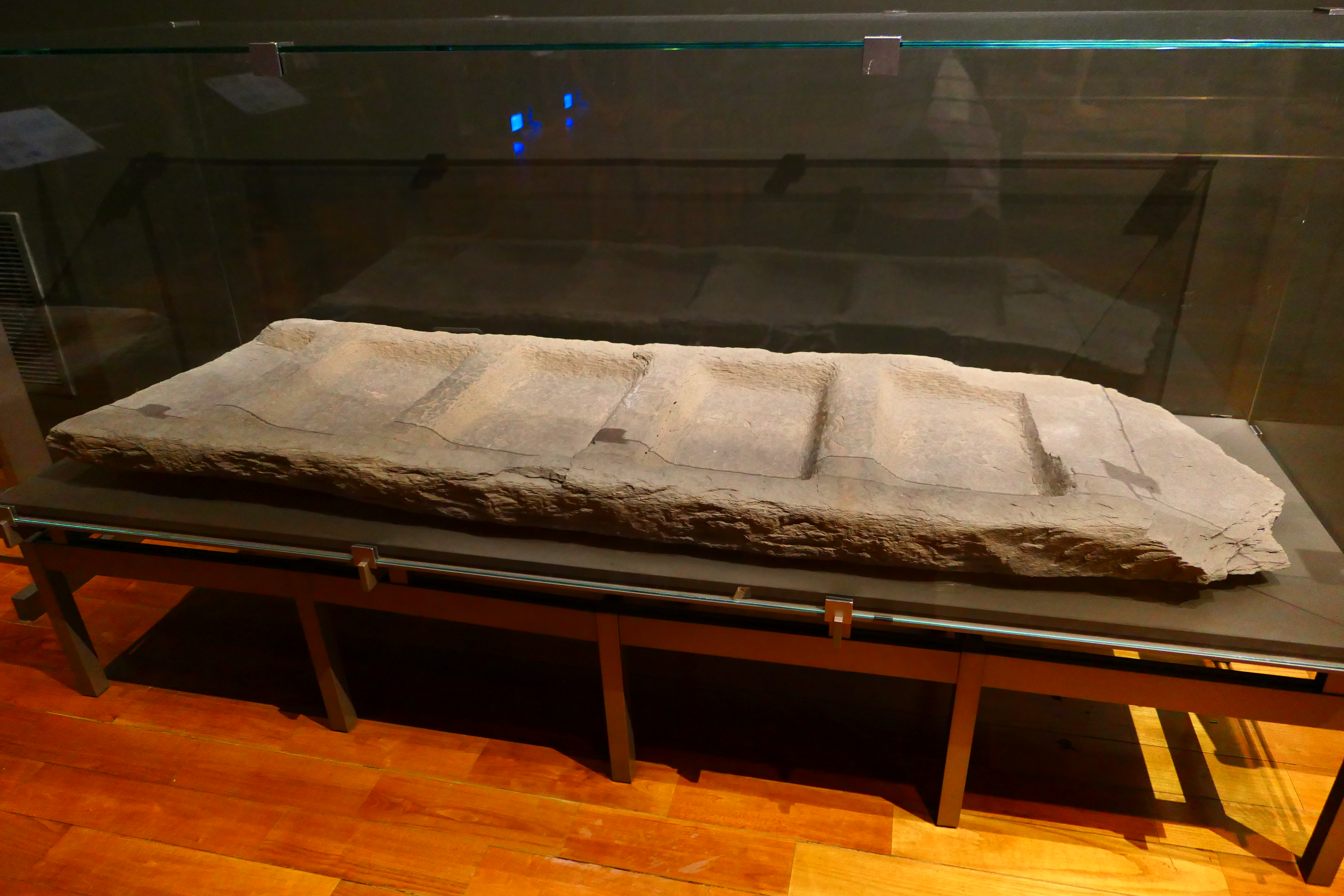
Stone ladder exhibited at the National Museum of Prehistory, Taiwan.

The stone ladder, also known as a stone container or large stone trough in its early stages when its function was not clear, is an archaeological artifact discovered in Taiwan that is now believed to have a high probability of being used as a ladder based on use-wear, morphology, and computer simulation of data.

Early studies on the stone ladder suggested that it was made of graywacke, metasandstone, and schist. However, recent observations indicate that it was more likely made of a single piece of quartz-mica slate.

Initially, based on ethnographic analogies and references to the lifestyles of the Amis and Tao people, it was believed that the stone ladder might have been used as a feed trough for pigs. However, the observation of a single slope side, coupled with the evidence of unidirectional wear on surfaces, now supports the function of the artifact, which was primarily used as a ladder.

Subsequent observations, digital simulations, and statistical analysis have revealed that the central part of the inclined surface is smoother compared to the sides, suggesting that it was the main area used for climbing. Additionally, the first step of the ladder exhibits less use-wear, indicating that it was likely the initial point of contact during ascent. Through calculations by computer software, experts estimated that the angle of inclination for leaning against the ladder was approximately between 40 and 60 degrees, and the climbing height could reach around 110-130 centimeters.

To date, a total of 14 recorded excavated stone ladders have been discovered at the Peinan Site, with an additional one found at the Laofanshe Site. These artifacts are predominantly rectangular-shaped with 5-6 ladder grooves. The solid and heavy structure of the stone ladder, along with the requirement for large stone blocks during its construction, has led some scholars to speculate that it was not used for ordinary housing purposes.

One stone ladder, excavated from the Peinan Site and known as the "Peinan Culture Rock Carving Stone Ladder," was officially designated as an important cultural artifact in 2014. It is currently stored at the National Museum of Prehistory in Taiwan.
