= Beater =

Beater may refer to:

== Music ==
- Any of various types of percussion mallets
  - A rute
  - The striking part of a Bass drum pedal
  - The cipín used for playing the bodhrán

== Fiction ==
- A position in the fictional game of Quidditch from the Harry Potter series
- Another name for Glamdring, Gandalf's sword, in J.R.R. Tolkien's The Hobbit
- A name the main character Kirito, takes in the anime Sword Art Online

== Tools ==
- Bark beater, tools used to pound tree bark to make it softer, for crafts
- Beater (weaving), a tool used to force woven yarn into place
- Carpet beater, a housecleaning tool used to beat carpets, clothes, and bedding to shake the dust and dirt out of them.
- Fire beater
- Hollander beater, machine used in papermaking to produce paper pulp
- An attachment for a cooking mixer
- Egg beater (disambiguation)

== Other uses ==
- Bruno Beater (1914–1982), East German intelligence officer and politician
- A harp seal, that is approximately 3–4 weeks to one year of age
- Beater (hunting), a person who drives game out of areas of cover during the hunt
- MV Beater, a sealer wrecked by Hurricane Daisy in October 1962
- A decrepit car, or (by extension) a car meant for daily use and not for show
