= Zoo-anthropomorphic jade earring =

Archaeological artifact and National Treasure in Taiwan

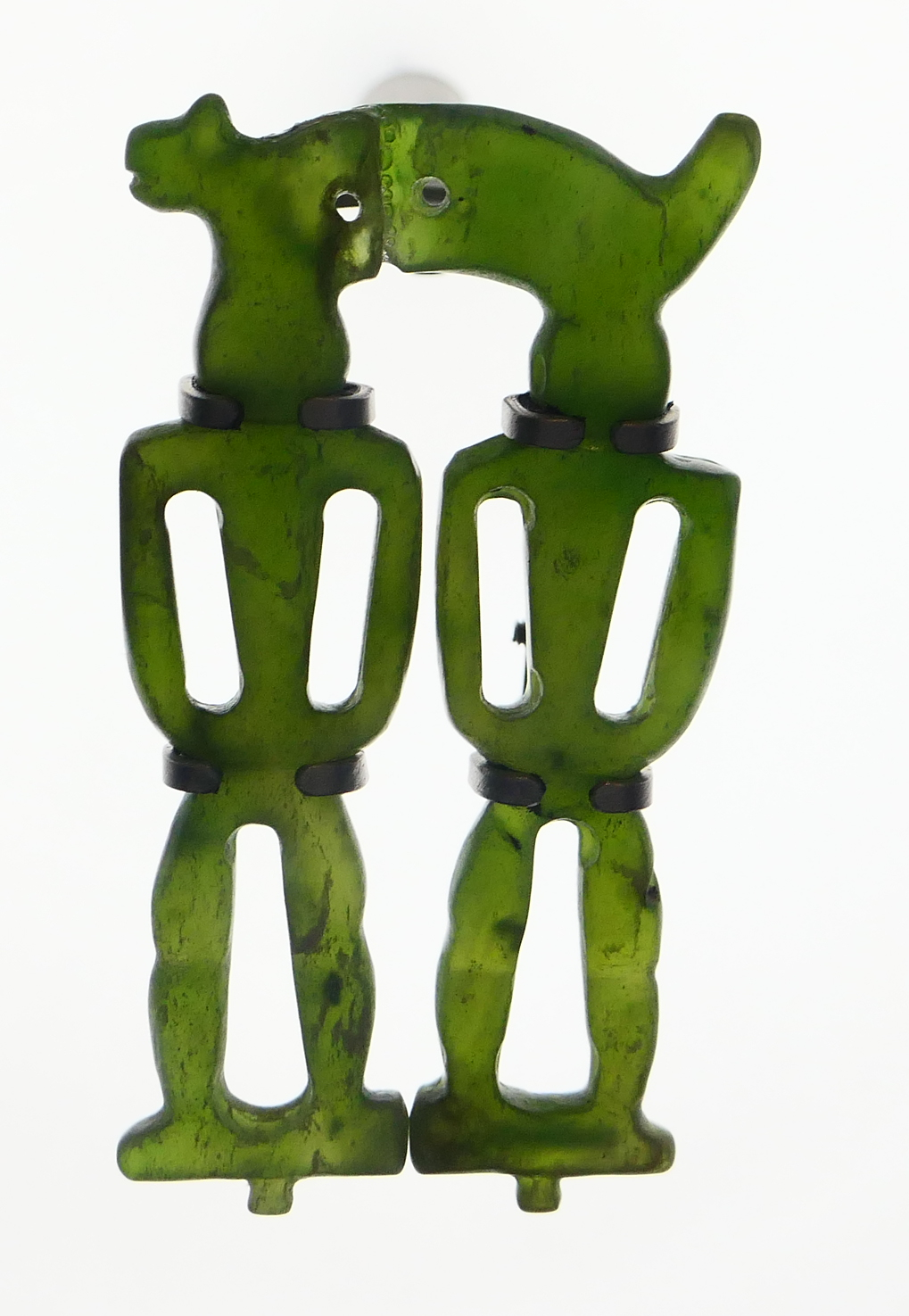
- Zoo-Anthropomorphic Jade Earring (National Treasure) collected in the National Museum of Prehistory
- Material: Jade
- Size: length: 6.9 cm width: 3.9 cm
- Created: c. 600 BC
- Discovered: 1984; Taiwan
- Present location: Taitung City, Taitung, Taiwan

Zoo-anthropomorphic Jade Earring (Chinese: 人獸形玉耳飾, 人獸形玉器, 人獸形玉玦; pinyin: rén-shòu-xíng-yù-ěr-shì, rén-shòu-xíng-yù-qì, rén-shòu-xíng-yù-jué) is a jade ornament design that dates back to the Neolithic Period in Taiwan. Specimens of this design are believed to have been worn as a pendant on the ears, given its notches and the evidence from unearthed contexts. The design features two human figures with their hands on their waists and their legs spread wide apart. On top of their heads is a beast that resembles a cat, pig, or deer. The feet of the beast are connected to the heads of the human figures. While there are variations, including single-person or multiple-ring designs, jade pendants of this design are primarily found in Taiwan.

== Records of Discoveries ==
Zoo-anthropomorphic jade earrings have been discovered across Taiwan, primarily in the northern and eastern regions. They have been found in archaeological sites associated with the Peinan (卑南), Huakangshan (花岡山), Yuanshan (圓山), and Wanshan (萬山) cultures. In total, there have been 41 findings across 9 archaeological sites, including 14 in the Chihshanyan Site in Taipei; 6 in the Peinan Site in Taitung, and 1 in Shihtiping Site, Hualien; 4 in Kangkou Site, Hualien; 1 in Takeng Site, Hualien; 1 in Wanshan Site, Yilan; 2 in Chula Site, Pintung; 1 in Sanpaopi Site, Tainan; and 1 in Shisanhang Site, New Taipei City.

== National Treasure Designation ==
One zoo-anthropomorphic jade earring, unearthed from the Peinan Site in 1984, was designated as a national treasure in 2012. It is now housed in the National Museum of Prehistory. The earring was discovered in a slate coffin along with other burial goods such as spearheads, tube beads, adzes, chisels and other burial goods. It is believed to have originated from a grand coffin with multiple burials, and dates back to approximately 2,800 to 2,300 years ago (B.P.; or 851-351 BC).

The human figures are intricately carved in an openwork style and stand on a horizontal plate attached to mastoids. The head and tail of the beast point skyward, although its body was fragmented before burial. There is a previously-repaired hole in the fragmented portion. The earring measures 69 mm in length, 39 mm in width, and 4.5mm in thickness. It weighs 17g.

Scholars speculate that the beast may represent the ancestral animal or totem symbolizing the tribe's origin. Alternatively, it could symbolize the successful hunting endeavors and the honorable return of the hunters.

In 2015, the zoo-anthropomorphic jade earrings were depicted on a Taiwanese stamp.

== Additional source ==
走讀臺灣✕走讀史前：追隨風暴之子的履跡 READ TAIWAN✕READ PREHISTORY: Follow the Footsteps of Vali on YouTube
