= Grooved stone beater =

Type of stone tool

A grooved stone beater (Chinese: 有槽石棒; pinyin: yǒu-cáo-shí-bàng) is a kind of club-like stone tool with grooves. Sometimes it's called a bark beater or pottery-stamped stone tool. Some scholars think that such names with clear functional indications are not supported by archaeological evidence, and therefore they still call it grooved stone beater.

Grooved stone beaters are stone tools that were made of a rock completely polished and without sharp blades, usually with the used part and the handle part, and the used part can often be seen with grooves, which are either paralleled or intersected. They are found across Taiwan but primarily in eastern and northern region in small quantity, including Yuanshan Site, Talungtung Site, and Chihshanyan Site, Taipei; Chungleng Site and Henan Road Site, Taichung; Kuomushan Site and archaeological sites in Tainan Science Park, Tainan; Kenting Site, Pintung; Peinan Site, Tulan Site, Liyushan Site, and Tunghe Site, Taitung; and Hsincheng Site, Su'ao, Yilan. Only very small numbers were found at a single site.

Grooved stone beaters are mostly collected from the surface. Due to its insufficient number, the connection or contexts of these stone beaters with the archaeological cultures is not known. There are 26 stone beaters unearthed in Peinan Site, which contains most of the stone beaters found. The materials of these stone beaters include sandstones, siltstones, slates, mudstones, and shales. Usually, these materials are not durable when hitting in consecutive beats.

Through observations on these grooved stone beaters, only fragments of beater's heads are discovered, and the beaters were broken between the head part and the handle part, indicating that the head received most of the force. It can be roughly suspected that it's used to hit other objects. Records show that the Amis (Pangcah) people produce the bark cloth (tapa), but the beaters are mostly made of wood. Based on the ratio of the unearthed spindle whorl and the grooved stone beaters, Lien Chao-Mei suspected that the clothing of Peinan Site was primarily made of twining threads instead of bark cloth.
