= Stepped stone adze =

Prehistoric tool

A stepped stone adze is a tool for wood crafting or whittling. It is commonly found at Neolithic sites in Taiwan and mainland China, like the Zhejiang province with the Hemudu culture. The stone adzes are generally in a rectangle shape but look like a trapezoid from the side. The acute angle on the hypotenuse is the cutting edge of the stone adze; the surface stretching from the cutting edge is the “blade”. The stone adze can be categorized into different types based on their shapes, and the stepped stone adze is one of them. The “stepped” here means that the back of the adze is not a single flat surface but presents two successive levels of flat surfaces. It is particularly noticeable due to its unique appearance and cultural meaning.

== Functions ==
Currently, the stepped stone adzes found in Taiwan are mostly polished, and therefore they are fine-processed with high quality. The “stepped” back side of the adze is for being tied and fixed on a wooden handle with ropes, as well as for enhancing strength when swinging arms in order to increase work efficiency.

== Distribution ==
So far, stepped stone adzes were only found in a few sites, primarily in the north, including the Fengshan site in Taipei City, Tapenkeng site in New Taipei City, along with Chihwuyuan (Botanical Garden) site, Koutishan site, Tanti site, Tayuanchienshan site, and Chanlungshan site. They are found in the cultural layers of Tapenkeng Culture, Yuanshan Culture, and Botanical Garden Culture.

== Discussions on the Origin ==
The renowned archaeologist, Sung Wen-Hsun, had discussed the distribution of stone adzes in eastern Asia. It was discovered that the stone adzes were unearthed from the south of the Yangtze River in China all the way to Southeast Asia, among which the stepped stone adzes were mainly distributed in the north of the Jiangnan area. In addition, by comparing the appearances, the stone adzes in Mainland Southeast Asia seemed to be crafted in a “shouldered” shape instead of a “stepped” shape. However, going north to China and Taiwan, we only see “shouldered stone axes.” After comparing the distribution of the tools, Sung Wen-Hsun thinks that the Yuanshan Culture with the stepped stone adzes unearthed might be closely related to the coastal areas of Guangdong.

In recent years, there have also been scholars comparing the artifacts unearthed in northern Taiwan and the Tapenkeng site in the south, and they pointed out that there are stepped stone adzes in the north but not the shouldered stone axes, so it is likely related to the Hemudu Culture in China; the Nankuanli site in southern Taiwan has shouldered stone axes but no stepped stone adzes, indicating that it is related to the sites in Fujian and Guangdong.
