= Jade tube =

Archaeological jade treasure

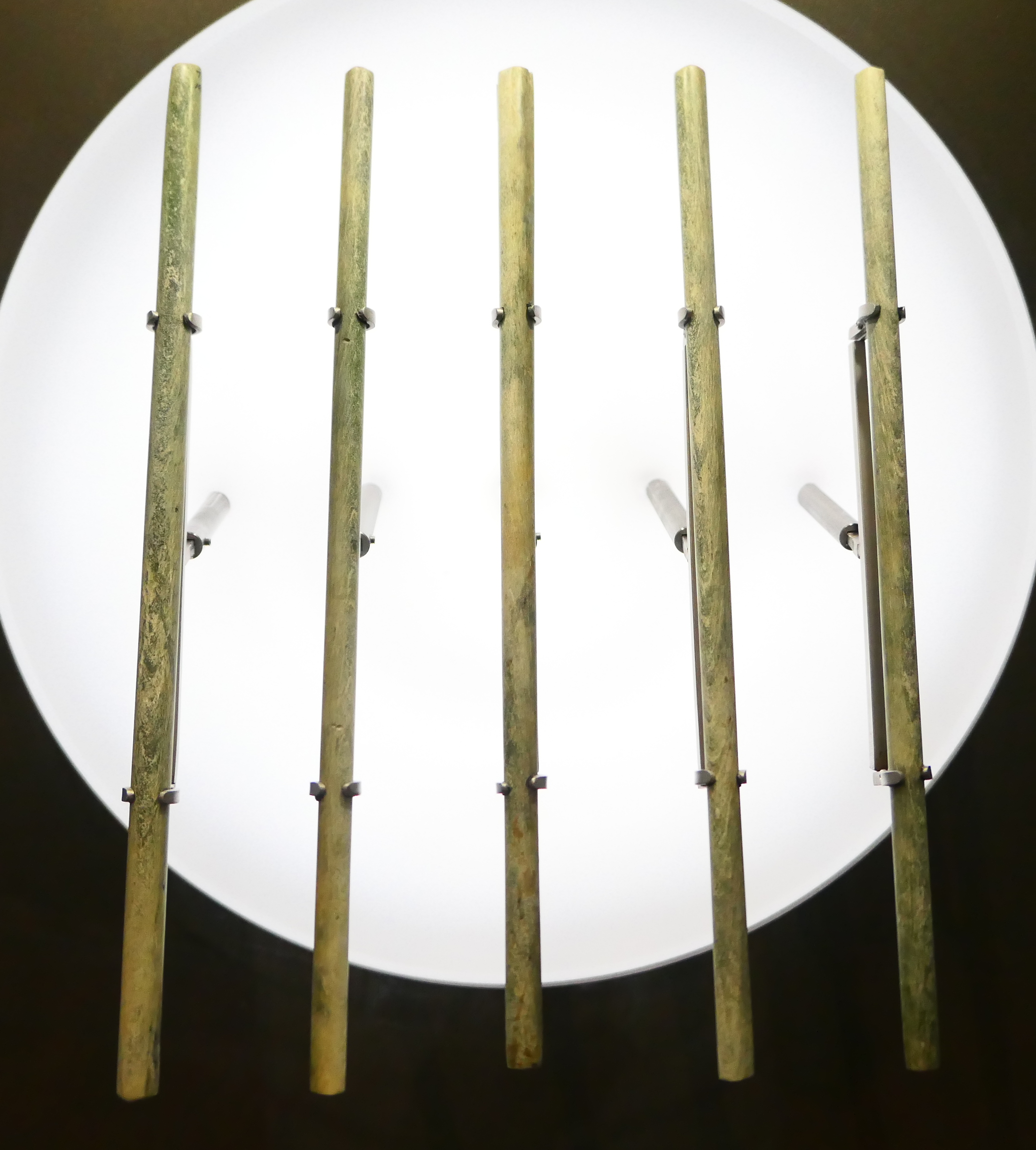
Jade Tubes (National Treasure) collected in National Museum of Prehistory, Taiwan.

Jade tube (Chinese: 玉管; pinyin: yù guǎn) is a tube-shaped jade ornament that was drilled from the two ends. It is a kind of pendant on necklaces and a characteristic jade ornament in the Peinan Site in eastern Taiwan. They can be divided into three categories depending on the tube diameters: large tubes, with diameters between 7 mm to 12 mm; medium tubes, between 2 mm and 6 mm; and small tubes or tube beads, below 2 mm. The tube body can be a rectangle, round, or shape between the two. Compared with the ones in other archaeological sites in eastern Taiwan, the ones unearthed in the Peinan Site are of the highest quantity, longest tube body, and largest size.

== Production ==
The bar jades are polished into round pillar shapes, and then they are drilled from the two ends. That is how the jade tubes were made. It is suspected that the drilling tools might be made of stone or metal, and there's no definite answer at this point. Some scholars believed that some medium or short tubes might be modified from the long tubes. As the long tubes were fragile, the fragments could be modified for re-use

== Functions ==
As the tubes are mostly found to be on the neck of the skeletons, researchers suspected that they were pendants stranded on a necklace as a burial item or some specific purposes. Scholars think that the long tubes over 20 cm are not suitable for wearing. Whether they are parts of a stranded ornament or have been symbolizing objects needs further discussion.

== Discussion of the origins ==
The jade tubes are made of nephrite, or so-called Fengtian Jade, and the place of origin is primarily at the Fengtian Laonao Mountain in Shoufeng Township, Hualien County. As there have been fewer jade wastes unearthed in the Peinan Site, most jade ornaments were said to be imported from other places and not produced by the local people

== Designated as a National Treasure ==
A set of five jade tubes, with the length of 29 cm, were unearthed in the Peinan Site and are now collected in the National Museum of Prehistory. They can be dated back to 2,800 to 2,300 years ago (2,800–2,300 B.P.; or 850–350 BC) and came from the slate coffins. The five tubes were in a bundle and placed by the tomb’s owner. This set of jade tubes is polished well and in the same specification. Compared with other jade ornaments of the same type unearthed in other archaeological sites in eastern Taiwan and nearby countries, this set of jade tubes is the longest one, displaying the masterfulness and world-class uniqueness of the jade craftsmanship in Neolithic Taiwan. It was designated as a national treasure by the Ministry of Culture in 2012.
