= Bell-shaped jade strung ornaments =

National treasure of Taiwan

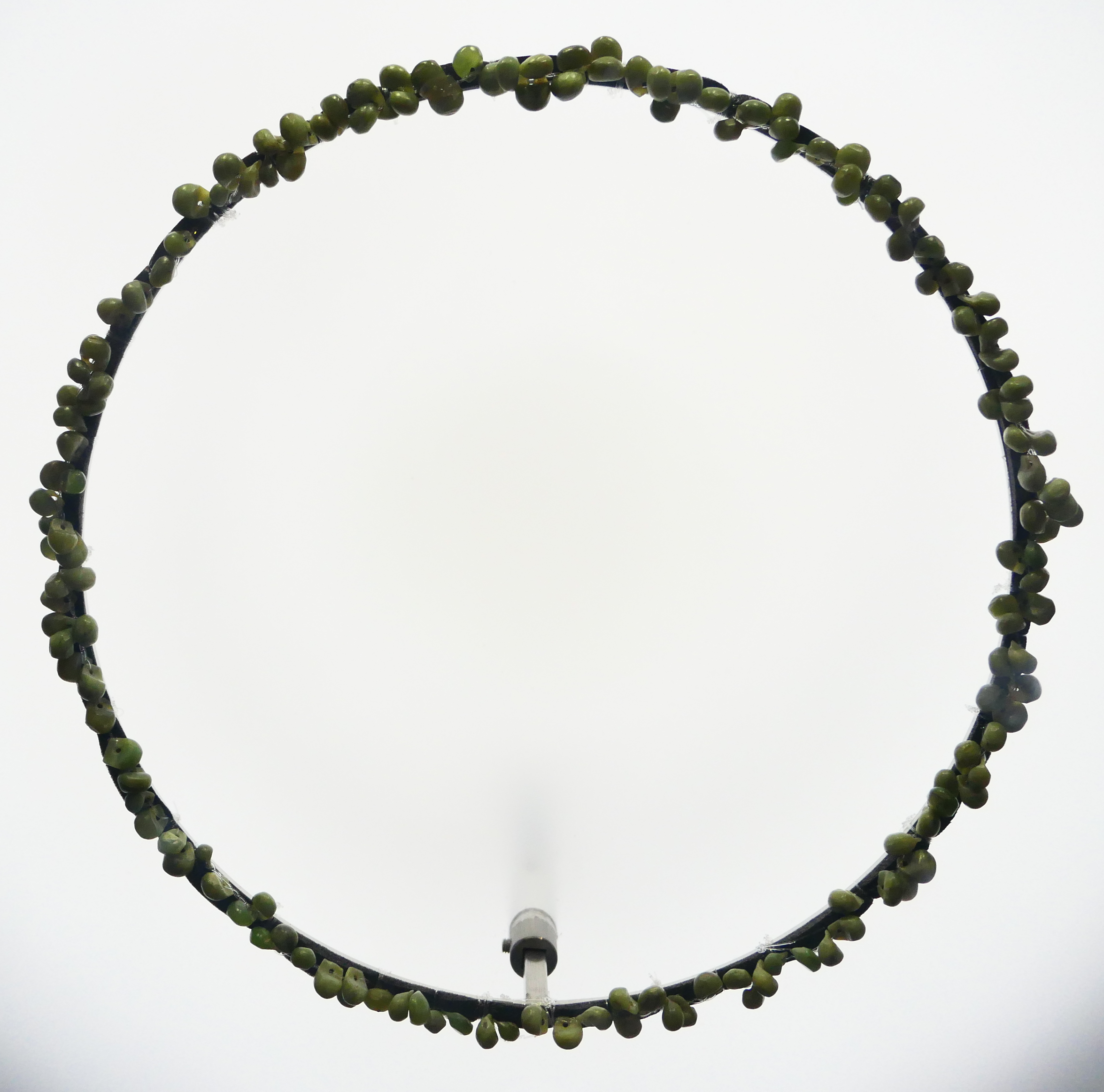
Bell-Shaped Jade Strung Ornaments (National Treasure) collected in National Museum of Prehistory, Taiwan.

Bell-shaped jade strung ornaments (Chinese: 鈴形玉串飾; pinyin: líng-xíng-yù-chuàn-shì) are ornaments made of bell-shaped jade beads made in Neolithic Taiwan. The bell-shaped jade beads are mostly made of nephrite. There are small holes on the beads that are presumably to string them. The jade beads are usually between 4 mm and 6 mm.

== Records of discovery ==
The earliest discovery of bell-shaped jade beads was at the Kenting archaeological site, Pingtung, followed by another discovery at the Peinan Site. A jade bead similar in shape was also unearthed in the Kay Daing site at the southwestern side of Luzon in 1997. After investigation, the texture was proved to be Taiwanese nephrite, which might reflect the interactions between these regions and cultures.

Scholars observed the excavation at Peinan Site and discovered that the bell-shaped jade strung ornaments are mostly found in the slate coffins of females. Based on their location on the skull, it is suspected that the beads were ornaments on the forehead or tied to headbands. Meanwhile, among over 1,500 slate coffins unearthed at the site, only 7 of them contain bell-shaped jade beads, signifying their rarity and uniqueness. Each jade bead is similar in shape and size, which is an obvious sign of demands for technique and quality. It’s possible that the owners held a special identity or rank.

== Production ==
To produce the ornaments, small pieces of columnar stone have a hole drilled in them, then the edges and corners are polished, then they are whittled into slices.

== Designated national treasure ==
One set of bell-shaped jade strung ornaments is designated as a Taiwanese national treasure and is stored in the National Museum of Prehistory. It consists of 152 individual jade beads that can be dated back to 4,000 to 3,500 years ago (B.P.; or 2,051-1,551 BC). They were unearthed in slate coffins at Peinan Site. They were found on the foreheads of the deceased, and it’s suspected that they served as ornaments on the head. Each bead is high quality and small in size, measuring 5 mm in each dimension. The holes are less than 1 mm.
