= Yingpu culture =

Prehistoric culture in Taiwan

Late Neolithic cultures in Taiwan.

The Yingpu Culture (Chinese: 營埔文化; pinyin: Yíngbù Wénhuà) was a late Neolithic (3500 BP - 2000 BP) culture centered on the central-west region of Taiwan. It was roughly distributed in the Taichung City, Changhua County and Nantou County, especially in the mid-down streams of the Choshui River, Tatu River, and Tachia River.

The type site is located at Yingpu Village of Dadu, Taichung, it was discovered in 1943 by Kokubu Naoichi (国分直一), a Japanese archaeologist. The excavations of this culture are also found in several other archaeological sites such as the Shuitiliao (水底寮), Tamalin (大馬璘), and Tapingting (大坪頂). The black and red potteries could be found in these sites.

== See also ==
- List of archaeological sites in Taiwan
- Prehistory of Taiwan
