= Metal Age =

Metal Age or The Metal Age may refer to:

- Metal Ages, the period of human civilization beginning about 6,000 years ago
  - Metal Age (Southeast Asia), a distinct period in Southeast Asia
- Ages of Man, the historical stages of human existence according to Greek mythology, indicated symbolically with metals
  - The Metallic Ages of Hesiod
- Thief II: The Metal Age, a video game developed by Looking Glass Studios

== See also ==
- Heavy metal music § History
