= Bird head-shaped object =

Archaeological artifact from Taiwan

Bird head-shaped object, also known as Bird's head shaped object or Bird head-shaped pottery (Chinese:鳥首狀器, 鳥頭狀器, 鳥頭形器; pinyin: niǎo shǒu zhuàng qì, niǎo tóu zhuàng qì, niǎo tóu xíng qì), is a unique pottery artifact found in the Niaosung culture in southwestern Taiwan, which dates to the Iron Age. Its body is like a canister, while the top looks like the beak of a bird. On its side from the top, there is a vertical groove extending all the way to the bottom. The bottom is flat and hollow. In addition, these objects have at least one hole on them, some on the top and others on the sides near the top. The name derives from its special beak-like design.

== Origin and related groups ==
Archaeological evidence indicates that the objects have existed from the Iron Age to the Siraya culture in the modern indigenous period. There were mentions of similar objects in earlier literature. The Notes of Anping Prefecture (安平縣雜記) completed in the late period when Taiwan was under Japanese rule, have recorded the scenes that the Tawulung tribe set up the ancestral shrine (Siraya: Kuba, Taivuan: Kuwa):

"People from each tribe and village must set up a shrine built with bamboo, with thatches on the top. Water outlets are to be installed on the front and back parts of the shrine. There should be a spine in the middle of the shrine, with three fake birds made of clay on both sides. The birds' bodies shall be adhered with bamboo, with their beaks picking the straws (whose name is "A'an", according to the investigation)."

As such, scholars assumed that the fake birds here were made of fired clay. Thereafter, the Siraya people might have lost the technique of making pottery due to Sinicization and adopted woodcarving instead.

== Functions ==
Besides the fake birds "A'an", these bird head-shaped objects might have been religious symbols. Some say that they were used as musical instruments (bells) according to the features: the long body as a resonance chamber; the grooves on the side as a sound outlet; and the horizontal holes or the holes penetrating the top can be used to tie with ropes for carrying or binding purposes. The vertical holes penetrating the whole body can be tied with tinkle bells to produce sounds. Others say that they were used for tailoring or fishing. The holes on the objects can be tied with ropes and used as spindles or net sinkers. Nevertheless, their functions still remain unclear, which needs more study.
