= Niaosung culture =

Metal Age culture in Taiwan

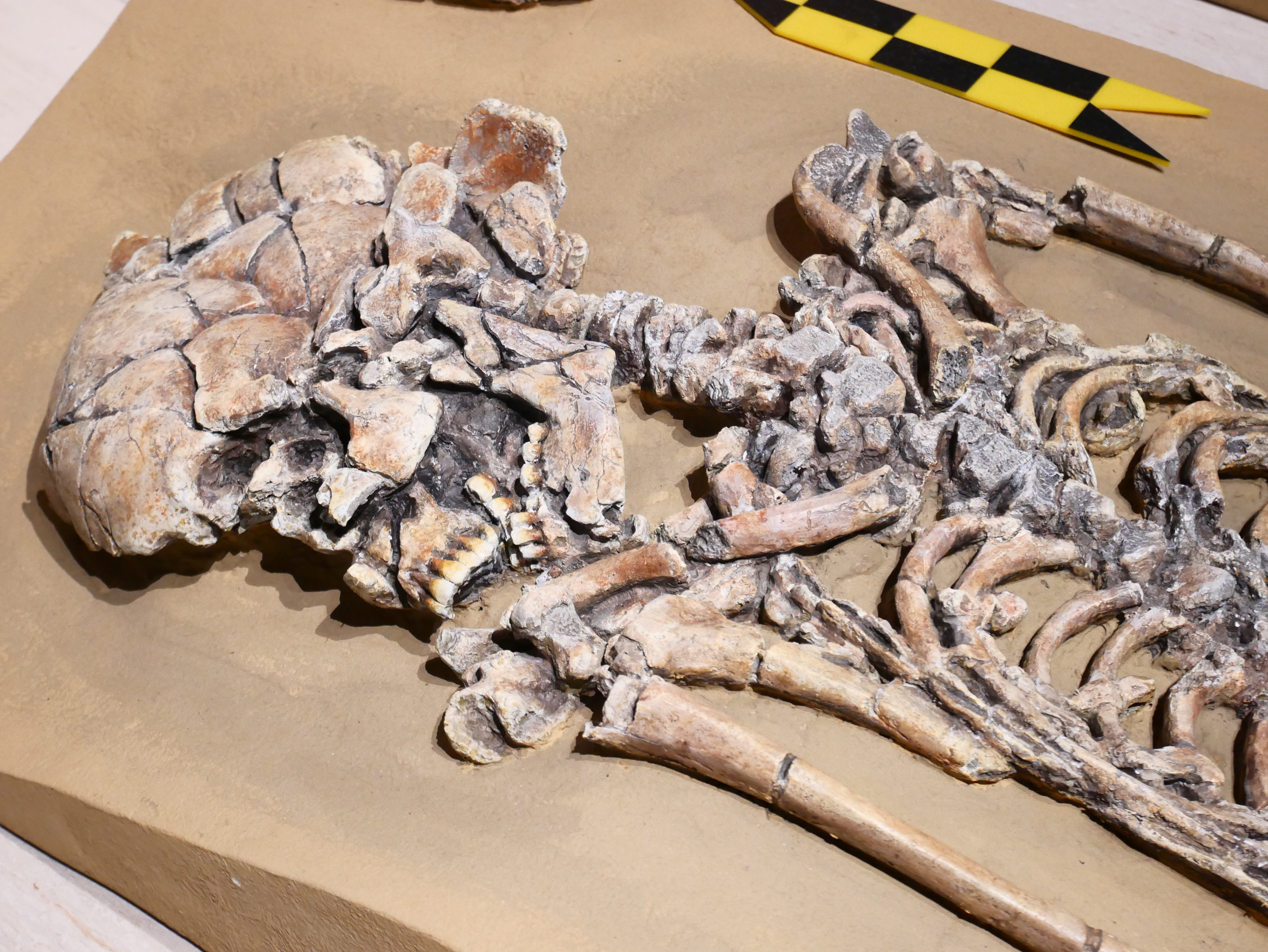
Reclining extended burial of the Niaosong Culture (Qigandidi East Site), Zhongyan Village (Jiuzhuang), Zhongyan Sub-district, Nangang District, Taipei City

The Niaosung culture (Chinese: 蔦松文化; pinyin: Niǎosōng Wénhuà) was an archaeological culture in the south of the island of Taiwan. It was distributed around the region of Tainan and Kaohsiung. The culture existed in the Metal Age of the island of Taiwan. Some evidence suggests the Niaosung culture is directly connected to the Siraya people, one of the Taiwanese indigenous peoples still living in the area.

There is a set of several archaeological sites formed the culture, such as Niaosung (蔦松遺址), Futingchin (覆頂金遺址), Hsiliao (西寮遺址) and Kanhsi (看西遺址). Some were discovered in the archaeological research excavations, and some in other works such as digging fish farms or building factories. These sites had been excavated out potteries or middens.

The Niaosung culture created Bird head-shaped objects.

== See also ==
- Tahu culture
- List of archaeological sites in Taiwan
- Prehistory of Taiwan
