= Fushan =

Fushan may refer to:

- Fushan, Chengmai County (福山镇), a town in Hainan, China
- Fushan County (浮山县), of Linfen, Shanxi, China
- Fushan District (福山区), Yantai, Shandong, China
- Fushan, Ningyang County (伏山镇), a town in Ningyang County, Shandong, China
- Fushan, Weifang (符山镇), a town in Weicheng District, Weifang, Shandong, China
- Fushan, Iran, a village in Razavi Khorasan Province, Iran
- Fushan (archaeological site) (富山考古遺址), archaeological site in Taitung County, Taiwan
- The Chinese name of Busan (釜山市), a major city in South Korea
