= Metal Age (Southeast Asia) =

Period between 1 and 1500 CE in Maritime Southeast Asia

In the archaeology of Maritime Southeast Asia, the Metal Age is the period between roughly 2000 and 500 years ago. The internal chronology of the period is still debated, but it is often divided into 'early', 'developed' and 'proto-historic' phases. Unlike in the conventional three-age system used in other parts of Eurasia, archaeologists do not divide the Metal Age into a Bronze Age and Iron Age, because bronze and iron metallurgy arrived in Maritime Southeast Asia at roughly the same time.

== See also ==
- Dong Son culture
- History of Brunei
- Prehistoric Indonesia
- Prehistoric Malaysia
- Prehistory of the Philippines
- Early history of Singapore
- Pre-colonial Timor
- Prehistory of Taiwan
