= Dapenkeng culture =

Neolithic culture in Taiwan

- Geographical range: coastal Taiwan and Penghu
- Period: early Neolithic
- Dates: c. 3500 – c. 2500 BC
- Preceded by: Changbin culture
- Followed by: local cultures

The Dapenkeng culture (Chinese: 大坌坑文化; pinyin: Dàbènkēng wénhuà) was an early Neolithic culture that appeared in northern Taiwan between 4000 and 3000 BC and quickly spread around the coast of the island, as well as the Penghu islands to the west. Most scholars believe this culture was brought across the Taiwan Strait by the ancestors of today's Taiwanese aborigines, speaking early Austronesian languages. No ancestral culture on the mainland has been identified, but a number of shared features suggest ongoing contacts.

== Characteristics ==
The type site in Bali District, New Taipei City in northwest Taiwan, was discovered in 1958. Other major sites excavated before 1980 are the lowest layer of the Fengbitou Archaeological Site in Linyuan District, Kaohsiung and Bajiacun in Gueiren District, Tainan, both in the southwest of the island. Dapenkeng sites have since been found in coastal areas all around the island, and on the Penghu islands in the Taiwan Strait.

Dapenkeng pottery is thick and gritty, and light to dark brown in colour. The main types are large globular jars and bowls. The outsides of the jars are covered with impressed cord marks, except for the flared rims, which are decorated with incised linear designs. Dapenkeng sites have also yielded a number of types of stone tools:

- Pecked pebbles, up to 20 cm across, were probably used as net sinkers.
- Bark beaters were found at two sites.
- Adzes were highly polished, with a rectangular cross section. Shouldered adzes made of basalt appear later in the period, and are believed to come from a workshop on Penghu.
- Many thin, flat, triangular points of green slate were found, each with a hole drilled through the centre.

Reaping knives made from oyster shells and some tools and ornaments made from bones and antlers have also been found. The inhabitants engaged in horticulture and hunting, but were also heavily reliant on marine shells and fish. Later in the period they cultivated foxtail millet and rice.

Around 2500 BC, the Dapenkeng culture developed into locally differentiated cultures throughout Taiwan. Because of the continuity with later cultures, most scholars believe that the Dapenkeng people were the ancestors of today's Taiwanese aborigines, and spoke Austronesian languages.

== Proposed mainland antecedents ==
Archaeological sites on Taiwan and the Fujian coast

Taiwan was first settled by Paleolithic people, who reached the island during the Late Pleistocene glaciation, when sea levels were lower and the Taiwan Strait was a land bridge. Although the Paleolithic Changbin culture overlaps with the earliest Dapenkeng sites, archeologists have found no evidence of evolutionary development, and assume that the Dapenkeng culture must have arrived from elsewhere. The most likely candidate is the coast of what is now Fujian on the other side of the Taiwan Strait, which is 130 km wide at its narrowest point. However, archaeological data from that area is quite limited. Three principal sites from the early Neolithic have been excavated:

- The Keqiutou site on Haitan Island was partially destroyed by later activity, but has been excavated by Fujian archaeologists. It features worked pebbles, polished adzes and points similar to those of Dapenkeng sites. The decoration of the pottery is more varied.
- The Fuguodun site on Kinmen was found by a geologist, and excavated in an ad hoc manner. Some of the pottery is decorated with cord-marking, but stamping with shells is more common.
- The Jinguishan site on Kinmen features similar pottery to Fuguodun, but without cord-marking.

K.C. Chang argued that Fuguodun and Dapenkeng were regional variants of the same culture. Other scholars consider them distinct cultures, pointing to differences in pottery styles.

These coastal mainland cultures seem to have appeared abruptly without local precursors, and their origins are unclear. Chang and Ward Goodenough argue that these cultures reflect the influence of the Hemudu and Majiabang cultures of the lower Yangtze area, though they are unsure whether this was the result of migration or trade. Peter Bellwood agrees that the Austronesian cultural package came from this area, but confirming archaeological evidence has not yet been found. The Dapenkeng culture may have received influence from the Yangtze Delta's Liangzhu culture c. 3000 to c. 2000 BC, when a nephrite-trading sphere emerged in Taiwan, sharing commonalities with the Liangzhu culture's highly-developed preference for jade artefacts. The Liangzhu culture may have also influenced the development of the stepped stone adze in the Dapenkeng culture.

The Dapenkeng culture also shared numerous specific cultural commonalities with the Xiantouling-Tawan culture and the succeeding Baojingwan culture of the Pearl River Delta, with the period of cultural interaction taking place c. 2200 to c. 2000 BC. Xiantouling-Tawan's round-buttomed pots and jars, ring-footed jars, mugs, dou stem-cups, and plates, and pedestals bear close resemblance to Dapenkeng pottery, with the red pottery with geometric lines from the Anhe site at Taichung being an example of artifacts with great similarity to Tawan pottery.

Roger Blench (2014), building upon the earlier arguments of Ferrell (1969), suggests that the single migration model for the spread of the Neolithic into Taiwan is problematic, pointing out the genetic and linguistic inconsistencies between different Taiwanese Austronesian groups, and the great divergence of archaeological cultures from 4000 BP onwards. Blench considers the Austronesians in Taiwan to have been a melting pot involving a continuous flow of migrants from various parts of the coast of East China that had been migrating to Taiwan from 5500 to 4000 BP. After the fishing-based Dapenkeng culture of coastal Fujian, other immigrant waves included people from the foxtail millet-cultivating Longshan culture of Shandong (forming the Dahu culture of southern Taiwan in 3800 BP), and the Yuanshan culture of northernmost Taiwan appearing at 4500 BP, which Blench suggests may have originated from the coast of Guangdong. Based on geography and cultural vocabulary, Blench believes that the Yuanshan people may have spoken Northeast Formosan languages. Thus, Blench believes that there is in fact no "apical" Formosan ancestor of Austronesian in the sense that there was no single Proto-Austronesian language in Taiwan that gave rise to all present-day Formosan languages. Instead, multiple migrations of various pre-Austronesian peoples from mainland China, speaking related but quite diverse languages, came into contact in Taiwan. There, due to the spread of agriculture, linguistic levelling took place, creating the appearance of branching from a single language. In this view, it is unclear what language the Dapenkeng culture spoke or if any Formosan language is its direct descendant.
