= Tahu culture =

Late Neolithic culture in Taiwan

Late Neolithic cultures in Taiwan.

The Tahu culture (Chinese: 大湖文化; pinyin: Dàhú Wénhuà) was an archaeological culture in southern Taiwan. It distributed around the Tainan-Kaohsiung region. The culture was one of the late Neolithic cultures of Taiwan island. A set of several archaeological sites formed the culture, such as the Tahu Site (大湖遺址), Fengpitou Site (鳳鼻頭遺址) and Wushantou Site (烏山頭遺址). These sites had been excavated out many bone tools, potteries or middens.

Roger Blench considers the Austronesians in Taiwan to have been a melting pot involving a continuous flow of migrants from various parts of the coast of East China that had been migrating to Taiwan from 5500 to 4000 BP. After the fishing-based Dapenkeng culture of coastal Fujian, other immigrant waves included the Yuanshan culture ca. 4500 BP, and people from the foxtail millet-cultivating Longshan culture of Shandong (forming the Tahu culture of southern Taiwan ca. 3800 BP). K. C. Chang, Minze Stuiver, and subsequent scholars note that the Tahu culture's preference for millet cultivation and practice of dental evulsion strongly supports the theory of a Longshan connection. Blench argues that the appearance of this Longshan-like culture at this time was the result of lowering sea levels in this period, which opened up plains on the western coast of Taiwan for agriculture.

The Dàhú is associated with tooth ablation specifically in women; it was population-wide in early Neolithic Taiwan.

During the late Neolithic period, more plentiful skeletal remains were preserved throughout the island, revealing a widespread trend for 2I2C1ablation and a declining tendency among males. This trend was especially notable in the southern region, where the localized Dahu Culture began around 3300 BP. Additionally at this time, several aspects of customs in this region changed, such as burial head orientation and position, collectively suggesting cultural transformation.

== See also ==
- Niaosung culture
- List of archaeological sites in Taiwan
- Prehistory of Taiwan
