= Fukuyama =

Fukuyama may refer to:

== People ==
- Fukuyama (surname), other people with the name
  - Francis Fukuyama, Japanese-American philosopher and political economist

== Places ==
- Fukuyama, Hiroshima, city in Hiroshima Prefecture, Japan
- Fukuyama, Kagoshima, former town in Japan, now part of Kirishima city

== Other uses ==
- Fukuyama congenital muscular dystrophy (FCMD)
