= Zuojhen Man =

Prehistoric human fossil from Taiwan

Zuojhen Man is a human fossil discovered in Tsai-Liao Creek (Chinese: 菜寮溪) in Zuojhen District, Tainan City. (Note: When the fossils were discovered, it was Zuojhen Township of Tainan County by the administrative division at that time.) The fossil was once determined to be approximately 20,000 to 30,000 years old, earning it the title of being "Taiwan's most ancient man". In a reexamination in 2015, the fossil was determined to be from the late Neolithic period, 3,000 years ago.

== Excavations and research ==
The first piece of Zuojhen Man's fossil was discovered in August 1970 by amateur fossil collectors Guo Deling (Chinese: 郭德鈴) (Note: Then an assistant manager at First Bank.) and his son Guo Donghui (Chinese: 郭東輝) (Note: Then a first-year student at Tainan First Senior High School.) from Tainan City. When the father and son were collecting fossils in Tsai-Liao Creek of the then Zuojhen Township, Tainan County, Guo Donghui found a piece of skull fossil on the riverbed southwest of the village Sanchong Creek (Chinese: 三重溪). The two of them were unable to confirm whether it belonged to a man or an ape, so they kept it.

On November 19, 1971, amateur fossil collector Pan Changwu and others discovered intact fossil pieces of the rhinoceros species Nesorhinus hayasakai, and Guo Deling discovered fossils of the deer Elaphurus formosanus. These discoveries brought attention from the Taiwan Provincial Museum (now National Taiwan Museum) and National Taiwan University. As a result, Professor Song Wenxun (Chinese: 宋文薰) (from National Taiwan University's Department of Archaeology and Anthropology) and Professor Lin Chaoqi (Chinese: 林朝棨) (from the Department of Geology), accompanied by Taiwan Provincial Museum's Curator Liu Yen (Chinese: 劉衍), Director Jin Liangchen (Chinese: 金良晨), He Xunyao (Chinese: 何勛堯) and others, traveled south for prospecting in late December. They observed Guo Deling's fossil collection afterward, which included the skull fragment discovered in 1970. After Guo Deling showed the fragment to Song Wenxun and Lin Chaoqi, they brought it back to National Taiwan University for research.

In 1972, in order to dig up the fossil of a whole rhinoceros, Taiwan Provincial Museum hired Japanese scholars Shikama Tokio (Japanese: 鹿間時夫) (Note: Then a professor at Yokohama National University and president of the Palaeontological Society of Japan.) and Ootsuka Hiroyuki (Japanese: 大塚裕之) (Note: Then an assistant professor at Kagoshima University.) to come to Taiwan and help. Later in August 1973, Lin Chaoqi asked the Japanese scholars to take the skull fragment back to Japan for identification. In January 1974, Pan Changwu gave another piece of skull fossil he had discovered to Shikama Tokio for identification in Japan. Later the same year, Pan donated still another piece of skull fossil to Taiwan Provincial Museum.

The fossils were preliminarily judged by Japanese scholars as human. After undergoing fluorine and manganese measurements, it was determined that the fragments' absolute age was approximately 20,000 to 30,000 years. As the three human skull pieces were all discovered in Tsai-Liao Creek of Zuojhen Township, Tainan County, scholars named the species "Zuojhen Man". During the period, another amateur fossil collector, "Fossil Grandpa" Chen Chunmu (Chinese: 陳春木), found another four pieces of skull fossil in Kong-a-nah (Chinese: 崗仔林). In 1976, a report on these pieces was formally published on the Journal of the Anthropological Society of Nippon (《日本人類學會期刊》). In 1977, Pan Changwu provided National Taiwan University with a human tooth fossil, and the next year Chen Chunmu mailed another human tooth fossil collected by Chen Jitang (陳濟堂). Later, the university's Professor Lian Chaomei conducted research on them.

In 2014, the National Taiwan Museum initiated a "Re-research on Zuojhen Man" project, and the project team sent specimen samples of the Zuojhen skull fossils to a lab in the United States for examination. Results of carbon-14 dating showed one of the skull fossil specimens (AH006672) was approximately 3,000 years old, while another specimen (AH006674) was 250 years old. The project team took another sample from the same specimen (AH006672) and sent it to the Australian National University for examination in the same year without sharing their results. The new result obtained was similar to the initial examination, in that the age of specimen AH006672 was dated as approximately 3,000 years.

== Culture ==
As there were only fossils and no archaeological ruins or cultural relics (Note: The pottery and stoneware discovered on the riverbed of Tsai-Liao Creek were made after the Neolithic Era, which is a different time from the Zuojhen Man.) discovered with regard to Zuojhen Man, it could only be confirmed as having existed. It was speculated to be from either the Changbin culture (Chinese: 長濱文化) or Wangxing culture (Chinese: 網型文化), two late Paleolithic groups, but studies in 2015 negated the possibility that Zuojhen Man lived in the Paleolithic Era, so its culture is currently unclear.
