= List of archaeological sites in Taiwan =

Many archaeological sites in Taiwan either have contributed substantially or have the potential to contribute substantially to research regarding people who have lived there since prehistoric times. A historical site is not necessarily an archaeological site. A historical site should be included only if actual field work has been conducted at the site.

== Northern Taiwan ==
=== Metropolitan Taipei ===
- Botanical Garden Site (植物園遺址)
- Chihshan Rock Site (芝山岩遺址)
- Shihsanhang Site (十三行遺址)
- Tapenkeng Site (大坌坑遺址)
- Yuanshan Site (圓山遺址)

== Central Taiwan ==
=== Taichung ===
- Fanchi Garden Site (番仔園遺址)
- Huilai Monument Archaeology Park
- Niumatou Site

=== Nantou ===
- Chuping Archaeological Site

== Southern Taiwan ==
=== Kaohsiung ===
- Fengbitou Archaeological Site
- Futingchin Site (覆鼎金遺址)
- Hoching Site (後勁遺址)
- Hochuang Site (後庄遺址)
- Liuho Site (六和遺址)
- Lungchuan Temple Site (龍泉寺遺址)
- Tsoying Old City Site (左營舊城遺址)

=== Tainan ===
- Niaosung Culture Site
- 歸仁窯遺址
- 南科遺址
- 西寮遺址
- 道爺南糖廍遺址

== Eastern Taiwan ==
=== Taitung ===
- 八仙洞遺址
- Donghe Site (東河遺址)
- Beinan Site
- Dulan Site

=== Yilan ===
- 宜蘭農校遺址
- 淇武蘭遺址
- 大竹圍遺址
- Wanshan Site (丸山遺址)

== Outlying islands ==
=== Kinmen ===
- Chinkuishan Site 金龜山遺址
