= Pre-colonial Timor =

History and pre-history of the island Timor, prior to 1600s European colonisation

Timor is an island in Southeast Asia. Geologically considered a continental crustal fragment, it lies alongside the Sunda shelf, and is the largest in a cluster of islands between Java and New Guinea. European colonialism has shaped Timorese history since 1515, a period when it was divided between the Dutch in the west of the island (now Indonesian West Timor) and the Portuguese in the east (now the independent state of East Timor).

== Early history ==
The island of Timor was populated as part of the human migrations that shaped Australasia more generally. It is believed that survivors from three waves of migration still live in the country. The first is described by anthropologists as "Australo-Melanesian" people who arrived from Southeast Asia Mainland least 42,000 years ago. In 2011, archeologists from Australian National University uncovered evidences from Jerimalai cave show that these early settlers had high-level maritime skills at this time, and by implication the technology needed to make ocean crossings to reach Australia and other islands, as they were catching and consuming large numbers of big deep sea fish such as tuna. These excavations also discovered one of the world's earliest recorded fish hooks, between 16,000 and 23,000 years old.

Around 3000 BC, a second wave of migration brought Austronesians people, who likely trace their origin to Taiwan. These new immigrants introduced Austronesian languages and agriculture to the island, while earlier pre-Austronesian population gradually merged with these newcomers. Timorese origin myths tell of ancestors that sailed around the eastern end of Timor arriving on land in the south. Some folklores accounted Timorese ancestors journeying from the Malay Peninsula or the Minangkabau Highlands of Sumatra.

== The Timorese in their region ==
The later Timorese were not seafarers, rather they were land focused peoples who did not make contact with other islands and peoples by sea. Timor was part of a region of small islands with small populations of similarly land-focused peoples that now make up eastern Indonesia. Contact with the outside world was via networks of foreign seafaring traders from as far as China and India that served the archipelago. Outside products brought to the region included metal goods, rice, fine textiles, and coins exchanged for local spices, sandalwood, deer horn, bees' wax, and slaves.

=== Indianized Hindu-Buddhist kingdoms (3rd century – 16th century) ===
Historic Indosphere cultural influence zone of Greater India for transmission of elements of Indian elements such as the honorific titles, naming of people, naming of places, mottos of organisations and educational institutes as well as adoption of Hinduism, Buddhism, Indian architecture, martial arts, Indian music and dance, traditional Indian clothing, and Indian cuisine, a process which has also been aided by the ongoing historic expansion of Indian diaspora. Timor is outside but close to this sphere.

==== Indianized Javanese Hindu-Buddhist Srivijaya empire (7th – 12th century) ====
Oral traditions of people of the Wehali principality of East Timor mention their migration from Sina Mutin Malaka or "Chinese White Malacca" (part of the Indianized Hindu-Buddhist Srivijaya Empire) in ancient times.

==== Relations with Indianized Javanese Hindu empire of Majapahit (12th – 16th century) ====
The Majapahit Empire's Nagarakretagama chronicles called Timor a tributary, but as Portuguese chronologist Tomé Pires wrote in the sixteenth century, all islands east of Java were called "Timor". Indonesian nationalist used the Majapahit chronicles to claim East Timor as part of Indonesia.

===== Chiefdoms or polities =====
Early European explorers report that the island had a number of small chiefdoms or princedoms in the early 16th century. One of the most significant is the Wehali or Wehale Kingdom in central Timor, to which the Tetum, Bunak, and Kemak ethnic groups were aligned.

The account of Antonio Pigafetta of the Magellan expedition, who visited Timor in 1522, confirms the importance of the Wewiku-Wehali Kingdom. In the seventeenth century the ruler of Wehali was described as "an emperor, whom all the kings on the island adhere to with tribute, as being their sovereign". He entertained friendly contacts with the Muslim kingdom of Makassar, but his power was checked by devastating invasions by the Portuguese in 1642 and 1665. Wehali was now brought inside the Portuguese sphere of power but appears to have had limited contact with its colonial suzerain.

===== Trade with China =====
Timor is mentioned in the 13th-century Chinese Zhu Fan Zhi, where it is called Ti-wu and is noted for its sandalwood. It is called Ti-men in the History of Song of 1345. Writing toward 1350, Wang Dayuan refers to a Ku-li Ti-men, which is a corruption of Giri Timor, meaning island of Timor. Giri from "mountain" in Sanskrit, thus "mountainous island of Timor".

===== Trade with the Philippines =====
Filipinos, known as Luções among Portuguese sailors, were recorded to have visited and settled in East Timor before Spanish colonisation of the Philippines. The Magellan expedition recorded that when they anchored on the island, they witnessed Luções merchants who traded Philippine gold for East Timorese sandalwood.

=== European colonisation and Christianisation (16th century onward) ===
Beginning in the early 16th century, European colonialists—the Dutch in the island's west, and Portuguese in the east—would divide the island, isolating the East Timorese from the histories of the surrounding archipelago.

== See also ==
- History of East Timor
- History of Indonesia
