= Egg-beater =

Egg-beater, egg beater, or eggbeater may refer to:

- Mixer (appliance), an electric kitchen appliance often referred to as an "egg-beater"
  - Eggbeater (mixer), a hand-cranked tool for beating eggs, as for omelettes or cake-baking
- Egg Beaters, an egg white–based ingredient used in cooking or baking
- Eggbeater wind turbine, a wind turbine design
- Eggbeater drill, a type of hand drill with bevel gears, analogous in form to an eggbeater for the kitchen
- Eggbeater kick, a swimming manoeuver
- Eggbeater pedal, a model of clipless pedals for bicycles
