= Fukuyama (surname) =

Fukuyama (written: 福山) is a Japanese surname. Notable people with the surname include:

- Francis Fukuyama, Japanese-American philosopher and political economist
- Jun Fukuyama, Japanese voice actor
- Masaharu Fukuyama, Japanese singer-songwriter
- Taichi Fukuyama (福山 汰一, born 1993), Japanese volleyball player
- Tohru Fukuyama, Japanese chemist
- Yoshiki Fukuyama, Japanese guitarist
