= Cultural layer =

Archeological concept

Cultural layer is a key concept in archaeology, particularly culture-historical archaeology especially in archaeological digs or excavations. A cultural layer helps determine an archaeological culture: the remnants of human settlement that can be grouped and identified as coming from approximately the same distinct time period.

A cultural layer is the evidence created by humans at a place of their settlement over a distinct period of time, along with the contribution of various natural processes. A cultural layer might include remnants of housing structures and farming, tools, ceramics, or other indicators of ritual. The 'layer' term refers to their places usually under the earth, often buried by centuries or millennia of sediment, and discovered during excavations.

It can be defined as a holistic natural-historical body (formation) represented by artificial material remains such as artefacts and organo-mineral substance (filling material) having a dual natural-anthropogenic origin.

Cultural layer in an archaeological dig is the substantial holder and keeper of the information on the history of human activities, interactions and mutual influence of nature and a society. From this point of view Cultural Layer acts as a basic element of the anthroposphere. Due to joint efforts of archaeologists and geologists, the most investigated are the Cultural Layer of the late Paleolithic sites. The interdisciplinary science of geoarcheology appeared. Holocene Cultural Layer are under the active investigation of the geographers and soil scientists.

Hydroarcheology, pedoarcheology and archeologic geomorphology also develop actively. Various paleoecological reconstructions can be presented on a base of the properties of Cultural Layer, character of their interactions with soils and lithological layers. There is a large variety of Cultural Layer - from weak traces in geological material disturbed by humans or weakly changed soil up to the thick anthropogenic layers, transforming the micro- and mesoforms or creating new forms of relief. The thickest Cultural Layer of the long-term settlements (tells, villages) includes soil horizons or profiles, which indicate the restoration of the natural soil-forming process. Cultural Layer of the settlements in forest-steppe, steppe and especially subtropical zones become considerably complicated since Eneolith and Bronze Age comparing with earlier Cultural Layer. The processes of social and economic differentiation sharply increase in different landscapes at that time together with the related processes of settling. A variety of settlements and engineering constructions appear at that time: short- and long-term settlements, breeding centers, fortification and sacral monuments.

As a result, Cultural Layer became very different in properties and spatially variable. Settlements are allocated to different water sources. Ancient civilizations were tightly linked to river valleys, and ancient settlements occurred on high floodplains, terraces, and valley slopes. Later, they appeared on interfluves. They were also common on coasts of lakes and rivers. Shifts in the position of coastlines led to shifts in the position of settlements. Catastrophic floods could completely destroy ancient settlements, so that only their Cultural Layers were preserved. Cultural Layers are surface formations. They may be included in the profile of fully developed soils replacing some of the soil horizons; they may be altered by the subsequent soil formation with the creation of the new horizonation of the profile.
