= Bark beater =

Tool to make barkcloth

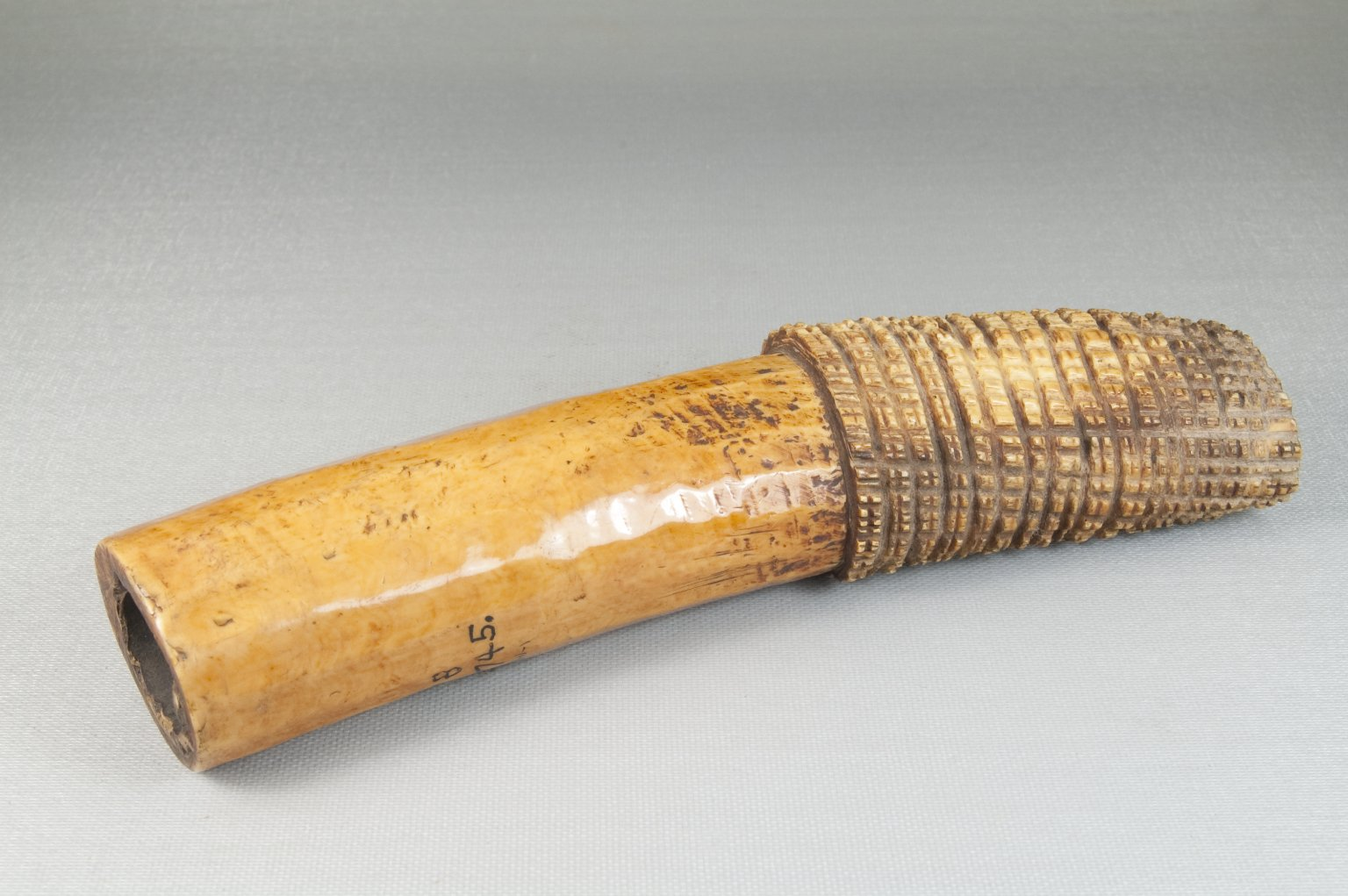
Red ivory bark beater, from before 1922, Brooklyn museum

In many traditional cultures, bark beaters were tools used to pound tree bark, to make the bark softer for the processing of barkcloth, which is used for making paper, and clothing. This tool has many different variations that are seen in indigenous cultures worldwide, yet all for a similar purpose.

== History ==
“In Mesoamerica, the earliest proven bark beaters are from the Maya area and its periphery, particularly the Pacific coastal plain of Guatemala and El Salvador, where they appear some 2,500 years ago.” Both forms of bark beaters (club-shaped, and racquet type) were also found in the islands of Southeast Asia. These date back to several hundred years earlier than those in Mesoamerica, but the dating there is less secure as those islands were some of the last on Earth to be settled. Another reason it is so difficult to determine when bark beaters first began to be used to make bark cloth is because bark is biodegradable, and does not last long – especially in hot, tropical climates. Many bark processing tools were also made out of wood, making it difficult to determine for the same reasons.

== Composition and use ==
They vary in size, shapes, and materials. Some of the materials include limestone, wood, ground stone, and certain sea shells (i.e. scallop shells). They are carved with parallel striations. Some bark beaters have long handles, while others have an encircling groove around the side for hafting so it fits easily in one's hand "I have recorded some 140 uses of the product, such as mats, blankets, bags, various items of clothing, shrouds, banners, and of course, writing paper.” Says Professor Paul Tolstoy of Montreal, Canada. The Maya used bark paper not only to write on, but also for ceremonial clothing, fans, and many others. Early records show that the Aztec city in Mexico, Tenochtitlan, they used to produce 42,000 packets of paper annually to be paid in tributes.

== Process ==
There has been approximately 300 variable features determined in the steps that go into producing barkcloth. They include such elements as the cultivation or care of trees used for their bark; ways of getting at the desired bast layer.

Barkcloth, or paper is a layer of inner bark taken from a tree (mostly of the fig family). Once taken, the bark beater is used to widen, thin, and make the cloth flexible. Sometimes the bark beater is used in combination of other techniques, such as soaking the cloth in water.
