= Prehistory of Taiwan =

Most information about Taiwan before the arrival of the Dutch East India Company in 1624 comes from archaeological finds throughout the island. The earliest evidence of human habitation dates to around 30,000 years ago, when lower sea levels exposed the Taiwan Strait as a land bridge. Around 5,000 years ago, farmers from what is now the southeast coast of China settled on the island. These people are believed to have been speakers of Austronesian languages, which dispersed from Taiwan across the islands of the Pacific and Indian Oceans. The current Taiwanese aborigines are believed to be their descendants.

== Geographical context ==
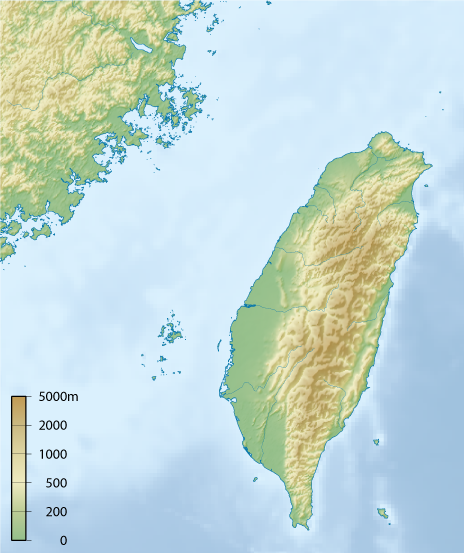
Taiwan is separated from southeast China by the shallow Taiwan Strait.

The island of Taiwan was formed approximately 4 to 5 million years ago on a complex convergent boundary between the continental Eurasian Plate and the oceanic Philippine Sea Plate. The boundary continues southwards in the Luzon Volcanic Arc, a chain of islands between Taiwan and the Philippine island of Luzon including Green Island and Orchid Island. From the northern part of the island the eastward continuation of the boundary is marked by the Ryukyu chain of volcanic islands.

The island is separated from the coast of Fujian to the west by the Taiwan Strait, which is 130 km (81 mi) wide at its narrowest point. The most significant islands in the Strait are the Penghu islands 45 km (28 mi) from the southwest coast of Taiwan and 140 km (87 mi) from the Chinese coast. Part of the continental shelf, the Strait is no more than 100 m (330 ft) deep, and has become a land bridge during glacial periods.

Taiwan is a tilted fault block, with rugged longitudinal mountain ranges making up most of the eastern two-thirds of the island. They include more than two hundred peaks with elevations of over 3,000 m (9,800 ft). The western side of the island slopes down to fertile coastal plains. The island straddles the Tropic of Cancer, and has a humid subtropical climate. The original vegetation ranged from tropical rainforest in the lowlands through temperate forests, boreal forest and alpine plants with increasing altitude.

== Late Paleolithic ==
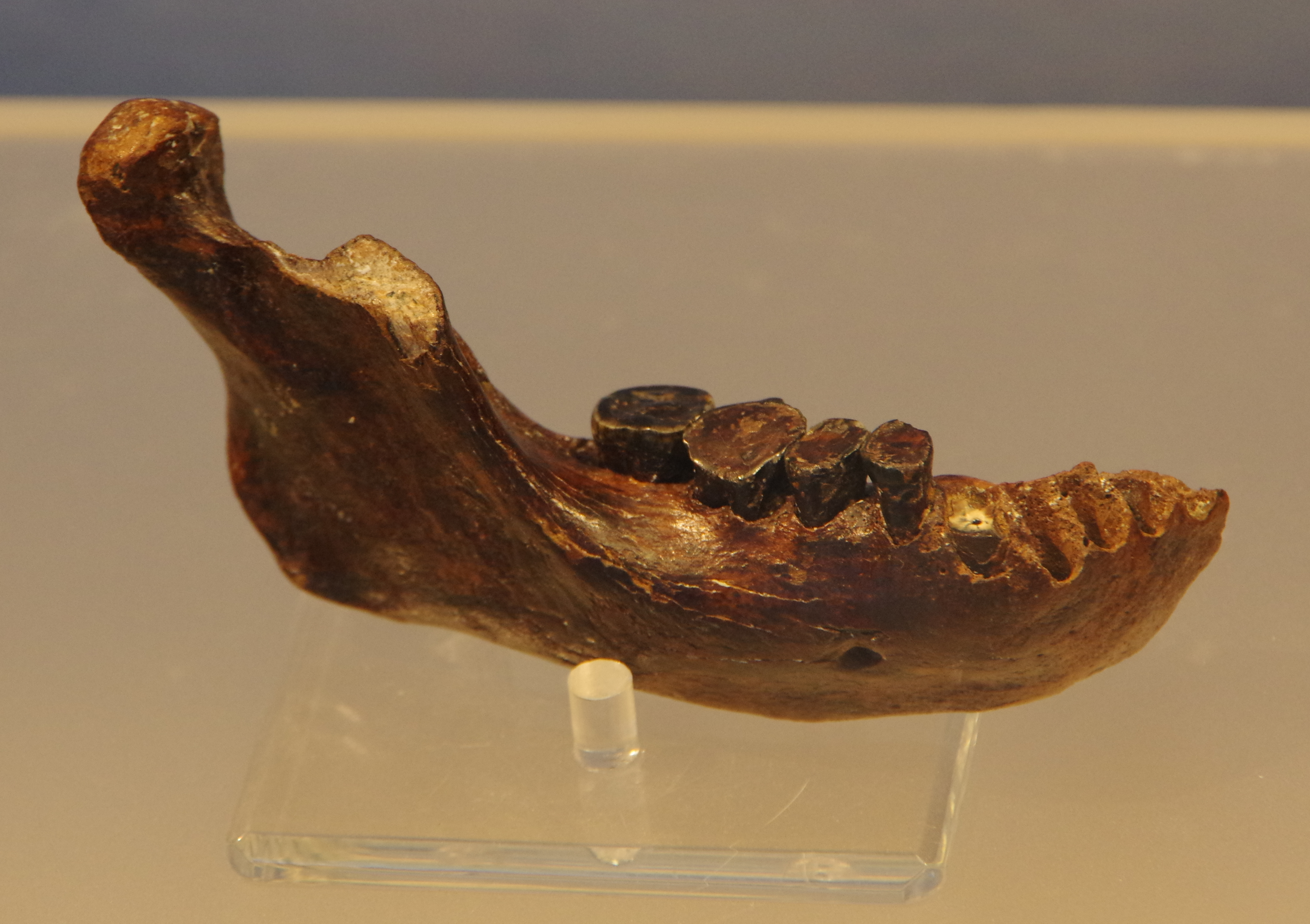
Partial jawbone found between Penghu and Taiwan, designated Penghu 1

During the Late Pleistocene glaciation, sea levels in the area were about 140 m (460 ft) lower than in the present day. As a result, the floor of the Taiwan Strait was exposed as a broad land bridge that was crossed by mainland fauna until the beginning of the Holocene 10,000 years ago. A concentration of vertebrate fossils has been found in the channel between the Penghu Islands and Taiwan, including a partial jawbone designated Penghu 1, apparently belonging to a previously unknown species of genus Homo. These fossils are likely to date from one of the two most recent periods when the Strait was exposed, 10–70 kya and 130–190 kya.

The Ryukyu Islands to the northeast of Taiwan were settled during marine isotope stage (MIS) 3, which ended around 30,000 years ago. It is likely that the southern (and possibly central) Ryukyus were settled via voyages from Taiwan.

In 1972, fragmentary fossils of anatomically modern humans were found at Chouqu and Gangzilin, in Zuojhen District, Tainan, in fossil beds exposed by erosion of the Cailiao River. Though some of the fragments are believed to be more recent, three cranial fragments and a molar tooth have been dated as between 20,000 and 30,000 years old. The find has been dubbed "Zuozhen Man". No associated artifacts have been found at the site.

The earliest evidence of human habitation in Taiwan was found at the Baxian Caves with Paleolithic stone tools dated to around 30,000 year ago. Some of the oldest known artifacts are chipped-pebble tools of the Changbin culture (長濱文化), found at cave sites on the southeast coast of the island. The sites are dated 15,000 to 5,000 years ago, and similar to contemporary sites in Fujian. The primary site of Baxiandong (八仙洞), in Changbin, Taitung was first excavated in 1968. The same culture has been found at sites at Eluanbi on the southern tip of Taiwan, persisting until 5,000 years ago. The earliest layers feature large stone tools, and suggest a hunting and gathering lifestyle. Later layers have small stone tools of quartz, as well as tools made from bone, horn and shell, and suggest a shift to intensive fishing and shellfish collection.

The distinct Wangxing culture (網形) was discovered in Miaoli County in northwest Taiwan in the 1980s. The assemblage consists of flake tools, becoming smaller and more standardized over time, and indicating a shift from gathering to hunting.

Analysis of spores and pollen grains in sediment of Sun Moon Lake suggests that traces of slash-and-burn agriculture started in the area since 11,000 years ago, and ended 4,200 years ago, when abundant remains of rice cultivation were found.

The only Paleolithic burial that has been found on Taiwan was in Xiaoma cave in Chenggong in the southeast of the island, dating from about 4000 BC, of a male similar in type to Negritos found in the Philippines. There are also references in Chinese texts and Formosan Aboriginal oral traditions to pygmies on the island at some time in the past.

In December 2011, a skeleton dated about 8,000 years ago was found on Liang Island, off the north coast of Fujian. In 2014, the mitochondrial DNA of the Liangdao Man skeleton was found to belong to Haplogroup E, which is today found throughout Maritime Southeast Asia. Moreover, it had two of the four mutations characteristic of the E1 subgroup. From this, Ko et al. infer that Haplogroup E arose 8,000 to 11,000 years ago on the north Fujian coast, travelled to Taiwan with Neolithic settlers 6,000 years ago, and from there spread to Maritime Southeast Asia with the Austronesian language dispersal. Soares et al. caution against overemphasizing a single sample, and maintain that a constant molecular clock implies an earlier date (and more southerly origin) for Haplogroup E remains more likely.

== Neolithic ==
Expansion of Austronesian languages and associated archeological cultures

Between 4000 and 3000 BC, the Dapenkeng culture (named after a site in Taipei county) abruptly appeared and quickly spread around the coast of the island, as well as Penghu. Dapenkeng sites are relatively homogeneous, characterized by pottery impressed with cord marks, pecked pebbles, highly polished stone adzes and thin points of greenish slate. The inhabitants cultivated rice and millet, and engaged in hunting, but were also heavily reliant on marine shells and fish. Most scholars believe this culture is not derived from the Changbin culture, but was brought across the Strait by the ancestors of today's Taiwanese aborigines, speaking early Austronesian languages. No ancestral culture on the mainland has been identified, but a number of shared features suggest ongoing contacts. However, the overall neolithic-era of Taiwan strait is said, by scholars, to have been descended from Neolithic cultures in the lower Yangtze area, particularly the Hemudu and Majiabang cultures. Physical similarity has been noted between the people of these cultures and the Neolithic inhabitants of Taiwan.

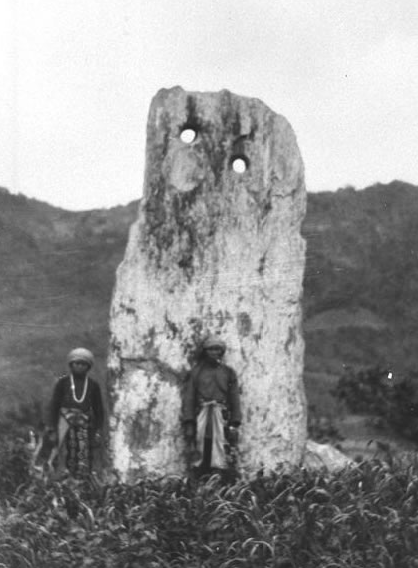
Monolith from the Beinan culture

In the following millennium, these technologies appeared on the northern coast of the Philippine island of Luzon (250 km south of Taiwan), where they, and presumably Austronesian languages, were adopted by the local population. This migration created a branch of Austronesian, the Malayo-Polynesian languages, which have since dispersed across a huge area from Madagascar to Hawaii, Easter Island and New Zealand. All other primary branches of Austronesian are found only on Taiwan, the urheimat of the family.

The successors of the Dapenkeng culture throughout Taiwan were locally differentiated. The Fengpitou (鳳鼻頭) culture, characterized by fine red cord-marked pottery, was found in Penghu and the central and southern parts of the western side of the island, and a culture with similar pottery occupied the eastern coastal areas. These later differentiated into the Niumatou and Yingpu cultures in central Taiwan, the Niuchouzi (牛稠子) and Dahu cultures in the southwest, the Beinan Culture in the southeast and the Qilin (麒麟) culture in the central east. The Yuanshan culture (圓山) in the northeast does not appear to be closely related to these, featuring sectioned adzes, shouldered-stone adzes and pottery without cord impressions. Some scholars suggest that it represents another wave of immigration from southeast China, but no similar culture is known from there either.

Archaeological evidence of prehistoric cultures dating back 4500 years before present was found in Nangang Village, Cimei, Penghu in 1983.

The Niuchouzi Culture flourished around what is now Tainan 2,500 BC to 1,000 BC. They are known for orange pottery decorated with rope patterns.

In the early Neolithic period, jade was used only for tools such are adzes, axes and spear points. From about 2500 BC, jade ornaments began to be produced, peaking in sophistication between 1500 BC and 1 AD, particularly in the Beinan Culture of southern Taiwan. All the jade found on Taiwan came from a deposit of green nephrite at Fengtian, near modern Hualien City. Nephrite from Taiwan began to appear in the northern Philippines between 1850 and 1350 BC, spawning the Philippine jade culture. Around the beginning of the Common Era, artisans in Taiwan switched from jade to metal, glass and carnelian. However, Philippine craftsmen continued to work jade from Taiwan until around 1000 AD, producing lingling-o pendants and other ornaments, which have been found throughout southeast Asia.

== Metal Age ==
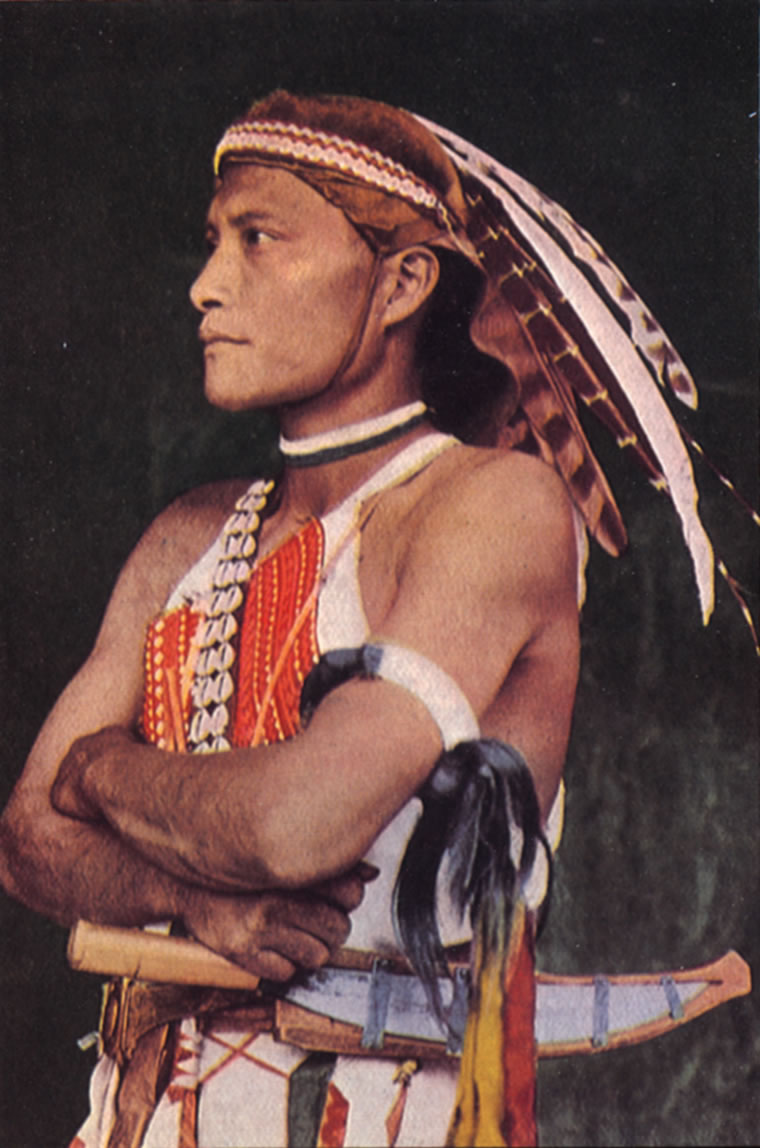
A young Tsou man

Artifacts of iron and other metals appeared on Taiwan around the beginning of the Common Era. At first these were trade goods, but by around AD 400 wrought iron was being produced locally using bloomeries, a technology possibly introduced from the Philippines. Distinct Iron Age cultures have been identified in different parts of the island: the Shihsanhang Culture (十三行文化) in the north, the Fanzaiyuan Culture (番仔園) in the northwest, the Daqiuyuan Culture (大邱園) in the hills of southwest Nantou County, the Kanding Culture in the central west, the Niaosung Culture in the southwest, the Guishan Culture (龜山) at the southern tip of the island, and the Jingpu Culture (靜浦) on the east coast. The earliest trade goods from China found on the island date from the Tang dynasty (618–907 AD).

== Burial customs ==
Prehistoric groups in Taiwan practiced a wide variety of burial practices with each culture having distinct practices. Excavations of ancient gravesites are key to archeologists understanding of these early Taiwanese cultures. Grave goods buried with the dead also provide concrete evidence of complex trade linkages and intercultural exchange. Some of these ancient funerary customs are practiced by modern Taiwanese indigenous cultures but many have been lost.

== See also ==
- Prehistoric Asia
- Cultural history of Taiwan
- Neolithic in China
