= National Museum of Prehistory (Taiwan) =

Museum in Taitung City, Taitung County, Taiwan

- 國立臺灣史前文化博物館

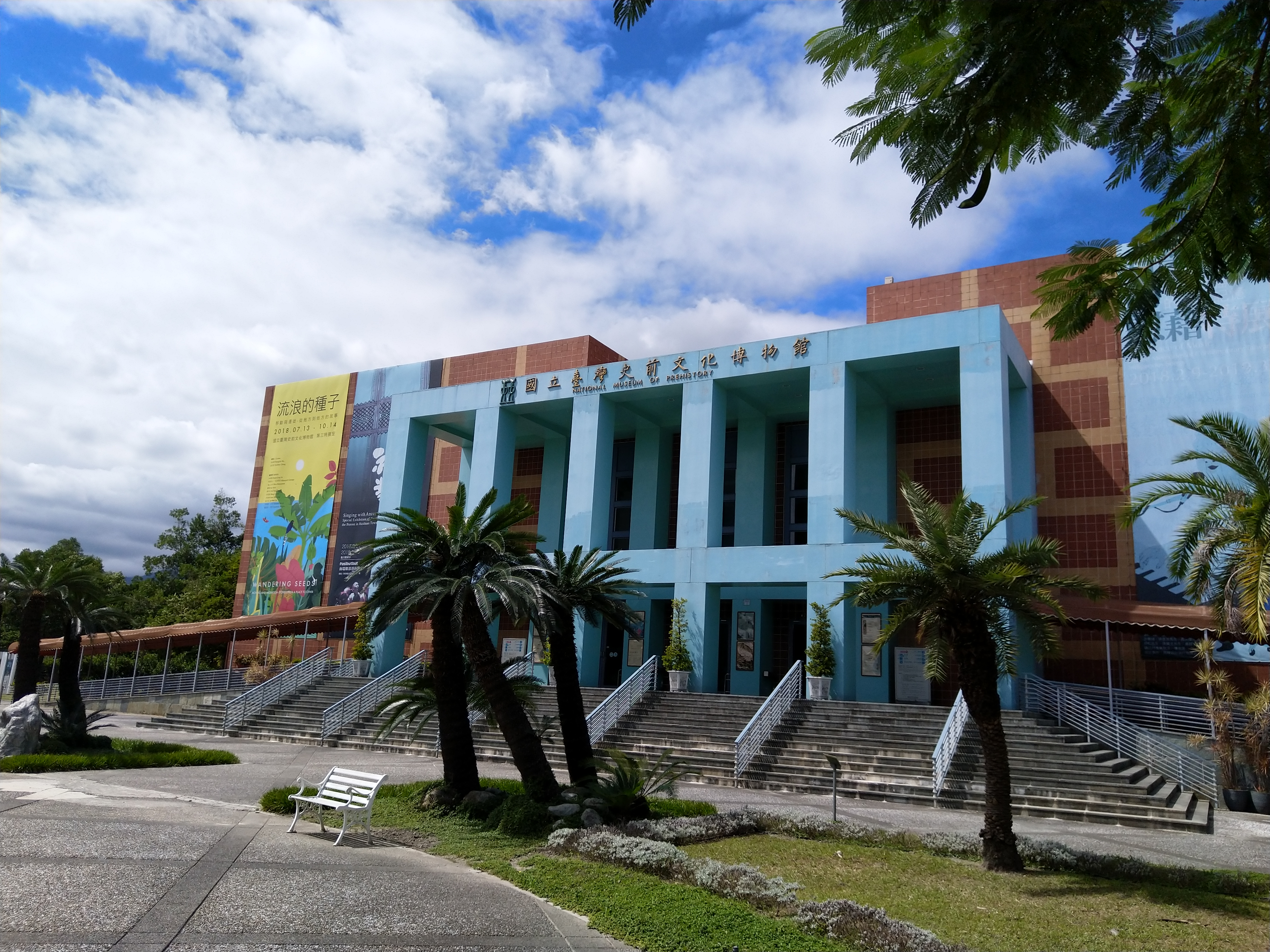
- Established: 17 August 2002
- Location: Taitung City, Taitung County, Taiwan
- Coordinates: 22°45′37″N 121°05′30″E
- Type: History museum
- Website: www.nmp.gov.tw

The National Museum of Prehistory (NMP; Chinese: 國立臺灣史前文化博物館; pinyin: Guólì Táiwān Shǐqián Wénhuà Bówùguǎn) is located in Taitung City, Taitung County, Taiwan.

== History ==
In 1980, during the construction of the South-Link Line, building work uncovered prehistoric remains on the Beinan Site (卑南遺址). Many slate coffins and artifacts were discovered, and after a proposal by the Taitung City Government, construction of Taitung Station was halted. For 10 years, a National Taiwan University-led team excavated the 10,000 m^{2} (110,000 ft^{2}) site and uncovered over 1,500 burials and tens of thousands of artifacts. The site is widely regarded as the most important site of the mid-Neolithic age in Taiwan, and was then later transformed into the Beinan Cultural Park.

An outdoor museum was proposed and approved in 1990. Trial operations began on July 10, 2001, and the museum officially opened on August 17, 2002.

The museum underwent renovation starting on 31 May 2020.

== Architecture ==
The museum was designed by American architect Michael Graves and is situated on a 10 ha (100,000 m^{2}) parcel of land.

The museum is divided into several sections, including:

- Sun Square
- Mountain Square
- Administrative Building
- Scenic Garden
- Children's Play Area
- The Maze
- Water Fountain Show
- Bird Singing Square
- Sightseeing Hill.

== Exhibitions ==
- Natural History of Taiwan designed by MET Studio, London
- Prehistory of Taiwan
- Indigenous Peoples of Taiwan designed by MET Studio, London
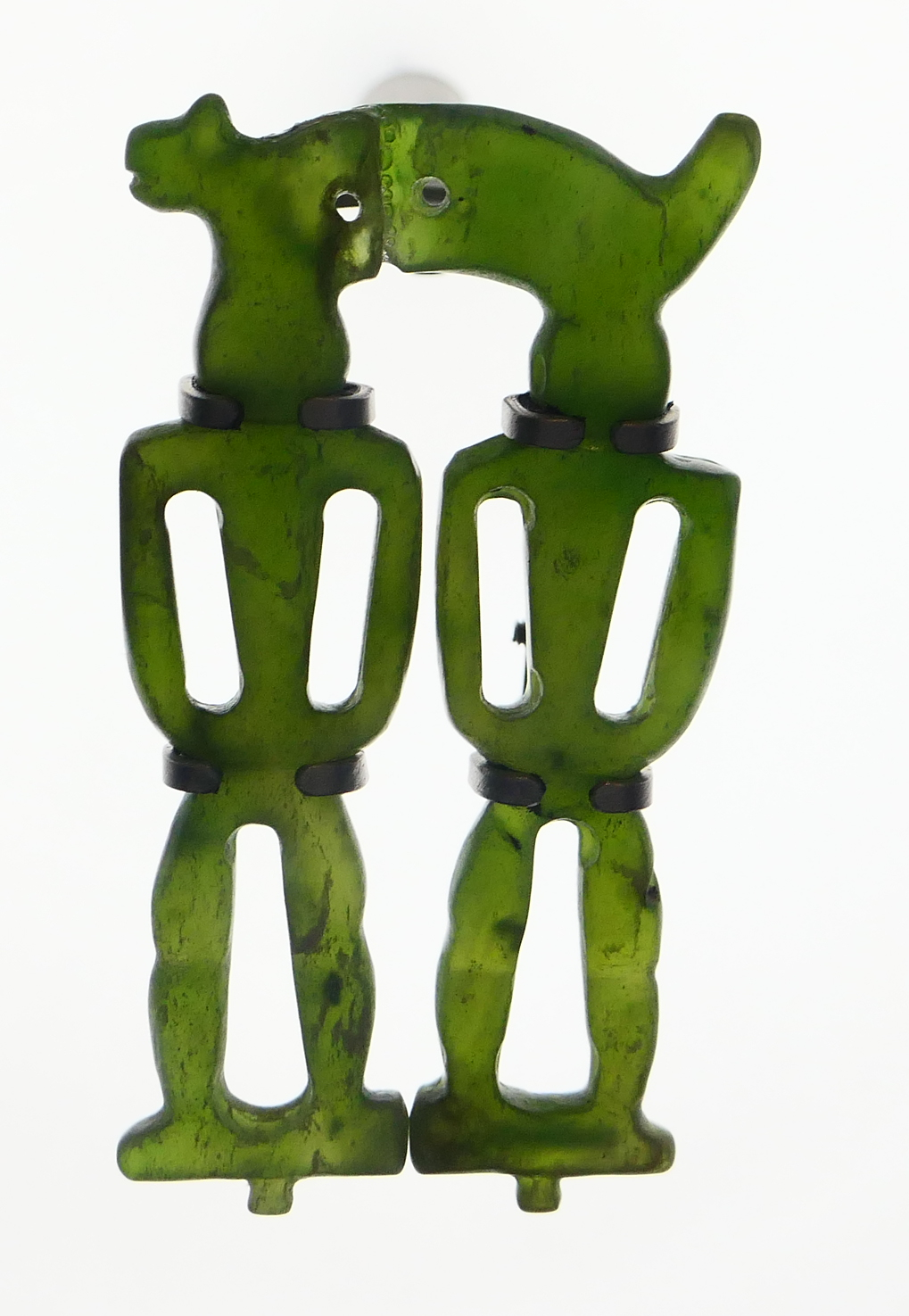
Archaeological artifact from Beinan Site

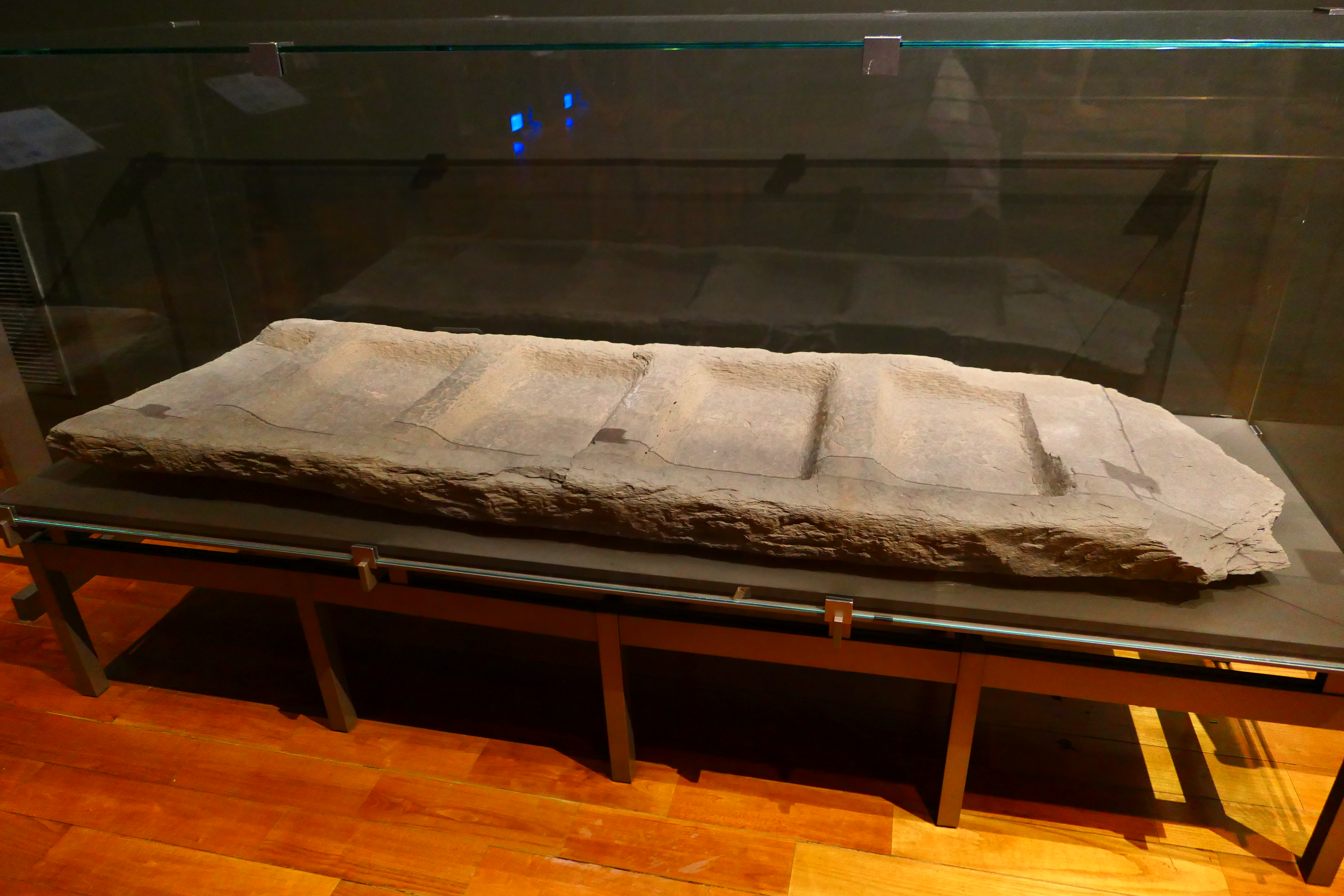
Archaeological artifact from Beinan Site

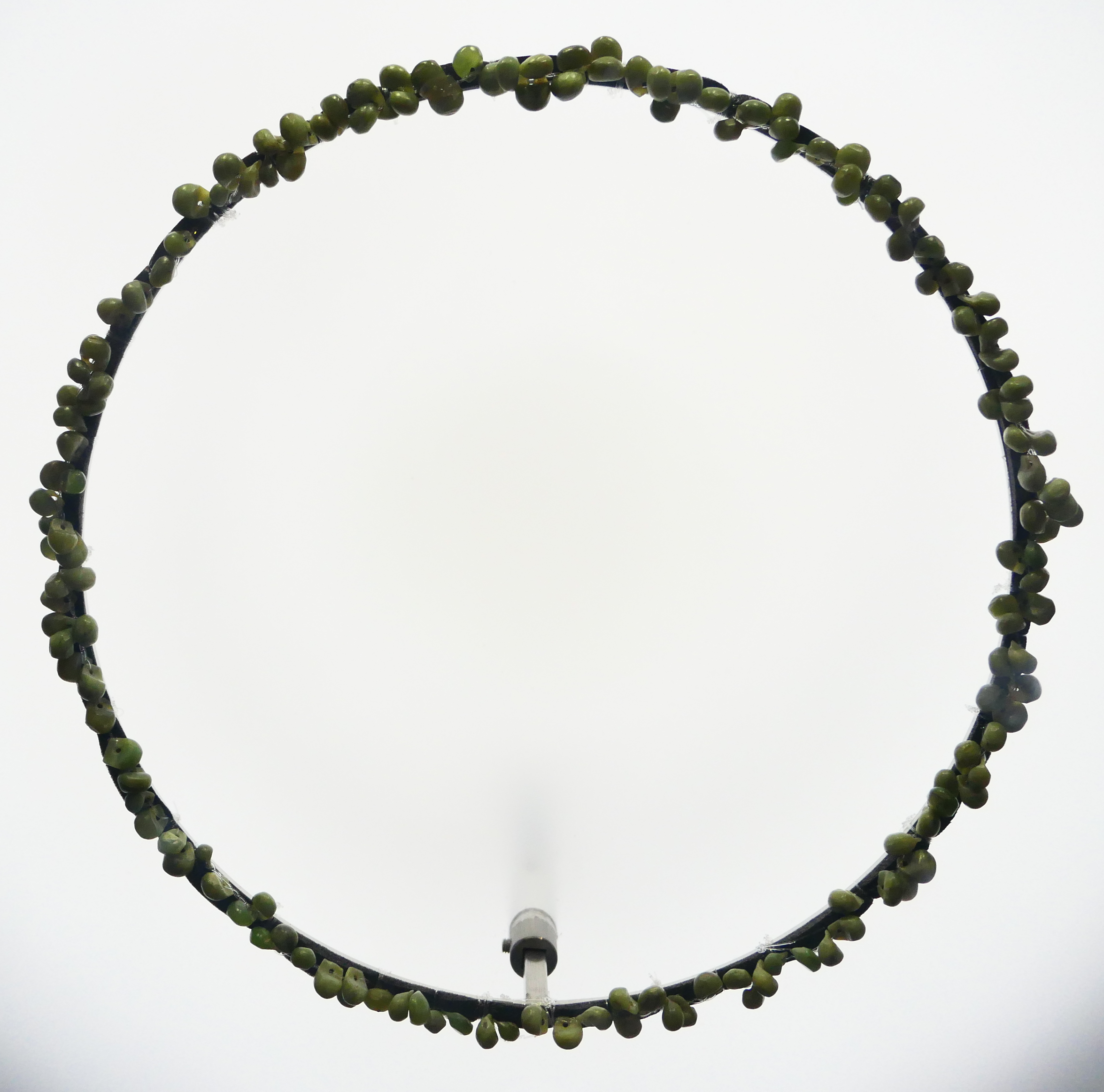
Archaeological artifact from Beinan Site

== Transportation ==
The museum is accessible within walking distance from Kangle Station of Taiwan Railway.

== Branches ==
- Museum of Archaeology in Tainan

== See also ==
- List of museums in Taiwan
- Beinan Cultural Park
