= Peinan Site Park =

Archaeological site in Taitung City, Taiwan

- 卑南遺址公園 (Chinese)
- Peinan Archaeological Park
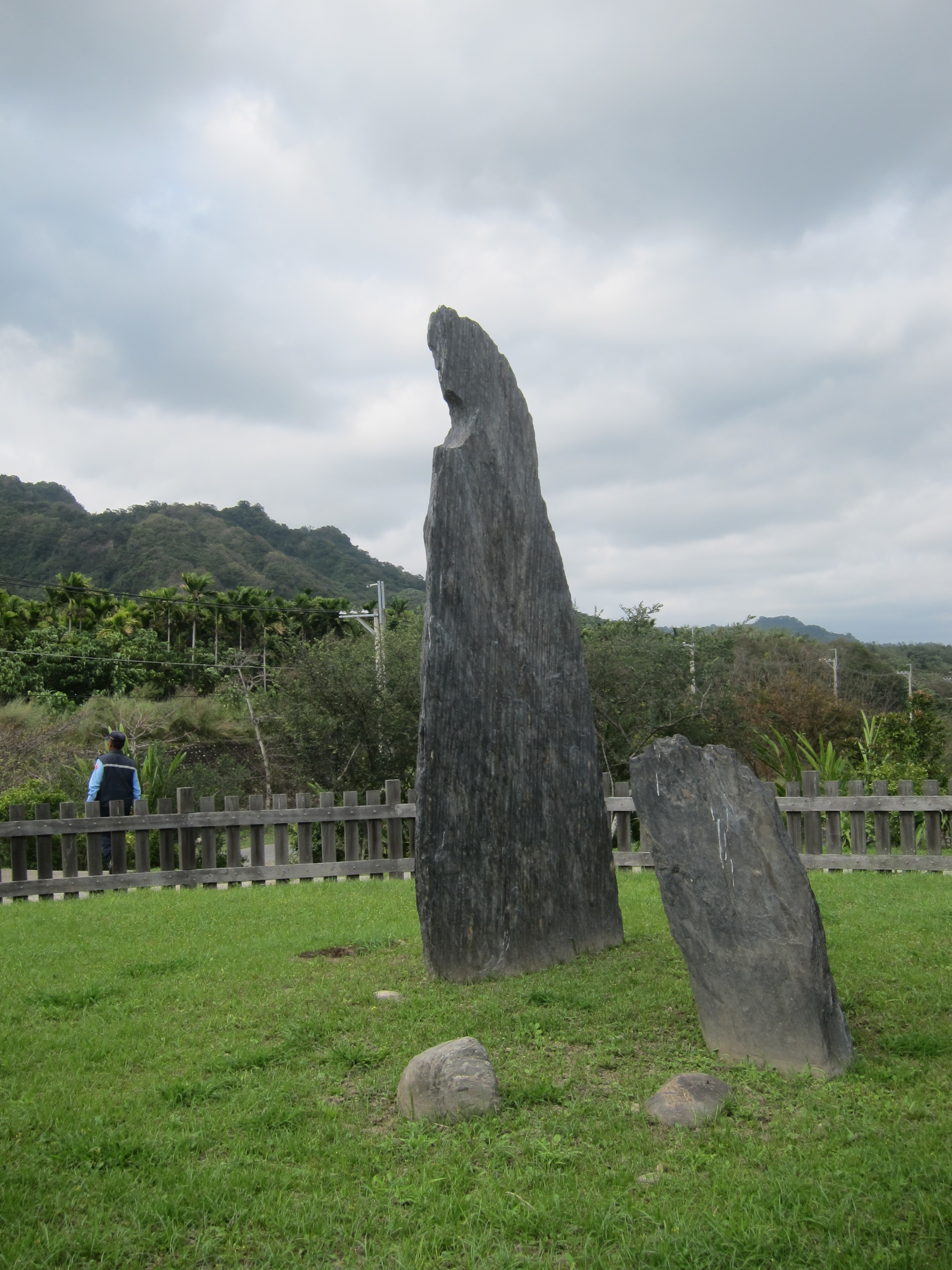

- Location within Taitung County
- 22°47′39.3″N 121°06′59.2″E
- Type: archeological site
- Location: Taitung City, Taitung County, Taiwan

Site notes
- Area: 10,000 m^{2} (110,000 sq ft)
- Discovered: 1980
- Public access: Taitung Station

Peinan Site Park (traditional Chinese: 卑南遺址公園; simplified Chinese: 卑南遺址公园; pinyin: Pēinán Yízhǐ Gōngyuán) is an archeological site in Taitung City, Taitung County, Taiwan. The park is the site for the largest and most complete prehistoric settlement ever discovered in Taiwan.

== Geography ==
The park covers an area of 10,000 square metres (2.5 acres) and contains more than 1,600 burial sites. It is part of the "Beinan Archaeological Site and Mt. Dulan" potential World Heritage Site.

== Peinan Site ==
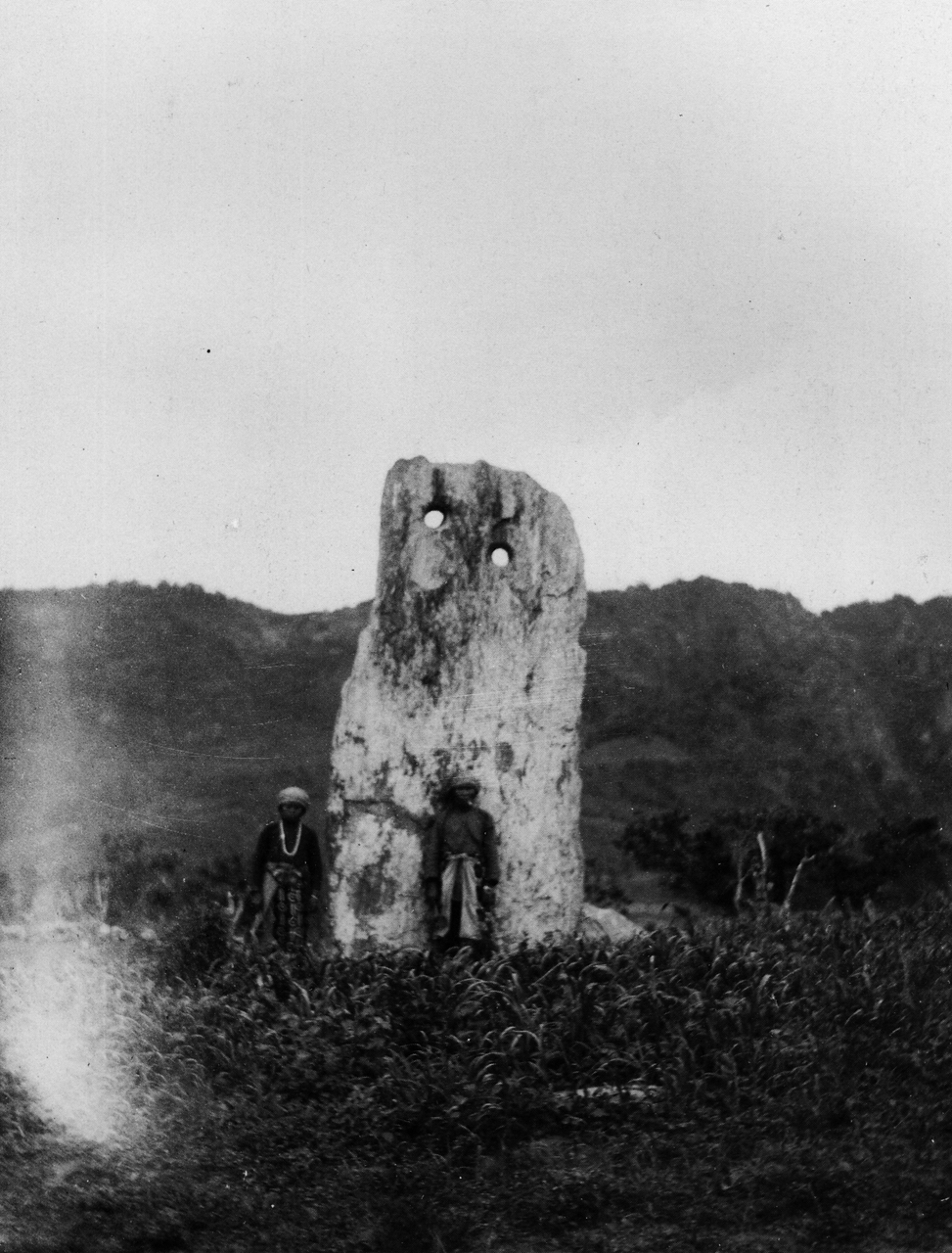
The Puyuma's Moon-shape Monolith ca. 1896

The earliest records of the prehistoric Peinan Site in Taitung City were made by Torii Ryūzō, an anthropologist in the early period of the Japanese rule. During his four visits to Taiwan for anthropological research, he photographed the monolithic stone pillars at the site.

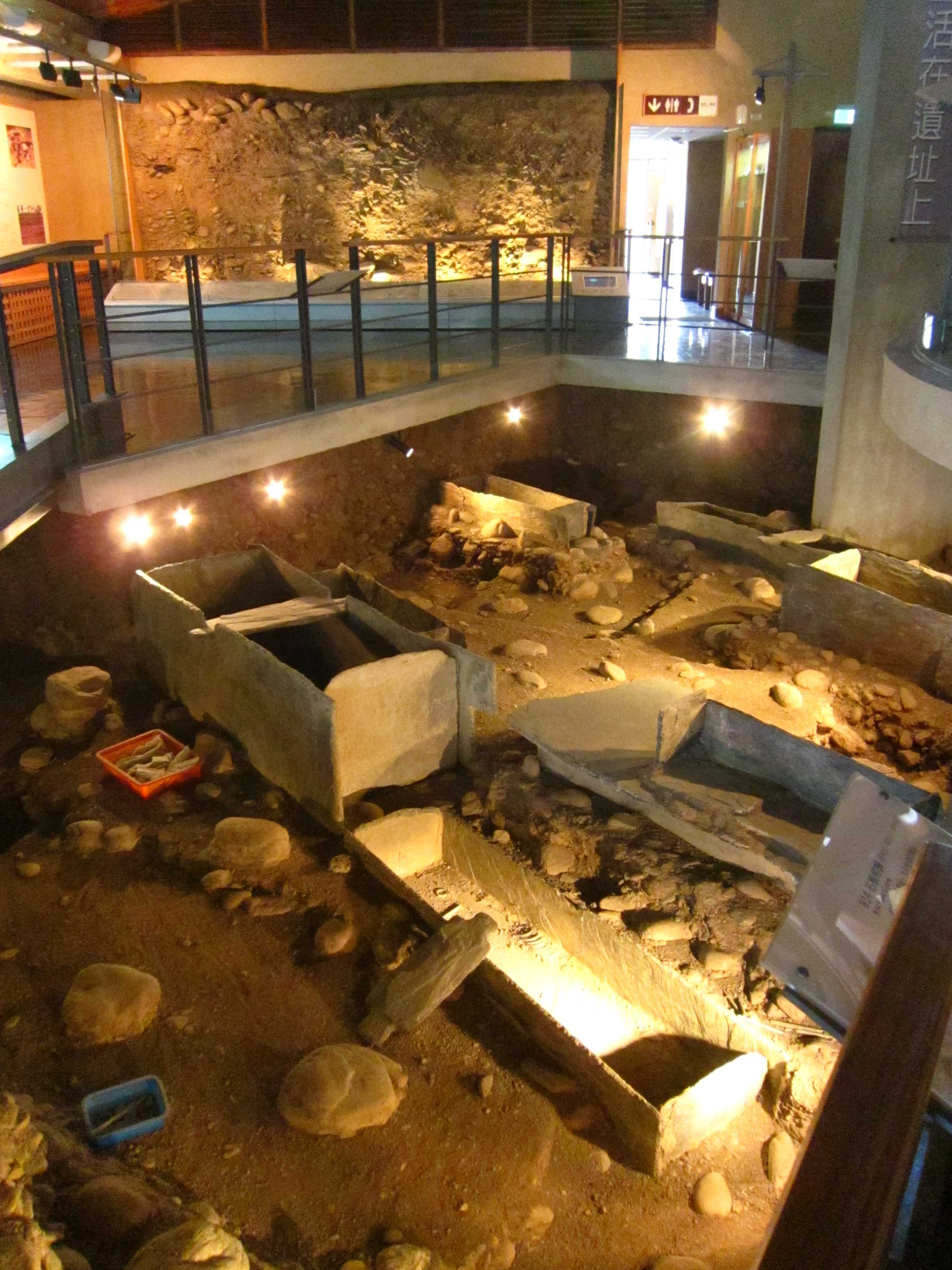
Excavation of the Beinan site

This historic settlement area was discovered during the construction work of the back part of Taitung railway station in 1980 when a graveyard containing several thousand slate coffins was unearthed, with some bodies still laid within. Around 20,000 pieces of jade, pottery and stone tools were also found. This induced the government to carry out archeological work and build a national museum to preserve the artifacts.

Peinan Site Park opened in 1997 to display and preserve the archaeological site, considered the most important one in Taiwan. An indoor/outdoor Museum of Prehistory opened in 2002.

== Features ==
The park consists of an archeological site for visitors and the nearby National Museum of Prehistory which was opened in 2002.

== See also ==
- Jade tube
- Mount Dulan
- List of parks in Taiwan
- Prehistory of Taiwan
- National Museum of Prehistory (Taiwan)
