= Lynn Miles (activist) =

Human rights activist

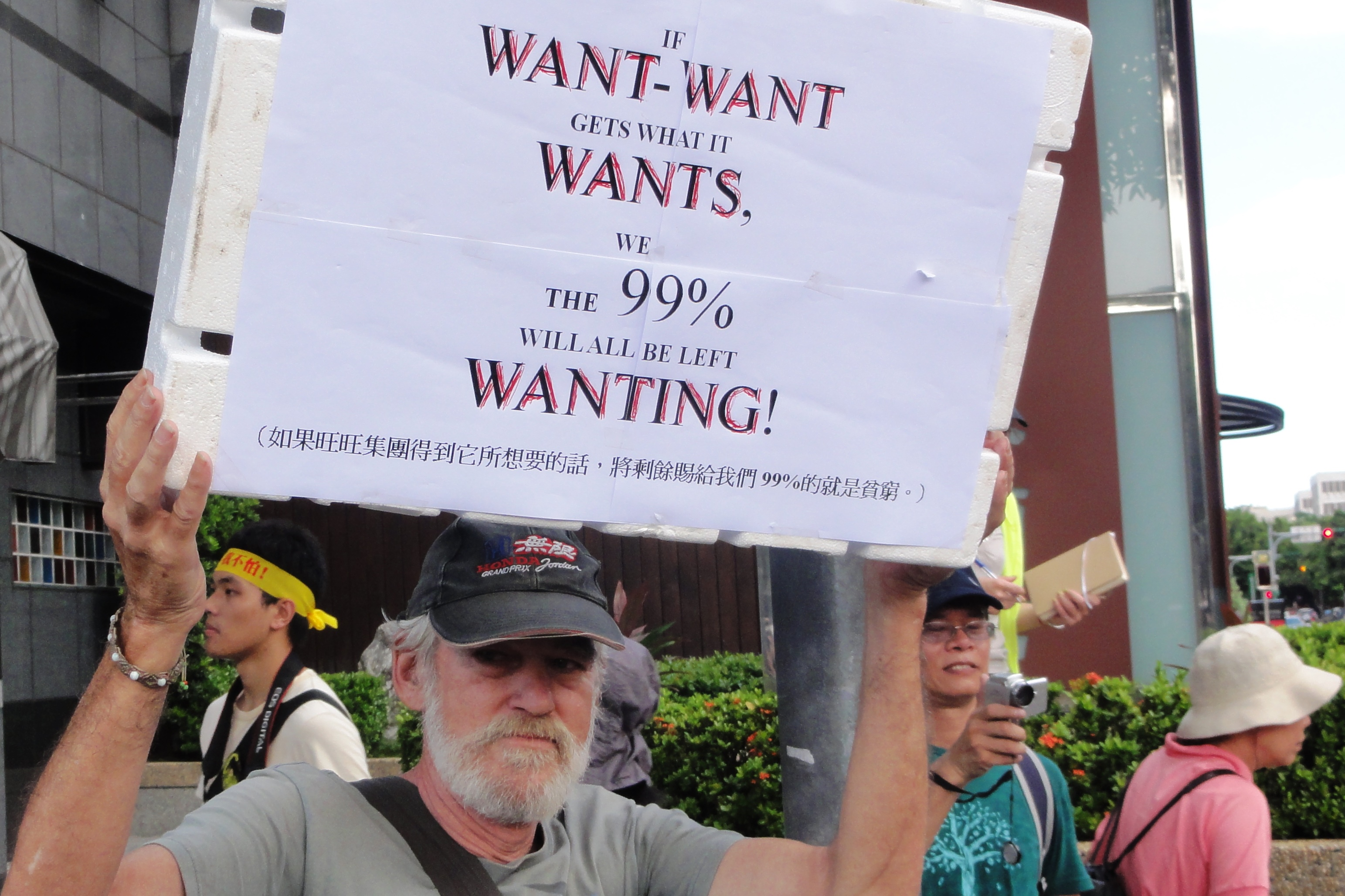
- Miles attending a protest in 2012
- Born: Lynn Alan Miles; June 15, 1943; New Jersey, US
- Died: June 8, 2015 (aged 71); Xindian, New Taipei City, Taiwan
- Organization: International Committee for the Defense of Human Rights in Taiwan

Lynn Alan Miles (Chinese: 梅心怡; pinyin: Méi Xīnyí; 15 June 1943 – 8 June 2015) was an American human rights activist in Taiwan.

== Biography ==
Miles was born in New Jersey and first went to Taiwan in 1962, at the invitation of his college classmate whose father was a ranking security official. After a few months of living with the family, Lynn came to believe that "Free China" was neither free nor China.

Miles sought out Li Ao, a critical author who was writing for Wenshing Magazine, and this began the human rights and protest side of his life. Li Ao introduced Lynn to Presbyterian and other ministers such as Milo Thornberry who were secretly collecting information on the abuses of the regime. Lynn met as well Hsieh Tsung-min and Peng Ming-min, who had issued a Taiwan statement of "self-salvation" in 1964, and gone to jail for it.

In September 1967, Miles and Klaus-Peter Metzke opened a cafe called The Barbarian. It was turned over to a third partner, Hung Teng-sheng, and closed in 1970. That same year, Miles helped Peng Ming-min escape from Taiwan to Sweden.

Miles had gone to Vietnam to work for a civilian contractor, a helicopter parts supplier, as a way to get a deferment from the draft. This provided him travel all over Vietnam, as well as regular R&R trips on US military flights to Japan by way of Taiwan, which gave him opportunity to smuggle letters for Li Ao, and indirectly for Peng Ming-min.

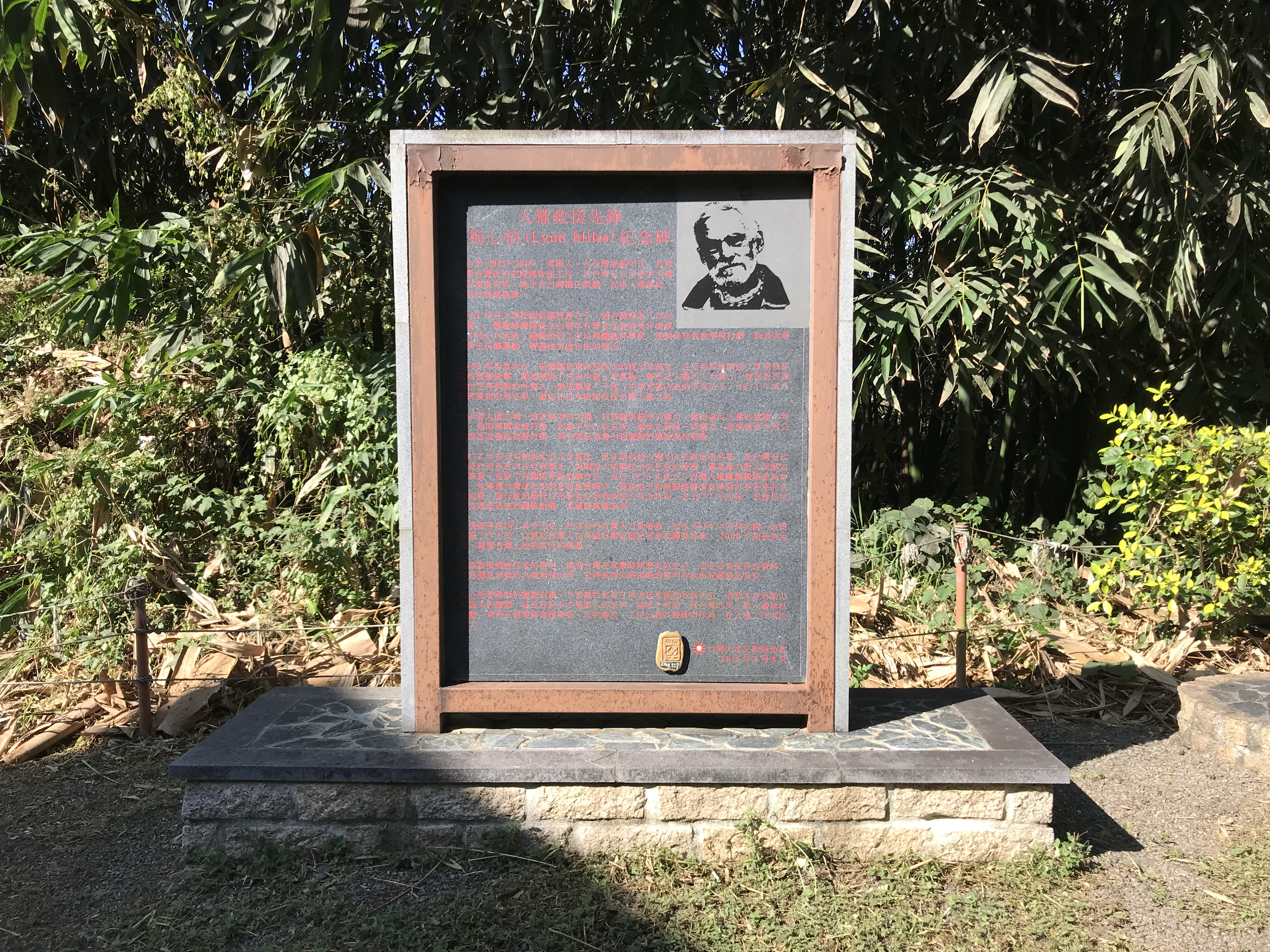
Monument of Lynn Miles

In the wake of Peng Ming-min's escape in January 1970, all of his associates came under great pressure from the government. By that time Miles was living in Japan with his new wife, a Japan Airlines stewardess, but was forced out temporarily by visa regulations, and ended up on Li Ao's doorstep. He witnessed the heavy police harassment of Li Ao and Hsieh and Wei Ting-chao, and tried to give them access to foreign reporters. Miles was forced out of Taiwan as their arrests loomed. In Japan, he took up their cases, and joined the new network of Amnesty International. He also linked up with the efforts of Miyake Kiyoko (San Dzai Ching-dze) who was for a while still able to slip in and out of Taiwan and visit the wives of those imprisoned and human rights informants. He did a prodigious amount of translation from Chinese and Japanese into English for newsletters and reports.

However, due to AI's restrictions on who could make statements on behalf of AI, Miles formed the International Committee for the Defense of Human Rights in Taiwan in 1975 in order to be able to react more quickly to events. Miles also began to more actively train foreign students in Japan to undertake human rights missions while on jaunts around Asia. He was able to link up with foreign students in Taiwan through Professor Chen Guying and others, and Dennis Engbarth, Rosemary Haddon, Cathy Kearney, and Linda Gail Arrigo were his informants in Taiwan by 1977. He worked with Organization for the Support of Democratic Movement in Taiwan to stay the execution of the political prisoner Chen Ming-chung in 1978.

With the rise of the Formosa Magazine democratic movement in Taiwan from late 1977 to 1979, Miles became a link for contact with world media, and his ICDHRT newsletter had a mailing list of 200. In 1979 the newsletter was transferred to Seattle and became Taiwan Communique, long associated with Gerrit van der Weis.

The New Jersey-born Miles was deported and blacklisted from Taiwan for 25 years, beginning in 1971. During this time he assisted Taiwanese activists while living in Japan and the United States. In 1979 he returned to the United States, after a divorce from his first wife with whom he had one daughter. He later re-married and had two more daughters. In Connecticut, living with his father, Miles threw himself into human rights work for El Salvador, ruled by a government then supported by President Ronald Reagan. He also protested the US invasion of Iraq in the first Gulf War.

Miles did not lose his contacts connected to Taiwan human rights issues. In 1985 and 1986 he spent much of his time on overseas efforts for democratization, including the July 1985 hunger strike in Washington DC, and the 1986 "Acquino" action of Hsu Hsin-liang to take a Taiwan Democratic Party back to Taiwan. Not long after, he moved his family to Los Angeles to work for the Taiwanese-American Citizen League in Los Angeles.

Miles was allowed to return to Taiwan briefly in 1991 and followed the campaign of a challenger to the KMT's monopoly, but then was again banned. Thanks to the efforts of the Democratic Progressive Party, he was allowed to return to Taiwan to work for the DPP in 1996. However, most of his time went into anti-nuclear and indigenous rights and environmental movements.

In 2006, during the Chen Shui-bian administration, the Ministry of the Interior granted Miles permanent residency for his "special contributions to the nation." He spent his later years in Lungtan, Taoyuan, and was a professor at Fu Jen Catholic University.

In 2008 Linda Gail Arrigo and Miles published a book entitled "A Borrowed Voice: Taiwan Human Rights through International Networks, 1960-80" (ISBN 978-986-84338-0-9), based on Miles' archives that had been transported to the Wu San-lien Historical Materials Center, declassified documents, and 2003 interviews with formerly deported missionaries and others.

Miles regularly took part in social movements and protests, including burning his U.S. passport on March 23, 2003 to protest the US-led invasion of Iraq. He took part in the Sunflower Student Movement and was one of 119 protesters indicted in February 2015.

Miles died of cancer in Taipei on June 8, 2015. His funeral was held two days before his 72nd birthday, and was attended by fellow activist Linda Arrigo, and politicians Tsai Ing-wen, Hsu Hsin-liang, and Su Chih-fen.
