= Hsu Kuo-tai =

Taiwanese politician

Hsu Kuo-tai MLY
- 許國泰

Member of the Legislative Yuan
- In office 1 February 1990 – 31 January 1996
- Constituency: Taoyuan County
- In office 1 February 1987 – 31 January 1990
- Constituency: Taiwan 2nd (Taoyuan County, Hsinchu County, Miaoli County)

Personal details
- Party: Democratic Progressive Party (since 1986)
- Relations: Hsu Hsin-liang (brother); Hsu Chung Pi-hsia (sister-in-law)
- Occupation: politician

Hsu Kuo-tai (Chinese: 許國泰) is a Taiwanese politician. A member of the Democratic Progressive Party, he served three consecutive terms on the Legislative Yuan from 1987 to 1996.

== Life and career ==
He and his older brother Hsu Hsin-liang were raised by a family of farmers. Hsu Kuo-tai ran for a seat on the Legislative Yuan in December 1983, but split the vote with another tangwai candidate, Chang Teh-ming, and neither was elected. Hsu was named a Democratic Progressive Party legislative candidate on the day of its establishment in 1986. Later that year, he led a demonstration at Chiang Kai-shek International Airport in support of his brother, who had attempted to return to Taiwan that December, having left the country for the United States in 1979, and actively opposed the Kuomintang government in his time overseas. Days after the protest, Hsu Kuo-tai received 141,888 votes in the legislative elections. The result was the highest vote share in Taiwan's second district, and the fourth highest vote share of 237 total legislative candidates. Fellow Democratic Progressive Party members Hsu Jung-shu, Hung Chi-chang, and You Ching were the only candidates to win more votes than Hsu. Interpellation sessions led by Hsu tackled controversial issues and governmental actions, such as the lifting of martial law in Taiwan and the death of Henry Liu. Hsu lost a 1989 party primary to Lin Hsi-mo and Wu Pao-yu. However, the Democratic Progressive Party chose to nominate Hsu and Lin for legislative seats. Hsu returned to the Legislative Yuan in 1993, representing Taoyuan until 1996. Hsu Kuo-tai financed his brother's 2011 bid for the DPP presidential nomination, which eventually went to Tsai Ing-wen.
