= Linda Arrigo =

American activist in Taiwan (born 1949)

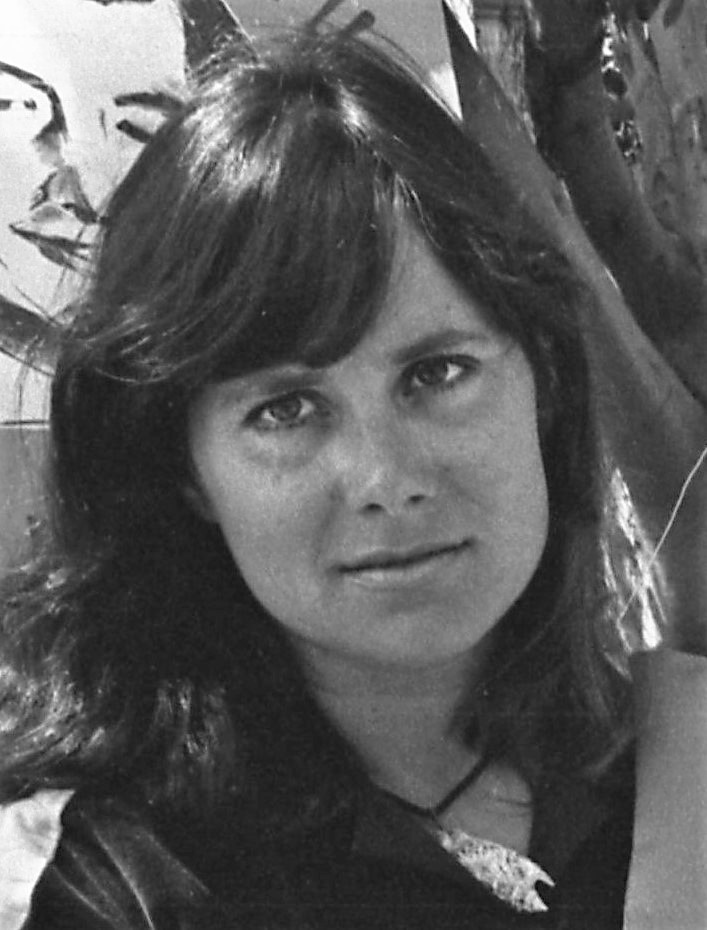
- Arrigo in 1980

International Coordinator, Green Party Taiwan
- In office 1996–2004

Spokesperson, Democratic Progressive Party
- In office 1991–1993

Personal details
- Born: January 16, 1949 (age 77) Virginia, United States
- Party: Green Party Taiwan (since 1996?)
- Other political affiliations: Democratic Progressive Party (1991 to 1993?)
- Spouses: George Chen; (1968-1977); Shih Ming-teh; (1978-1995); Ho Shu-yuan; (1999-?)
- Children: 1 son, Roger (b.1969)
- Education: University of California, San Diego (BA); Stanford University (MA)
- Nickname(s): 艾琳達; Ài Líndá

Linda Gail Arrigo (Chinese: 艾琳達; pinyin: Ài Líndá; born January 16, 1949) is an American political activist, human rights activist, and academic researcher in Taiwan. She formerly served as the international affairs officer of Green Party Taiwan. She is the ex-wife of the former chairman of the Democratic Progressive Party, Shih Ming-teh.

== Early life and education ==
Arrigo was born in Virginia to Joseph and Nellie Arrigo. She went to Taiwan as a teenager in 1963 with her father, a United States Army logistics officer who was assigned to the Military Assistance Advisory Group (MAAG) in Taiwan.

Arrigo attended Taipei American School and, after graduating as valedictorian in 1966, eloped with her Taiwanese-American husband, George Chen, to the U.S. in 1968. She received her undergraduate degree in 1972 from the University of California, San Diego. She then attended Stanford University and obtained a master's degree in anthropology in 1976 after ideological disagreements with her advisors there.

== Career ==
=== Fieldwork in Taiwan ===
Arrigo initially returned to Taiwan in 1975 to continue work on her doctorate research by studying the marriage and labor issues of Taiwanese women entering the workplace. Working with these women and their families would lead her to see Taiwan from their point of view, and in the late 1970s she became active in human rights and opposition politics. She left California, leaving behind her first husband George and her son Roger (born 1969). She became a part of the 1978 campaign coalition that later evolved into the Democratic Progressive Party (DPP), and in 1978 married Shih Ming-teh, a former political prisoner. Shih soon became the general manager of Formosa Magazine, and Linda served in English public relations for the magazine. Shih would later (1991) become the DPP chairman.

Arrigo has also written about land struggles and environmental degradation in Taiwan.

=== Deportation and US activities ===
On 15 December 1979, she was deported and then blacklisted from Taiwan by James Soong, then head of the Government Information Office, for her involvement in the Kaohsiung Incident. The ROC government accused Arrigo of spying for the Central Intelligence Agency (CIA). She returned to California following the deportation.

Shih Ming-teh was arrested in the wake of the Kaohsiung Incident. After trial, he was sentenced in April 1980 to life imprisonment under the continuing martial law (1949–1987). Arrigo and her mother brought international media attention to the Kaohsiung Incident, resulting in unprecedented Taiwanese media attention to the trials. Seven other leading dissidents also received sentences of ten or more years for sedition, and the mother and daughters of one, Provincial Assemblyman Lin Yi-hsiung, were murdered on February 28, 1980.

In the US, Arrigo was arrested in 1981 while protesting the mysterious death of Chen Wen-chen. She moved from California to New York in 1983 for further graduate study in the Department of Sociology, Binghamton University. In July 1985, Arrigo and several others staged a hunger strike in sympathy with Shih Ming-teh's hunger strike, which was aimed at forming an opposition party in Taiwan.

=== Return to Taiwan ===
In May 1990, Arrigo was permitted to return to Taiwan after Shih's release where she became politically active in the Green Party Taiwan and Taiwan Environmental Protection Union. She taught at Shih Hsin University in Taipei and acted as a liaison for non-governmental organizations (NGOs). Shih and Arrigo formally divorced in June 1995 after she accused him of violating human rights principles in the party's international relations.

She finished work on her PhD (1996) from the Binghamton University. The title of her doctoral dissertation was "The Economics of Inequality in an Agrarian Society: Land Ownership, Land Tenure, Population Processes and the Rate of Rent in 1930’s China".

In 1997, she published Muckraker! An Overall Critique of the Opposition Movement in Taiwan, a collection of her political essays. Arrigo married for the third time in September 1999, to Ho Shu-yuan, a bus driver at a Taipei primary school that she met doing environmental volunteering; but the couple has long been separated.

In 2001, she and Wang Feng-ying (Betty, 汪鳳英) accused Parris H. Chang, a Democratic Progressive Party legislator, of sexual harassment. Chang filed a libel lawsuit against the two women. Arrigo also filed a lawsuit against her former husband, Shih Ming-teh, for alimony. She won the lawsuit but Shih said he would only pay the money if she would "behave herself".

=== Recent activity ===
She publicly criticized her former husband, Shih Ming-teh, in 2006, when he launched a campaign to oust President Chen Shui-bian. Arrigo contended that his campaign was financed and supported by the Kuomintang (KMT).

In 2008, she completed a book in English compiling the experiences of early foreign human rights activists in Taiwan, entitled A Borrowed Voice: Taiwan Human Rights through International Networks, 1960-1980 (with co-author Lynn Miles), published with a grant from the Taiwan government's Bureau of Cultural Reconstruction, then under a DPP administration.

From 2007 to 2012, Arrigo taught at Taipei Medical University, Taiwan.

== Selected works ==
- Arrigo, Linda Gail (1996). The Economics of Inequality in an Agrarian Society - Landownership, Land Tenure, Population Processes, and the Rate of Rent in 1930s China (Ph.D.). State University of New York at Binghamton. OCLC 37015294.
- Arrigo, Linda Gail (1997). 激盪：台灣反對運動的總批判 [Muckraker! An Overall Critique of the Taiwan Opposition Movement]. Taipei: 前衛出版社. ISBN 9789578011328. OCLC 814270444.
- Arrigo, Linda Gail; Miles, Lynn (2008). 我的聲音借妳: 臺灣人權訴求與國際連絡網 1960-1980 [A borrowed voice: Taiwan human rights through international networks 1960-1980]. Taiwan: Social Empowerment Alliance. ISBN 9789868433809. OCLC 849111383.
- Arrigo, Linda Gail; 林佳瑩 (Lin, Rose Chia-yin) (2011). 美麗的探險 : 艾琳達的一生 [A Beautiful View from the Brink: Linda Gail Arrigo and the Taiwan Democratic Movement] (PDF). Taipei: 遠景出版事業有限公司. ISBN 9789573908074. OCLC 777954357.
