= Sisy Chen =

Taiwanese journalist, television commentator, writer and former politician

- 陳文茜
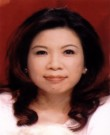

Member of the Legislative Yuan
- In office 1 February 2002 – 31 January 2005
- Constituency: Taipei City Constituency II

Personal details
- Born: 25 March 1958 (age 68) Luodong, Yilan County, Taiwan
- Party: Democratic Progressive Party (1980–1999); Independent (1999–present)
- Education: National Taiwan University (LLB); University of California, Berkeley; The New School
- Occupation: Television personality; journalist; writer; politician

Sisy Chen or Chen Wen-chien (Chinese: 陳文茜; pinyin: Chén Wénqìan; Wade–Giles: Ch'en Wen-ch'ien; Pe̍h-ōe-jī: Tân Bûn-chhiàn; born 25 March 1958) is a Taiwanese media personality and former politician. She began her political career as a law student at National Taiwan University in the late 1970s, participating in the Tangwai movement. After studying and working in the United States during the 1980s, she returned to Taiwan and served as head of publicity for the Democratic Progressive Party (DPP) from 1994 to 1998, before leaving the party over ideological differences, including her opposition to Taiwan independence. From 2002 to 2005, she served as an independent member of the Legislative Yuan, after which she transitioned to media, hosting programmes including Sisy's World News (2005–).

== Biography ==
She received her LL.B. from National Taiwan University. From 1982 to 1983 she worked as the Vice Editor of the American Version of the China Times Daily News. Throughout the early 1980s, she campaigned for Tangwai candidates and published opposition essays. As a founding member of the Democratic Progressive Party in 1984, she was editor of the opposition's New Tide magazine from 1985 to 1986.

Chen then travelled to the United States to pursue a doctorate at the University of California, Berkeley and later at the New School for Social Research in New York City. She did not complete her studies.

In the early 1990s, Sisy Chen remained active in Taiwanese society as a member of the UN Minority Group for Asia, the chairperson of the Taiwan Relations Center's office of the UN, and the producer for Italian National Broadcast's Asia Department. TVBS voted her No. 4 in its 1995 top ten list in Taiwan. In 1996, she worked as General Manager of Song Records. As she gained more fame as an outspoken and blunt commentator, her position in the Democratic Progressive Party rose and she was appointed director of the DPP Culture and Information Department. Beginning in 1998, she hosted Women's Talk on TVBS and promoted women's issues.

Sisy Chen, an ally of Hsu Hsin-liang, left the DPP in 1999 and emerged as one of its harshest critics. In 2001, as an independent, she won a seat in the Legislative Yuan representing South Taipei City. That same year she accepted a KMT controlled position on the board of Taiwan Television (TTV) and became spokesperson of the Mountain Alliance, a pro-unification think tank that included Hsu Hsin-liang and Shih Ming-teh.

She was a strategist for the Pan Blue Coalition in the 2004 ROC presidential election and debated Mainland Affairs Council Chairwoman Tsai Ing-wen on the March 20 referendum. In the night before the election, she invited a celebrity panel to her show and made the first high-profile claim that the shooting of Chen Shui-bian and Annette Lu earlier that day was probably staged. Some Pan-Blue officials believe this early accusation was a factor Lien-Soong's defeat as it alienated swing voters who switched over to the DPP in Chen's sympathy.

In 2003 Sisy Chen and Wu Cherng-dean joined the PFP legislative caucus.

During a press conference on March 19, 2004 she said that the assassination attempt on Chen Shui-bian and Annette Lu was staged. This caused her to receive political attacks from the blue-camp legislators.

She did not seek reelection in December 2004 and supported her friend Li Ao in his successful bid for a seat. In 2005, Chen published her new book. During the press conference, she revealed her thought of regarding herself as a re-incarnation of a witch in her previous life. She also confessed her deeper ache for love than before.

Outside politics Sisy Chen has been active in the media. From 2002 to the present time, Sisy Chen hosted "Wen Qian Xiao Mei Da," a talk show aimed at exploring and exposing political and social issues in Taiwan. In 2005, Sisy Chen became a host of "Jie Ma Chen Wen Qian," a talk show on Phoenix TV. On her TV shows, Sisy Chen frequently criticized the democratic system of Taiwan.

In 2006 Chen Shui-bian announced that he would file a lawsuit against Sisy Chen for her statement that Chen Shui-bian was going to use a scheduled trip to Palau to ship valuables of his away from Taiwan.
