= History of Taiwan (1945–present) =

As a result of the surrender and occupation of Japan at the end of World War II, the islands of Taiwan and Penghu were placed under the governance of the Republic of China (ROC), (Note: Not to be confused with the People's Republic of China (PRC) established in 1949.) ruled by the Kuomintang (KMT), on 25 October 1945. Following the February 28 massacre in 1947, martial law was declared in 1949 by the Governor of Taiwan, Chen Cheng, and the ROC Ministry of National Defense. Following the end of the Chinese Civil War in 1949, the ROC government retreated from the mainland as the Chinese Communist Party (CCP) proclaimed the establishment of the People's Republic of China (PRC). The KMT retreated to Taiwan and declared Taipei the temporary capital of the ROC. For many years, the ROC and PRC each continued to claim in the diplomatic arena to be the sole legitimate government of "China". In 1971, the United Nations expelled the ROC and replaced it with the PRC.

In 1987, martial law was lifted and Taiwan began a democratisation process, beginning with the abolition of the Temporary Provisions and culminating with the first direct president election in 1996. By 2000, the Democratic Progressive Party (DPP) came to power and began to pursue Taiwanese independence and identity.

The ROC retains rule over Taiwan Area which include main island of Taiwan, Penghu, Quemoy, Lienchiang, and other minor islands since early 1950s. Due to Taiwan's ambiguous political status, the ROC has participated in a number of international organizations under the name "Chinese Taipei". Under its One-China policy, the PRC holds that the ROC ceased to exist and that Taiwan is an inseparable part of the PRC despite the fact that it has never controlled the island. Moreover, the PRC refuses diplomatic relations with any country that recognizes the ROC.

== Chronology ==
=== Early postwar society ===
The Second World War's hostilities came to a close on 2 September 1945, with the defeat of the Empire of Japan and Nazi Germany. Taiwan, which had been ceded to Japan by the Treaty of Shimonoseki in 1895, was placed under the control of the Kuomintang-led Republic of China (ROC) by the promulgation of General Order No. 1 and the signing of the Instrument of Surrender on that day.

He Yingqin, the ROC representative at the Japanese surrender ceremonies, established the Office of the Chief Executive of Taiwan Province separate from the provincial-level executive system on mainland China. After the establishment of the provincial executive office, Chen Yi was appointed Chief Executive. Chen proclaimed 25 October to be Retrocession Day. However, because Japan had not formally relinquished the sovereignty of Taiwan at that time, Allies of World War II did not recognize the unilateral annexation of Taiwan by the Republic of China.

Chen Yi's administration was marred by corruption, as well as a lack of discipline in the military police assigned to occupation duties, resulting in a severe undermining of the chain of command. With the rampant corruption in his administration, Chen Yi began to monopolize power. In addition to this, the island's post-war economy was failing and headed into a recession, causing people on the island to endure economic hardship. The government's program of "De-Japanization" also created cultural estrangement, along with tensions between the growing population of migrants from the mainland and the pre-war residents of the island. The building tensions erupted in 1947, when the arrest of a cigarette vendor by government agents led to the death of a bystander. The clashes between police and residents that followed quickly spread across the island, and grew into a general rebellion against Chen Yi and the Chief Executive's Office in what came to be known as the February 28 incident. Several weeks later, government troops were sent to Taiwan from the mainland to handle the crisis and to suppress any opposition or resistance to the government. Many prominent individuals in Taiwanese society, as well as other residents of the island, many of whom had nothing to do with the incident, were either killed, imprisoned without trial, or simply disappeared. The February 28 Incident was a prelude to the White Terror of the 1950s, resulting in ethnic tensions between pre-war and post-war residents, as well as the genesis of the Taiwanese independence movement.

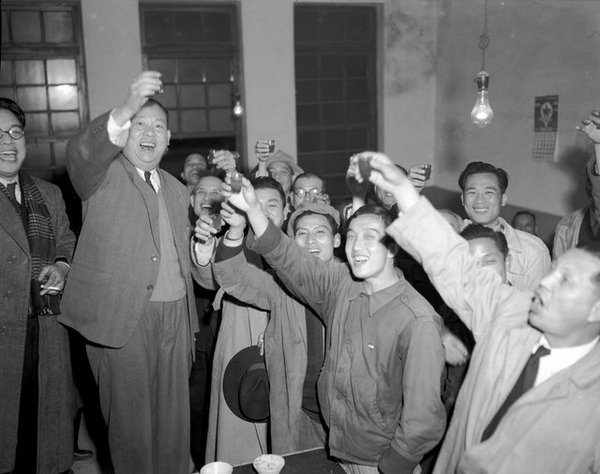
Non-Kuomintang Taiwanese politician Wu San-lien (2L) celebrated his landslide victory (65.5%) in the first-time election for mayor of Taipei in January 1951 with his supporters.

After the February 28 Incident, the Kuomintang-led ROC government reorganized the local government, abolishing the Chief Executive's Office, while establishing a new provincial government. Wey Daw-ming, whose parents were scholars, became the first Governor of Taiwan Province and, during his administration, reduced the scope of the public enterprises, which had grown significantly under Chen Yi.

Wey was succeeded as governor by Chen Cheng in 1949. Wey reformed the currency system, replacing the devalued Old Taiwan dollar with the New Taiwan dollar, at a 40,000:1 exchange rate, and implemented the 375 Rent Reduction Act, easing the inflationary situation.

The KMT viewed the population of Taiwan as corrupted by Japanese influence and neither fully Chinese or fully trustworthy. This perceived influence led the KMT to believe that the population of Taiwan was backwards and required re-education. The KMT sought to remove any trace of Japanese influence and to force a full Chinese identity on the people of Taiwan.

After Japan's surrender, most of Taiwan's approximately 300,000 Japanese residents were expelled. The KMT also seized properties from Japanese colonists either for sale or for their own use. In modern Taiwan these appropriated properties are considered ill-gotten assets. The KMT also took assets which had belonged to the Japanese colonial authorities. In 2017 a court ordered the KMT to pay compensation for 458 properties which had been expropriated in this way.

=== Authoritarianism, martial rule and cold war ===
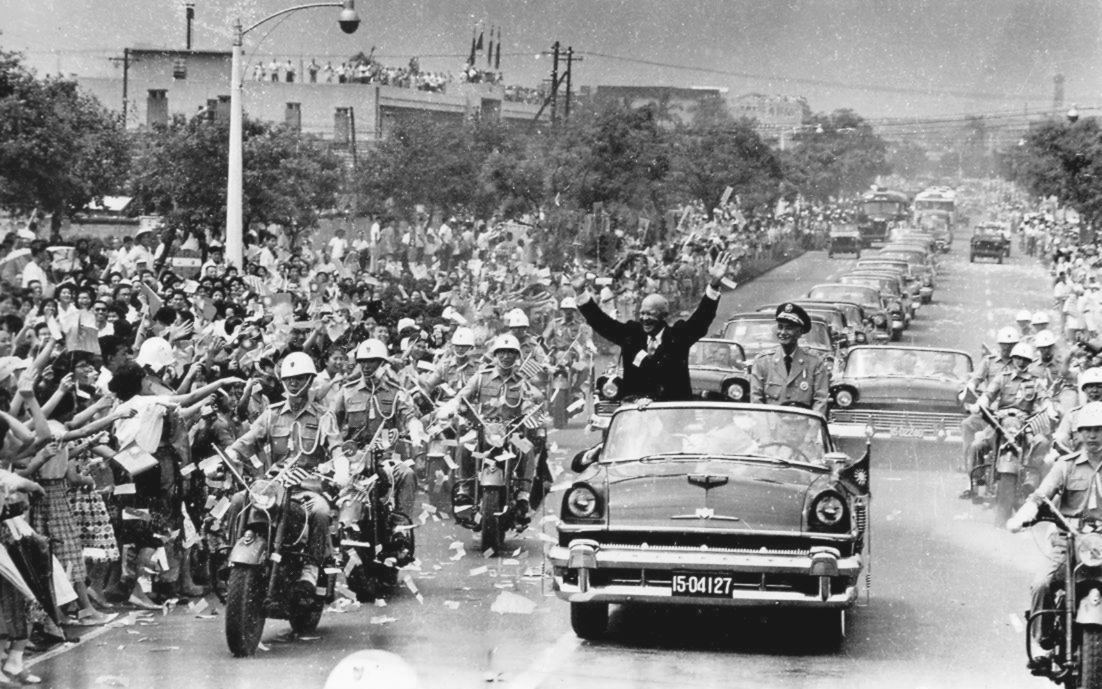
With President Chiang Kai-shek, U.S. President Dwight D. Eisenhower waved to crowds during his visit to Taipei, Taiwan in June 1960.

On 20 July 1946, Chiang Kai-shek launched a large-scale assault on CCP territory in Huabei with 113 brigades (a total of 1.6 million troops), starting a new phase of the Chinese Civil War. Chen Cheng, who served as the chairman of Taiwan Provincial Government and commander of Taiwan Garrison Command, declared martial law on the island on 19 May 1949. A part of the Republic of China, Taiwan inherited the international pronouncement of the ROC government including the 1932 Note Verbale to France, where China declared that its southernmost territory was the Paracels.

In December 1949, the Republic of China Armed Forces and the Kuomintang were defeated in the Chinese Civil War, forcing the Government of the Republic of China to relocate to Taiwan. This allowed the CCP to declare the establishment of a new Chinese state: the People's Republic of China.

Following their retreat to Taiwan the KMT viewed their retreat as a temporary one with Chiang Kai-shek saying "prepare for one year, counterattack in two years, sweep out the enemy in three years and succeed within five years." This led them to prioritize military armament and preparation over economic development.

After the February 28 Incident, the Nationalist government launched a campaign of suppression against political dissents. The KMT mostly imprisoned Taiwan's intellectual and social elite out of fear that they might resist their rule or sympathize with communism.

Up and until 1958, small-scale military campaigns between the ROC forces and the People's Liberation Army (PLA) were carried out across the strait. An attempt by the CCP government to take the ROC-controlled island of Quemoy was thwarted in October 1949, halting the PLA advance towards Taiwan.

In April 1950, amphibious operations were successful in conquering Hainan Island in April 1950, leading to the capture of Wanshan Islands off the Guangdong coast (May–August 1950) and Zhoushan Island off Zhejiang (May 1950).

This period of tension lasted until the Second Strait Crisis, in which the United States pledged to protect the island from the mainland. From that point on, both sides of the strait have ceased all major hostilities against each other, with the ROC Navy having resumed unilateral combat and escort duties while the US Navy secretly and quietly removed their extra warships from the Taiwan Strait.

=== Democratic reforms ===
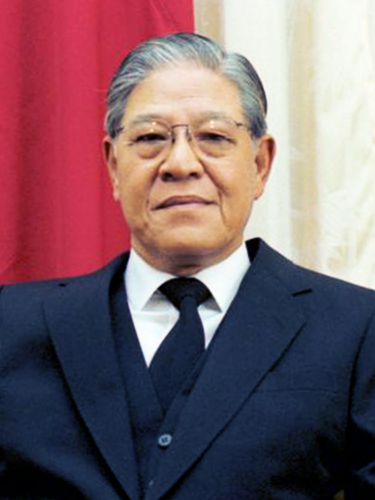
President Lee Teng-hui (served from 1988 to 2000) nicknamed "Mr. Democracy" for his dedication to the democratization of Taiwan.

The Republic of China entered into the development phase of constitutional democracy with the promulgation of the Constitution of the Republic of China in 1947. Subsequently, the National Revolutionary Army was also renamed as Republic of China Armed Forces and was nationalized. However, due to the Chinese Civil War, the Temporary Provisions Effective During the Period of Communist Rebellion were passed as an amendment to the Constitution of the Republic of China. This established martial law in Taiwan and curtailed civil liberties and democracy. The official rationale for the Provisions was the ongoing Chinese Civil War and ROC was effectively under the military rule of the KMT during the period of mobilization. Taiwan was effectively under martial law.

However, with the demise of the KMT single-party system and democratization movement during the 1980s, martial law was eventually lifted in 1987 (and its provisions were eventually rescinded in 1991). Constitutional democracy was restored in ROC after 1987.

When the Republic of China relocated to Taiwan in 1949, the Chinese Youth Party, China Democratic Socialist Party, and KMT were the only legal political parties in Taiwan. The other established parties operated under the Tangwai movement.

Until the early 1970s, the Republic of China was recognized as the sole legitimate government of China by the United Nations and most Western nations, which refused to recognize the People's Republic of China (PRC) on account of the Cold War. The KMT rule of Taiwan under martial law until the late 1980s had the stated goals of being vigilant against Communist infiltration and preparing to retake mainland China. Therefore, political dissent was not tolerated.

The late 1970s and early 1980s were a turbulent time for the Taiwan-born as many of the people who had originally been oppressed and left behind by economic changes became members of Taiwan's new middle class. Free enterprise had allowed native Taiwanese to gain a powerful bargaining chip in their demands for respect for their basic human rights. The Kaohsiung Incident would be a major turning point for democracy in Taiwan.

Taiwan also faced setbacks in the international sphere. In 1971, the ROC government walked out of the United Nations shortly before it recognized the PRC government in Beijing as the legitimate holder of China's seat in the United Nations. The ROC had been offered dual representation, but Chiang Kai-shek demanded to retain a seat on the UN Security Council, which was not acceptable to the PRC. Chiang expressed his decision in his famous "the sky is not big enough for two suns" speech. In October 1971, Resolution 2758 was passed by the UN General Assembly and "the representatives of Chiang Kai-shek" (and thus the ROC) were expelled from the UN and replaced as "China" by the PRC. In 1979, the United States switched recognition from Taipei to Beijing.

Chiang Kai-shek died in April 1975 at the age of 87, and was succeeded in the presidency by Yen Chia-kan while his son Chiang Ching-kuo succeeded to the leadership of the Kuomintang (opting to take the title "Chairman" rather than the elder Chiang's title of "Director-General"). Formerly the head of the feared secret police, Chiang Ching-kuo recognized gaining foreign support to securing the ROC's future security required reform. His administration saw a gradual loosening of political controls, a transition towards democracy, and moves toward Taiwanization of the regime. Opponents of the Nationalists were no longer forbidden to hold meetings or publish papers. Though opposition political parties were still illegal, when the Democratic Progressive Party was established as the first opposition party in 1986, President Chiang decided against dissolving the group or persecuting its leaders. Its candidates officially ran in elections as independents in the Tangwai movement. In the following year, Chiang ended martial law and allowed family visits to mainland China.

Chiang selected Lee Teng-hui, a Taiwan born technocrat to be his vice president, first in the line of succession to the presidency. The move followed other reforms giving more power to native-born citizens and calmed anti-KMT sentiments during a period in which many other Asian autocracies were being challenged.

After Chiang Ching-kuo died in 1988, his successor, President Lee Teng-hui, continued to democratize the government. Lee transferred more government authority to Taiwanese-born citizens, and Taiwan underwent a process of localization. In this localization process, local culture and history was promoted over a pan-China viewpoint. Lee's reforms included printing banknotes from the Central Bank instead of the usual Provincial Bank of Taiwan. He also largely suspended the operation of the Taiwan Provincial Government. In 1991 the Legislative Yuan and National Assembly, elected in 1947, were forced to resign. These groups were originally created to represent mainland China constituencies. Also lifted were the restrictions on the use of Taiwanese languages in the broadcast media and in schools. Lee Teng-hui believed that agriculture was the backbone of a nation and promoted it extensively. He implemented health insurance and occupational hazard insurance programs for farmers. He also emphasized the Japanese roots of much of Taiwan's agricultural infrastructure.

Attempting to maintain good relations with the PRC, Taiwan avoided any criticism of the Tiananmen Square Massacre and the media was largely barred from reporting on it. A group of students who attempted to sail a chartered ship into the Formosa Strait and beam pro-democracy broadcasts into China via amateur radio were foiled by the government by putting various obstacles in their way that caused them to abandon the attempt.

However, Lee failed to crack down on the massive corruption that pervaded the government and many KMT loyalists felt that Lee betrayed the ROC by taking reforms too far, while those in the opposition felt he did not take reforms far enough.

=== Democratic period ===
Lee ran as the incumbent in Taiwan's first direct presidential election in 1996 against DPP candidate and former dissident, Peng Min-ming. This election prompted the PRC to conduct a series of missile tests in the Taiwan Strait to intimidate the Taiwanese electorate so that electorates would vote for pro-unification candidates, Chen Li-an and Lin Yang-kang. The aggressive tactic prompted U.S. President Clinton to invoke the Taiwan Relations Act and dispatch two aircraft carrier battle groups into the region off Taiwan's southern coast to monitor the situation, and PRC's missile tests were forced to end earlier than planned. This incident is known as the 1996 Taiwan Straits Crisis.

One of Lee's final acts as president was to declare on German radio that the ROC and the PRC have a special state-to-state relationship. Lee's statement was met with the PLA conducting military drills in Fujian and a frightening island-wide blackout in Taiwan, causing many to fear an attack.

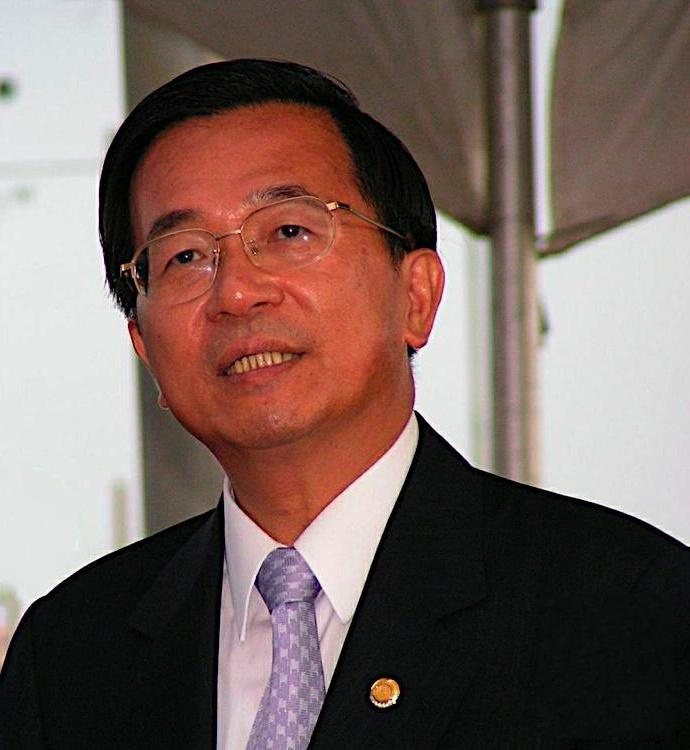
Chen Shui-bian was elected as the first non-KMT president of Taiwan in 2000

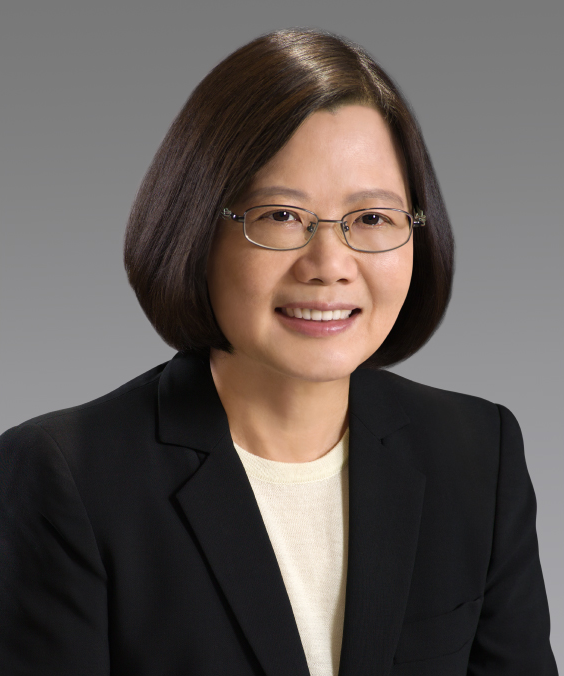
Tsai Ing-wen was the first female president of Taiwan, served from 2016 to 2024

The 2000 presidential election marked the end of the Kuomintang's status as the ruling party. The DPP candidate Chen Shui-bian was elected president with Annette Lu as vice-president, after a three-way race that saw the Pan-Blue vote split by independent James Soong (formerly of the Kuomintang) and Kuomintang candidate Lien Chan. Chen garnered 39% of the vote. After the election, Soong formed the People First Party (PFP).

In August 2002, President Chen openly indicated that the relationship between Taiwan and the mainland is "One Country on Each Side". This declaration led to disputations throughout Taiwan, in mainland China and in the United States. In 2004, the day before the 2004 presidential election, there was a supposed assassination attempt on President Chen and Vice-president Lu. They were re-elected the next day, although the Pan-Blue Coalition disputed the legality of the result due to the close margin of the election and the shooting incident. In 2005, an ad hoc National Assembly passed constitutional amendments ruling that elections for the Legislative Yuan change to use of parallel voting, aiding the formation of a two-party system. As a result of scandals in the DPP administration, on 9 September 2006, former chairperson of the DPP, Shih Ming-teh, led an anti-Chen Shui-bian campaign called the Million Voices Against Corruption, President Chen Must Go but did not achieve the desired result of President Chen's resignation.

The KMT also retained control of the legislature in the Legislative Yuan elections in January 2008. In the presidential election in May 2008, KMT candidate Ma Ying-jeou ran on a platform supporting friendlier relations with mainland China and economic reforms and defeated DPP candidate Frank Hsieh with 58.48% of the vote.

Ma was re-elected, and the KMT retained its majority in the Legislative Yuan, in combined elections in January 2012. In the 2016 elections, the DPP regained power with Tsai Ing-wen becoming Taiwan's first female president.

On 24 May 2017, the Constitutional Court ruled that same-sex couples have a right to marry, and gave the Legislature Yuan two years to adequately amend Taiwanese marriage laws. According to the court ruling, if amendments are not passed within two years, same-sex marriages will automatically become legal. In effect, Taiwan (ROC) became the first country in Asia and the first non-UN sovereign state to allow same-sex marriage in May 2019.

The local elections held on November 24, 2018, resulted in a major setback for the DPP majority and led to President Tsai Ing-wen resignation as leader of the party. The DPP lost a total of nine legislative seats, giving the KMT control of the majority of the 22 seats. KMT mayoral candidates won in New Taipei City, Taichung and Kaohsiung, the latter of which has been a political stronghold for the DPP for 20 years.

In May 2019, Taiwan became the first country in Asia to legalize same-sex marriage.

In January 2020, Tsai Ing-wen was re-elected in the presidential election. In the parliamentary election President Tsai's Democratic Progressive Party (DPP) won majority 61 out of 113 seats. The Kuomintang (KMT) won 38 seats.

The 2022 visit by Nancy Pelosi to Taiwan resulted in increased tensions between Taiwan and China while reinforcing US-Taiwan ties. In response to the trip the PLA conducted military exercises around Taiwan, included missile launches which overflew Taiwan.

In January 2024, William Lai Ching-te of the ruling Democratic Progressive Party won Taiwan's presidential elections. However, for the first time since 2004, no party won a majority in the simultaneous legislative election. Instead, 51 seats were secured by the Democratic Progressive Party (DPP), 52 seats by the Kuomintang (KMT), and the Taiwan People's Party (TPP) secured eight seats.

== Cross-straits relations and international position ==
At the end of 1943, the Cairo Declaration was issued, including among its clauses that all territories of China, including Formosa (Taiwan), that Japan had occupied would be returned to Republic of China. This declaration was reiterated in the Potsdam Declaration, issued in 1945. Later that year, World War II ended, and Japan accepted the Potsdam Declaration, surrendering unconditionally. The Supreme Commander of the Allied Forces commanded that the Japanese forces in Taiwan surrender to the government of the Republic of China, which acted as the representative of the Allied Forces. On 25 October 1945 in Taipei Zhongshan Hall, the Japanese government in Taiwan surrendered to the representative of the Republic of China, Chen Yi, the Republic of China formally receiving Taiwan. In 1951, Japan formally signed the Treaty of San Francisco, but, due to the unclear situation of the Chinese civil war, the peace treaty did not clearly indicate to whom Taiwan's sovereignty belonged. In the second article of the 1952 Treaty of Taipei, following the Treaty of San Francisco, Japan reiterated its abandonment of sovereignty of Taiwan, the Pescadores, the Spratlys and the Paracels.

The People's Republic of China (PRC) and the Republic of China (ROC) continued a state of war until 1979. In October 1949 a PRC attempt to take the ROC controlled island of Kinmen was thwarted in the Battle of Kuningtou halting the PLA advance towards Taiwan. The Communists' other amphibious operations of 1950 were more successful: they led to the Communist conquest of Hainan Island in April 1950, capture of Wanshan Islands off the Guangdong coast (May–August 1950) and of Zhoushan Island off Zhejiang (May 1950).

In June 1949 the ROC declared a "closure" of all mainland China ports and its navy attempted to intercept all foreign ships. The closure covered from a point north of the mouth of Min River in Fujian Province to the mouth of the Liao River in Manchuria. Since mainland China's railroad network was underdeveloped, north–south trade depended heavily on sea lanes. ROC naval activity also caused severe hardship for mainland China fishermen.

After losing mainland China, a group of approximately 12,000 KMT soldiers escaped to Burma and continued launching guerrilla attacks into south China. Their leader, General Li Mi, was paid a salary by the ROC government and given the nominal title of Governor of Yunnan. Initially, the United States supported these remnants and the Central Intelligence Agency provided them with aid. After the Burmese government appealed to the United Nations in 1953, the U.S. began pressuring the ROC to withdraw its loyalists. By the end of 1954, nearly 6,000 soldiers had left Burma and Li Mi declared his army disbanded. However, thousands remained, and the ROC continued to supply and command them, even secretly supplying reinforcements at times.

During the Korean War, some captured Communist Chinese soldiers, many of whom were originally KMT soldiers, were repatriated to Taiwan rather than mainland China. A KMT guerrilla force continued to operate cross-border raids into south-western China in the early 1950s. The ROC government launched a number of air bombing raids into key coastal cities of mainland China such as Shanghai.

Though viewed as a military liability by the United States, the ROC viewed its remaining islands in Fujian as vital for any future campaign to defeat the PRC and retake mainland China. On 3 September 1954, the First Taiwan Strait Crisis began when the PLA started shelling Quemoy and threatened to take the Dachen Islands. On 20 January 1955, the PLA took nearby Yijiangshan Island, with the entire ROC garrison of 720 troops killed or wounded defending the island. On January 24 of the same year, the United States Congress passed the Formosa Resolution authorizing the President to defend the ROC's offshore islands. The First Taiwan Straits crisis ended in March 1955 when the PLA ceased its bombardment. The crisis was brought to a close during the Bandung Conference.

The Second Taiwan Strait Crisis began on 23 August 1958 with air and naval engagements between the PRC and the ROC military forces, leading to intense artillery bombardment of Quemoy (by the PRC) and Amoy (by the ROC), and ended on November of the same year. PLA patrol boats blockaded the islands from ROC supply ships. Though the United States rejected Chiang Kai-shek's proposal to bomb mainland China artillery batteries, it quickly moved to supply fighter jets and anti-aircraft missiles to the ROC. It also provided amphibious assault ships to land supply, as a sunken ROC naval vessel was blocking the harbor. On September 7, the United States escorted a convoy of ROC supply ships and the PRC refrained from firing. On October 25, the PRC announced an "even-day ceasefire" — the PLA would only shell Quemoy on odd-numbered days.

Despite the end of the hostilities, the two sides have never signed any agreement or treaty to officially end the war.

After the 1950s, the "war" became more symbolic than real, represented by on-again, off-again artillery bombardment towards and from Kinmen. In later years, live shells were replaced with propaganda sheets. The bombardment finally ceased in 1979 after the establishment of diplomatic relations between the People's Republic of China and the United States.

During this period, movement of people and goods virtually ceased between PRC- and ROC-controlled territories. There were occasional defectors. One high-profile defector was Justin Yifu Lin, who swam across the Kinmen strait to mainland China and is now Chief Economist and Senior Vice President of the World Bank.

Most observers expected Chiang's government to eventually fall in response to a PRC invasion of Taiwan, and the United States initially showed no interest in supporting Chiang's government in its final stand. Things changed radically with the onset of the Korean War in June 1950. At this point, allowing a total Communist victory over Chiang became politically impossible in the United States, and President Harry S. Truman ordered the United States Seventh Fleet into the Taiwan Strait to prevent the ROC and PRC from attacking each other.

After the ROC complained to the United Nations against the Soviet Union supporting the PRC, the United Nations General Assembly Resolution 505 was adopted on 1 February 1952 to condemn the Soviet Union.

In 1987, the March 7 Incident (Lieyu massacre) in Lesser Kinmen cast a profound ripple on the cross-strait relation between China and Taiwan—4 months later on July 15, the martial law in Taiwan was lifted; and 5 months later on December 15, the ROC government began to allow visits to mainland China. This benefited many, especially old KMT soldiers, who had been separated from their family in mainland China for decades. This also proved a catalyst for the thawing of relations between the two sides. Problems engendered by increased contact necessitated a mechanism for regular negotiations.

In order to effect negotiations with mainland China on operational issues without compromising the government's position on denying the other side's legitimacy, the ROC government under Chiang Ching-kuo created the "Straits Exchange Foundation" (SEF), a nominally non-governmental institution directly led by the Mainland Affairs Council, an instrument of the Executive Yuan. The PRC responded to this initiative by setting up the Association for Relations Across the Taiwan Straits (ARATS), directly led by the Taiwan Affairs Office of the State Council. This system, described as "white gloves", allowed the two governments to engage with each other on a semi-official basis without compromising their respective sovereignty policies.

Led by highly respected elder statesmen Koo Chen-fu and Wang Daohan, the two organizations began a series of talks that culminated in the 1992 meetings, which, together with subsequent correspondence, established the 1992 Consensus, under which both sides agreed to deliberate ambiguity on questions of sovereignty, in order to engage on operational questions affecting both sides.

Also during this time, however, the rhetoric of ROC President Lee Tung-hui began to turn further towards Taiwan independence. Prior to the 1990s, the ROC had been a one-party authoritarian state committed to eventual reunification with mainland China. However, with democratic reforms the attitudes of the general public began to influence policy in Taiwan. As a result, the ROC government shifted away from its commitment to the One-China policy and towards a separate political identity for Taiwan. Jiang Zemin, General Secretary of the Chinese Communist Party, was also unwilling to compromise. Jiang notoriously attempted to influence the 1996 ROC election in Taiwan by conducting a missile exercise designed to intimidate Taiwanese voters and interfere with international shipping, leading to the Third Taiwan Strait Crisis. By 1998, semi-official talks had broken down.

Chen Shui-bian was elected President of the ROC in 2000. Politically, Chen is pro-Taiwan independence. Chen's repudiation of the 1992 Consensus combined with the PRC's insistence that the ROC agree to a "One China" principle for negotiations to occur prevented improvement in cross-strait relations.

Up until the 1970s, the international community generally considered the Kuomintang on Taiwan to be the legal representative of China, but acknowledgment of the nation of the People's Republic of China slowly increased. In 1954, the Republic of China and the United States signed the Mutual Defense Treaty between the United States of America and the Republic of China. In 1971, the United Nations acknowledged the People's Republic of China to be the sole legal representative of China (United Nations General Assembly Resolution 2758). The KMT government strengthened their "Han and the thief cannot both stand" (漢賊不兩立) stance and announced withdrawal from the United Nations. After this, the international position of the Republic of China slid to a large extent. In 1979, when the United States broke relations, it created an even more severe attack on the diplomatic plight of the ROC. In recent years, the ROC government has tried several times to apply anew to enter international organizations such as the United Nations and the World Health Organization, but, under the opposing side's powerful obstruction, there has been no success.

The question of the political status of Taiwan or whether the two sides are moving toward unification or seeking de jure independence is still unresolved. The assertion of the People's Republic of China both domestically and internationally is "Whether from the perspective of history, government or international law, Taiwan is an inseparable part of China. The political status of Taiwan is a Chinese domestic affair, and, under the premise of no hope for unification as well as certain other (conditions), (the Chinese government) does not abandon (the possibility of) the use of force to resolve it." Those persons promoting Taiwan independence feel that, because of the Treaty of San Francisco signed by Japan and the United States and the unclear indication of the handover of Taiwan's sovereignty (the status of Taiwan was not decided on), Taiwan's future direction should be decided upon by the people of Taiwan and that the People's Republic of China not be permitted to threaten the use of force.

On 14 March 2005, the National People's Congress of the People's Republic of China passed the Anti-Secession Law, making clear for the first time in legal form the One-China principle. Some people in Taiwan felt dissatisfied about this, and, on March 26, hundreds of thousands of people went to the streets of Taipei, participating in the 326 Protect Taiwan Demonstration, indicating their strong dissatisfaction with and protest of the law. Beginning on 26 April 2005, KMT, and various Pan-Blue political parties visited mainland China, creating an upsurge in the political dialogue between the two sides (see 2005 Pan-Blue visits to mainland China), but cross-straits relations are still full of uncertainty.

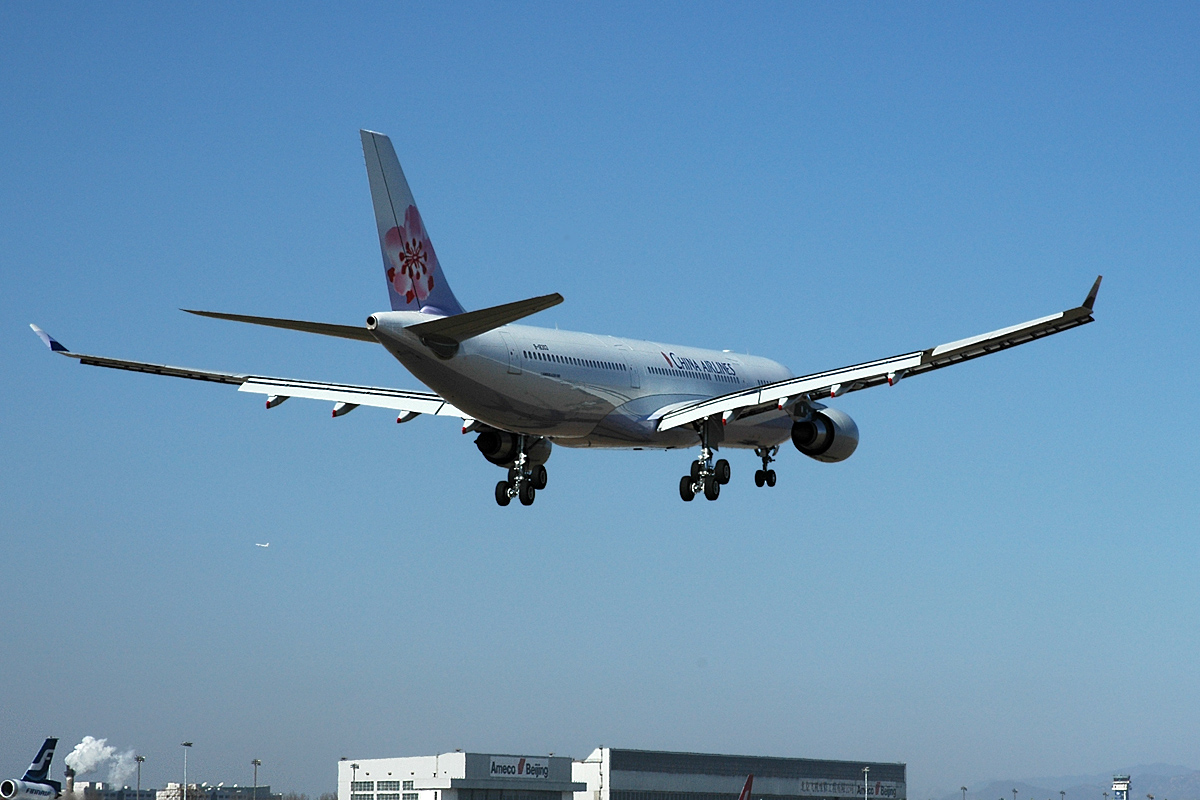
Flight CAL581, first direct TPE–PEK flight, also first direct flight between Mainland China and Taiwan, 29 January 2005.

Mainland China and Taiwan resumed regular weekend cross-strait charter direct flights on 4 July 2008, for the first time in six decades, as a "new start" in their tense relations. Liu Shaoyong, the China Southern Airlines chair, piloted the first flight from Guangzhou to the Taipei Songshan Airport. Simultaneously, a Taiwan-based China Airlines flew to Shanghai. A total of five mainland Chinese cities will be connected with eight Taiwan airports, with four days a week, 36 round-trip flights across the Taiwan Strait, thereby eliminating time-consuming Hong Kong stopovers.

On 7 November 2015, a meeting was held by ROC president Ma Ying-jeou and CCP General Secretary Xi Jinping in Singapore.

Recognition of the ROC has dwindled over the years. Recognition was withdrawn by The Gambia in 2013, São Tomé and Príncipe on 21 December 2016, Fiji in May 2017 (with unofficial relations from 1996 onwards), Panama on 13 June 2017, the Dominican Republic on 1 May 2018, Burkina Faso on 24 May 2018, El Salvador on 20 August 2018, Kiribati and the Solomon Islands in September 2019, Nicaragua in December 2021, Honduras in March 2023, and Nauru in January 2024. Only 11 UN member states (Guatemala, Belize, Eswatini, Haiti, Saint Kitts and Nevis, Saint Lucia, Saint Vincent and the Grenadines, Paraguay, Tuvalu, Marshall Islands and Palau) and the Holy See maintain relations with the ROC.

== Economic growth ==
During the post-war period, Taiwan was lacking in goods and materials, the economy was depressed, and inflation was severe. After the national government moved to Taiwan, agriculture was first to grow, and, in 1953, Taiwan's economy returned to its pre-war level. After this, the government pursued a policy of "Nurture industry with agriculture"(以農養工) on the foundation established during Japanese rule. With the capital, manpower, and skilled labor that was in Taiwan, American aid, etc., Taiwan's economy progressively moved toward rapid growth. In the 1950s, the government carried out an import substitution policy, taking what was obtained by agriculture to give support to the industrial sector, trading agricultural product exports for foreign currency to import industrial machinery, thus developing the industrial sector. The government raised tariffs, controlled foreign exchange and restricted imports in order to protect domestic industry. By the 1960s, Taiwan's import exchange industry was faced with the problem of saturating the domestic market. At the same time, the factories of some industrialized nations, because of rising wages and other reasons, slowly moved to certain areas that had both basic industry and low labor costs. Consequently, the economic policy of Taiwan changed to pursue export expansion. In 1960, the government enacted the "Regulations for Encouraging Investment", actively competing for foreign business investment in Taiwan. In 1966, the government established the Kaohsiung Export Processing Zone, Asia's first export processing zone, to expand the manufacturing production. In the role of a manufacturing relay station, Taiwan became a link in the international system of division of labor. In 1963, the proportion of Taiwan's economy occupied by industry exceeded that of agriculture. From 1968, Taiwan maintained two-digit long-term annual average economic growth up until the 1973 oil crisis. In 1971, Taiwan had a foreign trade surplus and continued from then on in an export state and a major producer of electronics goods.

After retreating to Taiwan, Chiang learned from his mistakes and failures in the mainland and blamed them for failing to pursue Sun Yat-sen's ideals of Tridemism and welfarism. Chiang's land reform more than doubled the land ownership of Taiwanese farmers. It removed the rent burdens on them, with former land owners using the government compensation to become the new capitalist class. He promoted a mixed economy of state and private ownership with economic planning. Chiang also promoted a 9-years compulsory education and the importance of science in Taiwanese education and values. These measures generated great success with consistent and strong growth and the stabilization of inflation.

== Sports ==
Football was introduced to Taiwan in 1916 by Edward Band who was the principal of Tainan's Chang Jung High School. The Chang Jung High School team is considered to be the first football team in Taiwan with all current teams being in some way descendant of it.

Following the Chinese Civil War the International Olympic Committee (IOC) recognized both the PRC and the ROC Olympic Committees in 1954. In 1958, The PRC withdrew its membership from the IOC and nine other international sports organizations in protest against the two-Chinas policy. After the withdrawal of the PRC, the IOC had been using a number of names in international Olympic activities to differentiate the ROC from the PRC. "Formosa" was used at the 1960 Summer Olympics, and "Taiwan" was used in 1964 and 1968. In 1975, the PRC applied to rejoin the IOC as the sole sports organization representing the whole China. The Taiwanese team, competing under the name of Republic of China at the previous Olympics, was refused to represent itself as the "Republic of China" or use "China" in its name by host Canadian government at the 1976 Summer Olympics. In April 1979, the IOC recognized the Olympic Committee of the PRC and maintained recognition of the Olympic Committee located in Taipei. In 1981, the ROC government formally accepted the name "Chinese Taipei".

== See also ==
- Han Taiwanese
- History of the People's Republic of China

== Notes ==
Preceded by Under Japanese rule 1895–1945	History of Taiwan; Under Republic of China rule 1945–present	Succeeded by –
