= Chang Teh-ming =

Taiwanese politician

- 張德銘

Member of the Legislative Yuan
- In office 1 February 1981 – 31 January 1984
- Constituency: Taiwan 2nd (Hsinchu County, Taoyuan City, Miaoli County)

Personal details
- Born: 1938 (age 87–88) Tōen, Shinchiku Prefecture, Taiwan, Empire of Japan (today Taoyuan City, Taiwan)
- Education: National Taiwan University (BA)

Chang Teh-ming (Chinese: 張德銘; pinyin: Zhāng Démíng; born 1938) is a Taiwanese politician.

== Life and career ==
Chang was born in present-day Taoyuan, Taiwan, and attended National Taiwan University. Considered a political moderate, he was active in the tangwai movement as a member of the Formosa faction. This confederation lent its name to the Formosa Magazine and later sparked the Kaohsiung Incident of 1979. He helped represent the activists who became known as the Kaohsiung Eight in court. In 1980, Chang won election to the Legislative Yuan. As a legislator, he visited the United States in July 1982, and was listed as one of the recipients of an open letter presented jointly by the World Federation of Taiwanese Associations and the Taiwanese Association of America. The letter was additionally addressed to Huang Huang-hsiung, Kang Ning-hsiang, and You Ching, reminding the delegation of government officials to pursue Taiwanese self-determination. Chang lost reelection in December 1983, and launched a successful campaign for Taipei City Council in 1985. While campaigning, Chang charged Cheng Nan-jung with libel. Chang later served on the Central Election Commission.
