= Zhongli incident =

1977 protest in Taiwan

Coordinates: 24°57′14.72″N 121°13′20.10″E

Zhongli Incident
- Traditional Chinese: 中壢事件
- Simplified Chinese: 中坜事件
Transcriptions
Standard Mandarin
- Hanyu Pinyin: Zhōnglì Shìjiàn

The Zhongli Incident or Chung-li Incident was a democracy movement in the Taiwanese town of Zhongli (now Zhongli District, Taoyuan City) in 1977, after a voter reported witnessing the Kuomintang rigging the election.

== Historical background ==
In the 1950s and 1960s, non-Kuomintang candidates could run for local positions in Taiwan, but were effectively barred from national or provincial posts because of a lack of resources and a government-controlled press that always supported the Kuomintang. In the 1970s, they began to coalesce into what came to be known as the Tangwai movement (literally "outside the party"), though martial law under the Kuomintang prevented the formation of a unified opposition party. The movement gained strength from the gradual emergence of a sense of Taiwanese identity and was emboldened by steps taken by Washington and Beijing toward normalization of diplomatic relations, undermining the Kuomintang's claim to be the legitimate government of all of China, including Taiwan. During local elections in 1977, the Kuomintang lost ground to Tangwai candidates.

== Incident ==
In 1977, the loose group of opposition candidates won 34% of the vote in the elections for the Taiwan Provincial Assembly. The growing opposition began to have an effect inside the Kuomintang. One popular figure, Hsu Hsin-liang, left the party and ran as a Tangwai for a local county magistrate's position in November 1977. Hsu Hsin-liang was an unpredictable political figure, a self-labeled "socialist", who wanted to maintain the Taiwanese economic base while humanizing its class structure. He vigorously advocated parliamentary democracy and Taiwan independence, and frequently attacked the state's political corruption and systematic violation of human rights. Hsu commonly spoke Hakka at public rallies, in defiance of the Kuomintang's insistence on Mandarin Chinese.

On election day, rumors began to circulate that a poll worker had destroyed ballots. Ballot vigilantes escorted the poll worker to the nearby police station, but he was quickly let go and continued to work at the polls. As more rumors of ballot rigging began to accumulate, the poll worker was accused of again destroying ballots. Policemen were called and formed a protective line. As the anger grew, protesters began to throw rocks and overturn police cars. At one point, a tear gas grenade was thrown, and two youths, Chiang Wen-kuo (江文國) and Chang Chi-ping (張治平), were said to have been shot dead by the police. By the end of the night, the protesters had burned down the police station.

The riot became known as the "Zhongli incident". It was the first mass political protest since the 1940s.

After the event, the regime's policy of riot control was to use police and military police for such purposes. The incident energized the opposition movement with hope.

A book was written called Long Live the Election (選舉萬歲) by Lin Cheng-chieh and Chang Fu-chung (張富忠).

== Legacy ==
Two years later (in December 1979) the Kuomintang arrested all of the leaders of the anti-Kuomintang movement who had organized a gathering in Kaohsiung on International Human Rights Day. The purge is known as the Kaohsiung Incident. The entire leadership was sentenced to long prison terms, including DPP politician Chen Chu, and Shih Ming-teh, labelled as Taiwan's Nelson Mandela, who was handed a life sentence. Shih was later released with the arrival of democracy.
