= Republic of China era =

Republic of China era may refer to:

- Republic of China (1912–1949), the Republic of China era of Chinese history
- History of Taiwan (1945–present), the Republic of China era of Taiwanese history
- Republic of China calendar
