= Kaohsiung Incident =

1979 crackdown on pro-democracy protesters in Taiwan

- Chinese: 高雄事件
Transcriptions
Standard Mandarin
- Hanyu Pinyin: Gāoxióng shìjiàn
Southern Min
- Hokkien POJ: Ko-hiông Sū-kiāⁿ

Formosa Incident
- Traditional Chinese: 美麗島事件
- Simplified Chinese: 美丽岛事件
Transcriptions
Standard Mandarin
- Hanyu Pinyin: Měilìdǎo shìjiàn
Southern Min
- Hokkien POJ: Bí-lē-tó Sū-kiāⁿ

The Kaohsiung Eight arrested. From left to right: Chang Chun-hung, Huang Hsin-chieh, Chen Chu, Yao Chia-wen, Shih Ming-teh, Annette Lu, Lin Hung-hsuan.

The Kaohsiung Incident, also known as the Formosa Incident, the Meilidao Incident, or the Formosa Magazine incident, was a crackdown on pro-democracy demonstrations that occurred in Kaohsiung, Taiwan, on 10 December 1979 during Taiwan's martial law period.

The incident occurred when Formosa Magazine, headed by released political prisoner Shih Ming-teh and veteran opposition legislator Huang Hsin-chieh, and other opposition politicians held a demonstration commemorating Human Rights Day to promote and demand democracy in Taiwan. At that time, the Republic of China was a one-party state under the Kuomintang, called Dang Guo, and the government used this protest as an excuse to arrest the main leaders of the political opposition.

The Kaohsiung Incident is widely regarded as a seminal event in the post-war history of Taiwan and the watershed of the Taiwan democratization movements. The event galvanized the Taiwanese community into political actions and is regarded as one of the events that eventually led to democracy in Taiwan.

== Background ==
From 1949 until the 1990s, Taiwan was effectively a one-party state under the rule of the Kuomintang (KMT). During the late 1970s many opponents of the KMT seeking democracy gradually organized themselves as an opposition camp, following the establishment of the magazine Taiwan Political Review by Kang Ning-hsiang in 1975. These opponents called themselves "Tangwai", literally meaning "outside the party". In its fifth edition on 27 December 1976 it published an article entitled "Two States of Mind – An Evening Discussion with Fou Cong and Professor Liou" which resulted in the revocation of the publisher's license. In the 1977 election, Tangwai expanded support significantly and won more seats than ever before. The outcome of the election demonstrated the potential of Tangwai as a quasi-opposition party to the ruling KMT and laid the ground for the ensuing mass movement.

On 16 December 1978, U.S. President Jimmy Carter announced that the U.S. would sever its official relationship with the Republic of China as of 1 January 1979. It was the most serious challenge to the Taiwan government since it lost its seat at the United Nations to the People's Republic of China in 1971. President Chiang Ching-kuo immediately postponed all elections without a definite deadline for its restoration. Tangwai, which had won steadily expanding support, was strongly frustrated and disappointed about Chiang's decision since it suspended the only legitimate method they could use to express their opinions.

Tangwai leader Huang Hsin-chieh and his comrades soon petitioned the KMT government for the restoration of elections, but were rebuffed. On 21 January 1979, the KMT arrested Yu Teng-fa, another Tangwai leader, and his son with the intentional false accusation of propagandising for the Chinese Communist Party. Tangwai regarded the arrest of Yu as a signal of complete suppression and decided to make a last-ditch effort by holding radical demonstrations on the street, resulting in the escalating conflict between the conservative KMT and Tangwai. On 20 April, the government impeached Magistrate Hsu Hsin-liang for participating in the historical first democratic rally in the Martial law period.

In May 1979, Formosa Magazine was established by Huang Hsin-chieh with Hsu as the director aiming at consolidating Tangwai membership. On 16 August 1979, the first edition was published under the title "Joint Promotion of the New Generation's Political Movements". The initial issue sold out all of its 25,000 copies, the second and third issues sold almost 100,000 copies, and the fourth issue sold more than 110,000. Nonetheless, Hsu's magistracy position was revoked by the government in 29 June, and he went into exile in the U.S. on 30 September. On 17 October 1979, a meeting of 22 Kuomintang security agencies adopted a proposal to ban the magazine after a protest from the South Korean Embassy over an article in the second issue titled "Unveil the Myth of the Korean Economic Miracle" (揭發韓國經濟奇蹟的神話). In November and early December, the southern command of Taiwan Garrison Command abetted 6 cases of local mafia members smashing the offices of Formosa Magazine and Huang's residence in Taipei, Kaohsiung, and Pingtung with one employee injured by axe, allegedly by Lieutenant General Chang Chih-hsiu (Chinese: 常持琇中將). Tangwai held many public gatherings and protests, without official permission. The KMT response was limited, such as sending police in riot gear but not suppressing the gatherings. This low-level reaction gave Tangwai confidence in its own power and it stuck to the radical approach.

== Gushan Incident ==
The magazine's Kaohsiung service center applied for a permit to hold a human rights forum on 10 December 1979 at an indoor stadium, and after that was denied it applied for a permit to hold the event at the Rotary Park (扶輪公園), which was also denied. In response, it was decided to hold the demonstration at the Kaohsiung headquarters.

On 9 December 1979, the Kaohsiung branch of Formosa Magazine dispatched two campaign wagons to broadcast the "Human Rights Forum". The wagons were held up by police and two volunteers were arrested and beaten, which roused Tangwai and its supporters to protest at the Gushan branch of Public Security Bureau. This incident caused many outraged Tangwai members and supporters who had not planned to attend the forum the next day to do so.

The event on 10 December 1979 started out as the first major Human Rights Day celebration on the island. Until that time the authorities had never allowed any public expression of discontent.

Between 2:00 and 3:00 p.m. that afternoon (four hours before the demonstration commemorating Human Rights Day started, and before any irregularities had taken place), the military police, the army, and the police had already taken up positions when the demonstrators arrived.

When the event took place during the evening, the military police marched forward and closed in on the demonstrators, then they retreated again to their original position. This was repeated two or more times. The battalion commander explained that the purpose of this exercise was to cause panic and fear in the crowd and also to provoke anger and confusion. Political demonstrators clashed with troops sent by the KMT.

== Arrests and imprisonment ==
The KMT authorities used the incident as an excuse to arrest virtually all well-known opposition leaders. They were held incommunicado for some two months, during which reports of severe ill-treatment filtered out of the prisons. The arrested groups were subsequently tried in three separate groups.

=== Lin family massacre ===
In February 1980, Lin Yi-hsiung, a leader of the democratic movement, was in detention and beaten severely by KMT police. His wife, Fang Su-min, saw him in prison and contacted the Amnesty International Osaka office. The next day, Lin's mother and twin 7-year-old daughters were stabbed to death in his home, while his oldest daughter was badly wounded. The authorities claimed to know nothing about it, even though his house was under 24-hour police surveillance.

=== Major groups ===
In March–April 1980, the eight most prominent leaders "The Kaohsiung Eight" were tried in military court and were sentenced to terms ranging from 12 years to life imprisonment. The trial was also publicized.

In April–May 1980, another group of 33 people, "The Kaohsiung 33", who had taken part in the Human Rights Day gathering were tried in civil court and sentenced to terms ranging from two to six years.

=== Others ===
A third group of 10 people were associated with the Presbyterian Church for hiding Shih Ming-teh, who feared torture and immediate execution. Most prominent among this group was Kao Chun-ming, the general-secretary of the Presbyterian Church. Kao was sentenced to seven years imprisonment. The others received lesser sentences. Shih was given a life sentence, and his wife, Linda Gail Arrigo, a United States citizen, was deported.

Fifteen of Taiwan's most important political leaders, writers and intellectuals, all associated with the Formosa Magazine, were arrested. Fifteen publications were closed down, including Meilidao (Formosa Magazine). After the event, newspapers reported that the ensuing confrontations led to civilian and police injuries.

After the incident, four Tangwai participants were arrested and imprisoned on trumped-up charges of sedition, including Huang Hsin-chieh, Yao Chia-wen, Chang Chun-hung and Lin Hung-hsuan.

== News reports ==
Mainstream media had long been controlled by the authoritarian KMT government. The contemporary domestic newspapers were biased about the Kaohsiung Incident and framed it as a violent mass event. China Times, United Daily News, and KMT-owned Central District News also incorrectly stated that the Tangwai protesters were motivated by a pro-independence mindset. It also stated that they were working to subvert the Republic of China in cooperation with the Chinese Communist Party. Such news reports caused negative public opinion. This negative public opinion was used by the media as further proof to attack and condemn the Tangwai.

The incident caused international attention around the world, which pressed the KMT government to hold an open trial on the accused. Even though there were pressures from the U.S. and reports from the international media such as New York Times, the mainstream Taiwanese media refuted what the larger international media reported as biased rumors regarding the incident.

== Legacy ==
The time period experienced a rising middle class, and a more open-minded Kuomintang (KMT) ruling regime that allowed some fostering of political opposition. Taiwanese citizens were becoming weary of mainlander authority, and were eager for a more democratic society. The event turned into a series of political protests that led to public trials and arrests. It is considered a turning point for pro-democracy groups/anti-KMT political opposition.

After the Kaohsiung incident, a decade of political struggle continued between the mainlander-controlled KMT and the other political parties. The importance of the incident is that both Taiwanese people in Taiwan as well as the overseas Taiwanese community were galvanized into political actions. The movement which grew out of the incident formed the basis for the present-day governing Democratic Progressive Party. While political opposition at the time was not yet calling for Taiwanese independence, the event called for self-determination. An overseas support network of Taiwanese organizations was also formed in North America and Europe. Virtually all leading members of the present-day democratic government had a role in the event, either as defendants or as defense lawyers. By 2000, DPP successfully ended KMT rule. After losing the 2008 and 2012 presidential and legislative elections to the KMT, the DPP successfully contested and won both elections in 2016.

Chen Shui-bian, who was later elected to two terms as ROC president, was one of the defence lawyers, while his running mate, Annette Lu, was one of the "Kaohsiung Eight". She was sentenced to 12 years, of which she served five and a half.

== See also ==
- Anti anti-communism – Opposition to anti-communism as applied in the Cold War
- White Terror (Taiwan)
- Martial law in Taiwan
- February 28 Incident
- Jing-Mei White Terror Memorial Park
- 2021 arrests of Hong Kong pro-democracy primaries participants
