= Million Voices Against Corruption, President Chen Must Go =

Taiwanese campaign for Chen Shui-bian's resignation

"Million Voices against Corruption, President Chen Must Go" Campaign logo, with "DEPOSE" slogan

Million Voices against Corruption, President Chen Must Go (百萬人民反貪腐倒扁運動) was a Taiwanese campaign led by former Chairman Shih Ming-teh of the Democratic Progressive Party to pressure then-President Chen Shui-bian to resign in 2006.

== Background ==
Taiwan's political scene is divided into two major groups. On one side are the pan-Blues, consisting of the Chinese Nationalist Party (Kuomintang, or KMT) and two spin-off parties, the People First Party (PFP), and the New Party. Facing them are the pan-Greens, led by the Democratic Progressive Party (DPP), and its ally the Taiwan Solidarity Union (TSU). Since the accession of Chen Shui-bian of the DPP to the Presidency in 2000, the Blue-controlled legislature had struggled to oust him, making changes to the impeachment process early in his administration, and attempting to recall him several times.

The latest round of recalls by the Blue side began in the summer of 2006, following a series of accusations of corruption against Chen and members of the first family. Allegations include insider trading by Chen's son-in-law, buying and selling of shares, and improper use of government funds. The recall motion was defeated due to a lack of votes.

Chen has denied any wrongdoing and not been found guilty by the Taiwanese judicial system. But his approval ratings fell, though the polls that show this is either from pro-Blue news media (which put him at about ~20%) or of completely unsupportable methodology, such as the notorious TSU poll that had him at just 5.8%. Hence, the actual extent of the decline is unknown. There have been calls from within his own party calling for his resignation, since there was some fear among the Greens that the scandals will affect the legislative election and the Presidential election in 2008.

The "Million Voices Against Corruption" campaign began in August 2006 when former DPP chairman and long-time democracy and independence activist Shih Ming-te announced that he would launch a protest campaign to force the President to resign. Shih had stepped down as chairman of the DPP in 1995, and began a long political drift from the Green side over to the Blue. According to his own version, he left the DPP in 1999, though party members said they kicked him out in 2000, blaming his grandstanding and repeated public attacks on his colleagues. In 2001 he became convener of a local pro-Blue thinktank called the Mountain Alliance, along with two other DPP turncoats, Sisy Chen and Hsu Hsin-liang. He ran unsuccessfully for mayor of Kaohsiung, garnering 1% of the vote, and also lost legislative elections in Taipei, both times running against DPP candidates. Shih's political career appeared to be in eclipse. Several years passed.

In August 2006 Shih came back to prominence. During questioning at the Presidential Office on the afternoon of 7 August 2006, the president detailed to the prosecutor how he spent the fund and presented relevant receipts and bank remittance statements. On the same day, Shih Ming-te, a former ally of Chen, wrote a letter to Chen urging him to resign from office and to admit wrongdoing so as to "set a good example for the Taiwanese people". The proposal was rejected. On August 8 Shih announced his intention to open a bank account and collect NT$100 from supporters, which would be used to fund a protest in Taipei aimed at ousting the President.

== Preparations ==
On 10 August 2006, Shih Ming-te began to plan the "Million Voices against Corruption, President Chen Must Go" campaign. Shih offered to lead the Taiwanese people in street demonstrations if he were able to raise at least 100,000,000 New Taiwan Dollars (NTD) in fundraising for his campaign.

In the meantime the Pan-Green supporters criticized the actions of Shih Ming-Te. Initially they recovered letters from his past begging the government for mercy when he was a political prisoner, but such tactics were widely seen as unseemly. More effective was that Shih, supposedly battling against corruption, had personal connections to former Tuntex Group chairman Chen Yu-hao, one of the island's most famous embezzlers, a connection that Shih boasts of. Chen Yu-hao is widely known to be strongly opposed to President Chen. The Greens also raised questions about Shih's own finances, and made allegations that Shih was a tool of the People's Republic of China. Security agencies found no connections, however.

Shih Ming-te called for various prominent Taiwanese (Republic of China) politicians to join in demonstrating for the resignation of Chen Shui-bian. However, although the demonstration was attended by all the major Blue politicians, no prominent Green politicians appeared.

== Demonstrations ==
=== Early sit-in protests ===
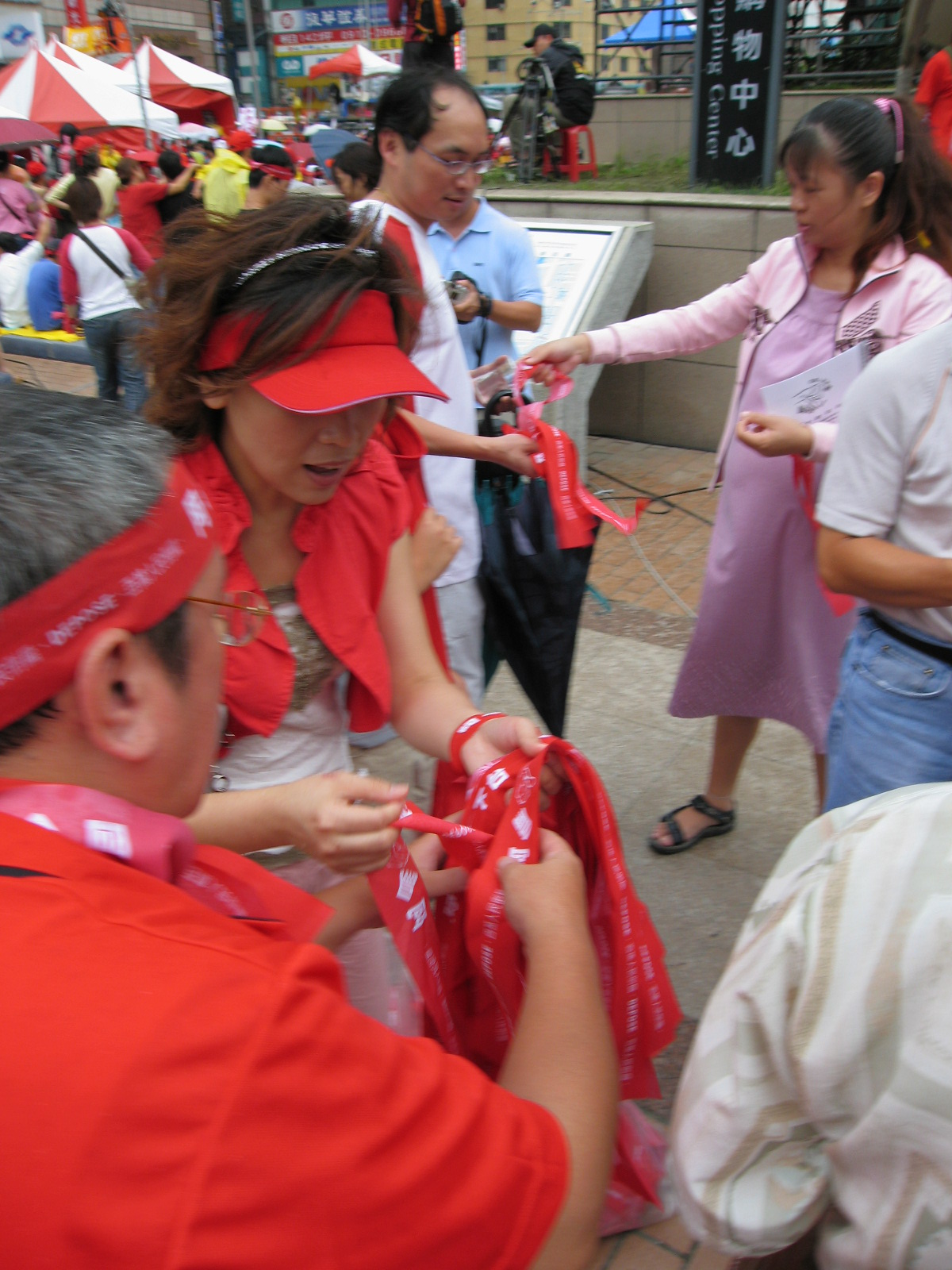
A volunteer of the protest helping to hand out red ribbons to other protesters on 16 September 2006

On 9 September 2006, the demonstration began as a gathering in front of the presidential office. Demonstrators were organized into the shape of a compass (as viewed from the sky) to symbolize the protesters' demands for integrity within government. Free meals were offered to the demonstrators by the organizers, and various events were held, including performances by children reciting Daxue, an ancient Chinese text by Confucius and his followers. Organizers estimated the number of participants to be around 300,000 at the start of the campaign (the police estimated the number to be closer to 90,000). Demonstrators were dressed in red as a sign of anger, gestured thumbs-down as a sign of disapproval, and chanted "Ah-Bian, step down! Ah-Bian, step down!" (Chinese: 「阿扁，下台！」) as they marched through downtown Taipei.

Various pro-Blue national celebrities and pan-Blue politicians (current and former) took part in the event. Demonstrators consist of Taiwanese (ROC) citizens and foreign nationals of all age groups, including students from various international schools located in Taipei and a number of Japanese-immigrated ROC expatriates. However, as numerous sources pointed out, the bulk of Shih's followers were not disappointed moderates from across the political spectrum, as campaign planners claimed, but longtime Blues. Shih himself would later concede this in an interview published in the New York Times on Sept. 28, 2006.

=== The "Surround the City" protest ===
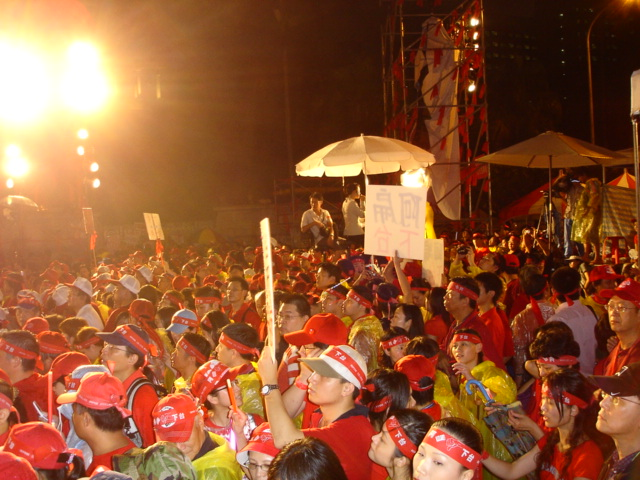
The "surround the city" protest march on 15 September 2006

On the night of 15 September 2006, demonstrators organized an effort to "surround the city" (Chinese: 圍城; pinyin: Weíchéng) with people holding glowsticks (especially red ones), in order to "block" Chen from leaving the city, as well as to relocate the demonstrations from its original location near the presidential office to Taipei Main Station. The event proved successful despite the inclement weather. Demonstrators in red shirts held glowsticks as they marched from Gongyuan Road to the station, filling the entire road.

MRT officials announced that additional trains would run until 1 A.M. The next day, the Taipei Rapid Transit Corporation announced a new record of 1.51 million passengers passing in and out of the stations during the night of the protest. The Main Station became the most popular public resting place for the protesters past midnight because of its proximity to the protest center as well as conveniences the station provides, including shelter, food, and hygiene facilities. Critics of the demonstrations pointed out that the protests increased MRT ridership congestions, as the daily commuters must cope with the additional riders. In addition, the protests caused havoc on Taipei's already congested traffic, and the cost of the protests has become burdensome for the city's residents.

=== The "Surround the Island" protest ===
After the 15 September 2006 demonstrations, Shih led a team of people through every major city in Taiwan (Chinese: 環島遍地開花; pinyin: Huándaǒ Biàndì Kāihuā) using tour buses to join local demonstrations. Organizers claim that anti-Chen protests occurred every day in October. The protests were mainly peaceful. Nonetheless, minor incidents of violence erupted when the protesters entered the Pan-Green leaning regions of southern Taiwan.

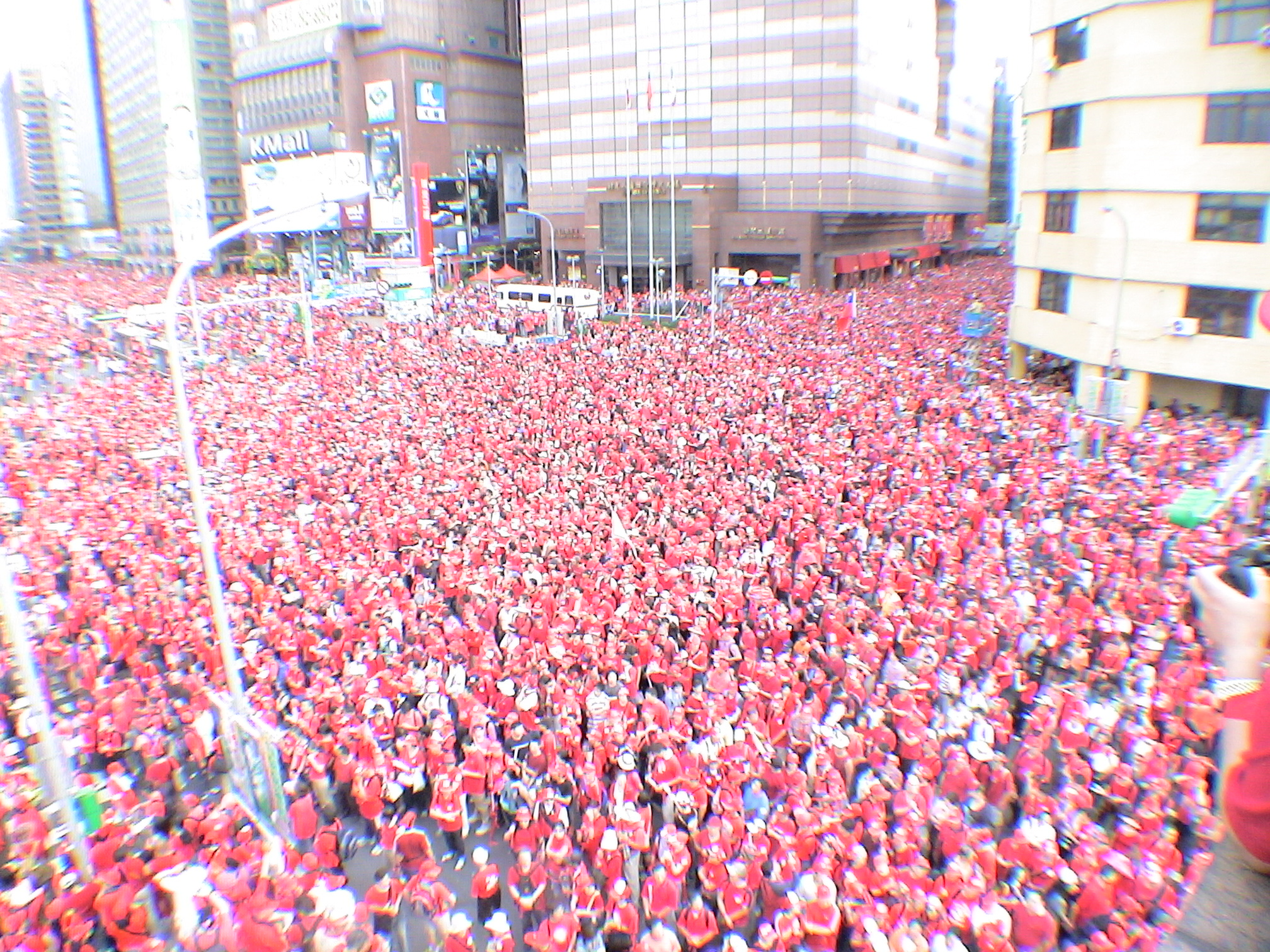
The "Besiege the Presidential Office" demonstration on 10 October 2006

=== The "Besiege the Presidential Office" demonstration ===
On 10 October 2006, ROC (Taiwan)'s National Day, the protesters returned to Ketagalan Avenue for another "Besiege the Presidential Office" demonstration (Chinese: 天下圍攻; pinyin: Tiānxià Weígōng, a play on the phrase “天下為公“) without first seeking demonstration permits from the police. Chen was heckled by opposition legislators of the Pan-Blue Coalition during a state ceremony attended by foreign dignitaries. There were also isolated, minor incidents of violence, including fist fights between Pan-Blue and Pan-Green legislators. In response, President Chen threatened to cancel the National Day celebration for 2007 because "everyone has different opinions and doesn't care". Chen also stated his commitment to clean politics and his intolerance of governmental corruption. After the ceremony, the government criticized the demonstrators, characterizing the demonstrations as disrespectful and illegal. Notably, while attending the ceremony, the AIT (American Institute in Taiwan) top official (and de facto United States ambassador) asked the protesters "to maintain politeness". Demonstrators claim that the guards protecting and surrounding the office wore red underwear underneath their uniforms, signifying solidarity with the protesters, though they could not display the color on their guard uniforms.

== Aftermath ==
Shih, a former political prisoner, has vowed to demonstrate indefinitely outside the presidential office, even until March 2008, when Taiwan (Republic of China) is due to hold the next presidential election, or until Chen, also a former political prisoner, resigns. However, in December 2006 Shih went back on this pledge, instead retiring to an apartment near the train station and promising to remain there until Chen's term was over.

On 14 October 2006, the Taipei Police repealed Shih's petition for further protest on Ketagalan Avenue because the protests on 10 October 2006 had violated the city law. Afterward, Shih agreed to shrink the size of their demonstration before planning another massive campaign.

The anti-Chen campaign achieved its intended effect of ousting the DPP from power, and returning the former Kuomintang to power. The efforts of the Pan-Blue red shirts have been widely praised by Chinese government media and various media outlets controlled by the Chinese Communist Party.

=== Indictment of President Chen's wife ===
On 3 November 2006, Chen's wife Wu Shu-chen and three other high-ranking officials of the Presidential Office were indicted of forgery and embezzlement of NTD 14.8 million (US$450,000) of government funds using faked documents. Due to the protection from the Constitution against prosecution of the sitting president, Chen could not be prosecuted until he left office, and he was not indicted, but was alleged to be an accomplice on his wife's indictment.

The prosecutor of the case has indicated that once Chen leaves office, his office will start the procedures to press charges against Chen. His wife Wu becomes the first sitting First Lady of the Republic of China to face criminal charges since the foundation of the Republic in 1911.

The indictment filed by prosecutors states that the indicted persons obtained government funds earmarked for secret foreign affairs, yet of six supposed secret diplomatic missions, there was sufficient evidence presented for only two. Of the remaining four, it was concluded that one did not exist, and in the case of the other three, the invoices presented were not found to be related to the secret missions.

The Pan-Blue coalition, after receiving the news, demanded to call for another recall motion unless Chen resigned immediately. Another small party that backed Chen previously, Taiwan Solidarity Union, founded by former KMT Chairman and ROC President Lee Teng-hui, said Friday they would likely to support the upcoming recall measure. However, the TSU said it would only support the new recall motion if "concrete evidence concerning corruption is presented." If the recall passed, it would be up to the voters to decide Chen's fate in an island-wide referendum.

Leaders of the Democratic Progressive Party met together on Friday to discuss the unfavorable charges. The meeting ended when party leaders demanded Chen to explain the accusation within three days. There has long been rumbles inside the DPP that Chen has become their liability and that they should recall him before the presidential election. If Chen resigned, he would be the first Taiwanese president to step down and the outspoken vice president Annette Lu would likely take power.

After the prosecutor announced the indictment news, the campaign leader Shih proclaimed in a rally in Friday that the indictment was the historical high point in Taiwan and the month long campaign was a success. Then, Shih led the protesters back to Ketagalan Boulevard for more sit-in demonstrations.

In a press conference 5 November 2006, Chen rebutted the charges against his wife and members of his presidential office. He said that Taiwan government offices advised him to prepare the receipts in such a fashion, and that after 6 years of doing so, it is strange that they would never mention an irregularity if it wasn't the right way to do it. He promised that all of the money actually went to diplomatic missions and did not go into any private pockets. Furthermore, he mentioned that when he took office, he thought his salary was so excessive that he cut his own salary in half, and that reduction is more than the amount he is accused of embezzling, so there is no need for him to take those money. In addition, he said that if the charges against his wife were proven in a court of law just as they were charged, then he would at that time step down as President of the Republic of China.

The First Lady claimed to have fainted during a press conference, and is currently staying in the NTU Hospital. However, many dispute that Wu truly lost consciousness, as she grabbed a bodyguard after she collapsed.

=== Anniversary ===
On 9 September 2007, thousand of protesters gathered at Ketagalan Boulevard to mark the one-year anniversary of the campaign. More than 1000 police officers were deployed, but no clashes were reported in the candle-lit vigil. Campaign leader Shih Ming-teh also appeared at the vigil to address the crowd. He reassured that their persistence would pay off.

== International and English-language media ==
- 24 August 2006, BBC News reported statements made by Taiwan's Foreign Minister James Huang, voicing his concern over statements made by pro-KMT diplomats within Taiwan's Foreign Ministry. Due to Taiwan's extremely challenged political condition, Huang felt statements made by red shirt supporters within the Foreign Ministry would undermine the island nation's effort to establish diplomatic ties with countries in Latin America.
- 24 August 2006, AFX Media reports Taipei Shares had been severely affected by the social chaos unleashed by the renewed effort by Shih Ming-teh and the pro-KMT red shirts to depose Chen Shui-Bian. Foreign investors were net sellers of shares worth 2.48 bln twd, Taiwan investment trusts net buyers of 65.53 mln twd-worth and brokers net sellers of 517.07 mln twd-worth. The sit-ins and disruption to Taipei city cast a shadow over the islands future.
- 9 September 2006, CNN reports on the "DEPOSE" campaign. CNN estimates the number of participants to be between 30,000 and 50,000.
- 16 September 2006, Agency France Press reports on the strong showing of support from over 200,000 Chen supporters, to counter the red shirt movement. AFP reported that Chen was elected as the head of state governing the island of Taiwan after 50 years of Kuomintang dictatorship. The corruption case against case motivated thousands of KMT supporters to urge the return of the former authoritarian party to power.
- 2 October 2006, South China Morning Post reported most Taiwanese TV outlets, the majority of which are controlled by the Pan-Blue coalition, are biased in favor of red shirt demonstrators. On September 25, Kuomintang Chairman Ma Ying-Jeou called on the then ruling Chen's government to hold a referendum to oust Chen.
- 3 October 2006, English language China Post reported that conservative political exile, Cao Changqing, likened Taiwan's red shirt movement to the red guard movement unleashed by Mao Zedong in 1966 which led to the deaths of numerous Chinese citizens.
- On 17 May 2010, the Wall Street Journal compared the outcome of anti-incumbent demonstrations in Thailand, Taiwan, and South Korea, urging the Thai Prime Minister to follow the examples of Roh Tae Woo and Chen Shui Bian to back down to allow a less disruptive transition of power by respecting the democratic process.
