= Huang Hsin-chieh =

Taiwanese politician (1938–1999)

Huang Hsin-chieh MLY
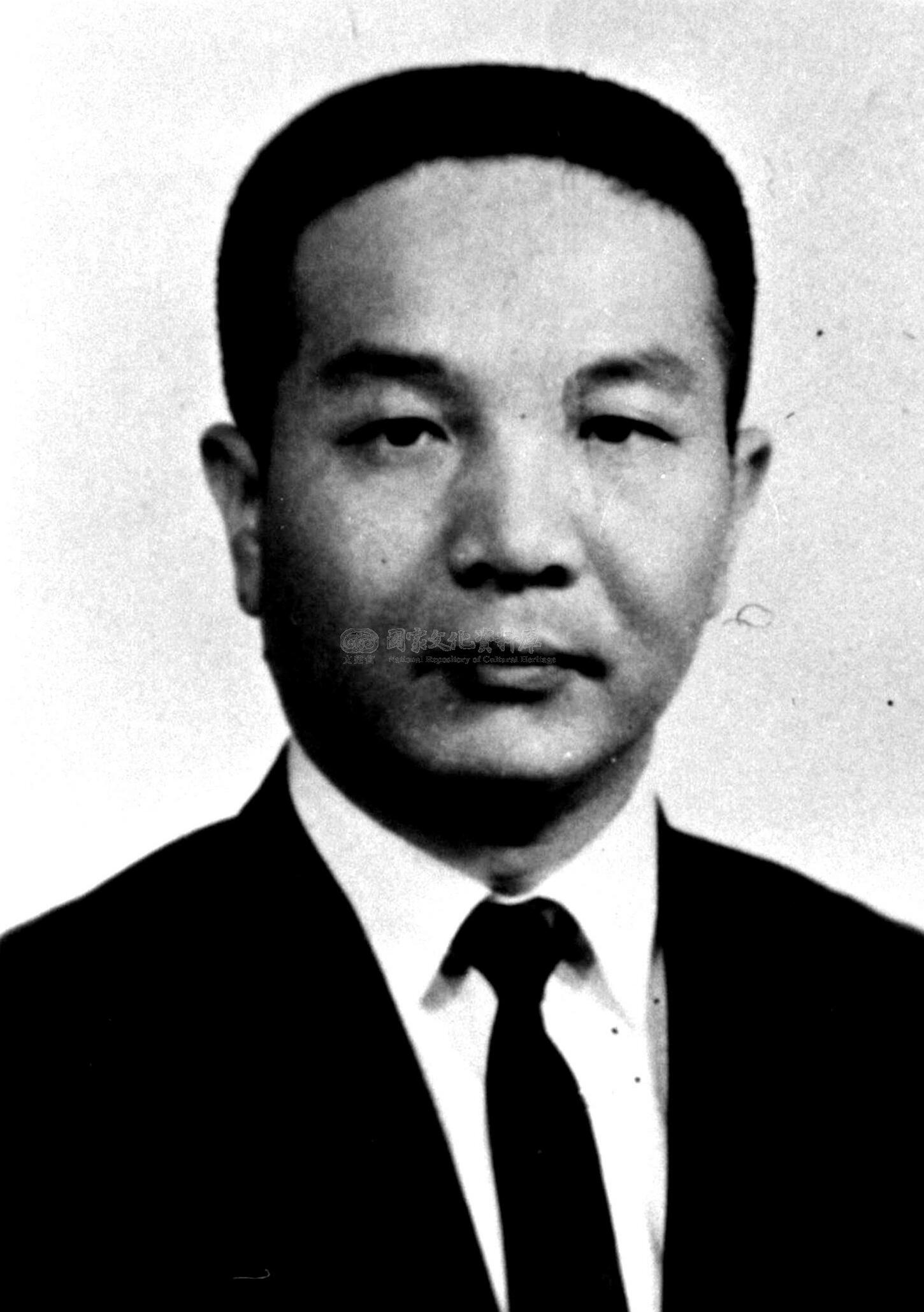

3rd Chairperson of the DPP
- In office October 30, 1988 – January 20, 1992
- Preceded by: Yao Chia-wen
- Succeeded by: Hsu Hsin-liang

Member of the Legislative Yuan
- In office February 1, 1969 – December 31, 1991

Personal details
- Born: August 20, 1928 Dairyūdōchō, Taihoku City, Taihoku Prefecture, Japanese Taiwan (modern-day Taipei, Taiwan)
- Died: 30 November 1999 (aged 71) Taipei, Taiwan
- Resting place: Bali, Taipei
- Party: Democratic Progressive Party
- Spouse: Chang Yueh-ching
- Relatives: Huang Tien-fu (brother); Lan Mei-chin (sister in-law)
- Education: National Taipei University (LLB)

Huang Hsin-chieh
- Traditional Chinese: 黃信介
- Simplified Chinese: 黃信介
Transcriptions
Standard Mandarin
- Hanyu Pinyin: Huáng Xìnjiè
- Wade–Giles: Huang Hsin-chieh
Southern Min
- Hokkien POJ: N̂g Sìn-kài

Huang Hsin-chieh (Chinese: 黃信介; 20 August 1928 – 30 November 1999) was a Taiwanese politician, Taipei city council member, National Assembly representative, Legislative Yuan legislator, publisher of Formosa Magazine and Taiwan Political Theory magazine (台灣政論), senior Dangwai Leader, third chairperson of the Democratic Progressive Party (DPP), and senior adviser to the president of the Republic of China. He was born on August 20, 1928, during the period when Taiwan was under Japanese governance also known to the Japanese as the Japan governance period of Taiwan and was fluent in Japanese and Taiwanese. He married Chang Yueh-ching (張月卿) in 1954 and had four children and adopted sons. They lived in a modest residence on Chongqing N. Rd in Datong District, Taipei City for over three decades.

On November 30, 1999, he died of a heart attack in Taipei at the age of 71. He was buried in Bali District,

President Lee Teng-hui on January 18, 2000, awarded Huang Hsin-chieh the posthumous citation for activities to promote political reform, nation building, and democracy advancement.

Lee's successor Chen Shui-bian established a memorial lecture at the Ketagalan Institute in Huang Hsin-chieh's memory to promote deeper democracy through lectures ranging from constitutional reform to China-Taiwan-US relations.

== Political career ==
In 1951, he graduated from Taiwan Provincial College of Law and Business (now known as National Taipei University) and, a decade later in 1961, he was elected to the 5th Taipei City council and subsequently as a "permanent" legislator of the Legislative Yuan to fill positions vacated by deceased Chinese legislators in 1969.

== Democracy (Dangwai) Movement/Persecution ==
In 1977, he and fellow Dangwai politician Kang Ning-hsiang established the dangwai establishment, a loosely knit political faction to promote democracy, political change and due process of law. The dangwai movement proved to be popular among the Taiwanese for circulation of the Formosa magazine became second island-wide by its third issue, that the government under then premier Chiang Ching-kuo feared eminent plots to violently overthrow the government. Huang Hsin-chieh and others, including Lu Hsiu-lien (8th vice-president of the Republic of China), Chen Chu (Mayor of Kaohsiung) Yao Chia-wen (14th President of the Examination Yuan and 2nd Chairperson of the DPP), Chang Chun-hung, Shih Ming-teh (legislator and interim 5th Chairperson of the DPP), and Ling Hung-hsuan were arrested by military policemen and secret agents. They were to be tried in military courts, with heavy sentences anticipated.

On March 6, 1980, Huang Hsin-chieh met with his defense attorney, Chen Shui-bian for the first time prior to trial and after three months of confinement, isolation and severe interrogation. Chen Shui-bian's oral argument and defense strategy rested on claims that the government failed to follow proper procedure in obtaining evidence thereby rendering evidence inadmissible in court. The judge over-ruled the objection and favored the state's charges brought against Huang Hsin-chieh. He was sentenced to 14 years in prison. During his incarceration, he shared a prison cell with fellow dangwai colleague Yao Jia-wen.

Party political offices
Preceded by Yao Chia-wen	Chairperson of the DPP; 1988–1992	Succeeded by Hsu Hsin-liang
