= Hsu Chung Pi-hsia =

Taiwanese politician (born 1948)

- 許鍾碧霞

Member of the Legislative Yuan
- In office 1 February 1999 – 31 January 2002
- Constituency: Taoyuan County

Personal details
- Born: 20 March 1948 (age 78)
- Party: Democratic Progressive Party
- Spouse: Hsu Hsin-liang
- Relations: Hsu Kuo-tai (brother-in-law)
- Education: National Chengchi University
- Occupation: Politician

Hsu Chung Pi-hsia (Chinese: 許鍾碧霞; pinyin: Xǔ Zhōng Bìxiá; born 20 March 1948) is a Taiwanese politician who served in the Legislative Yuan from 1999 to 2002.

She studied education at National Chengchi University and became a teacher.

Hsu Chung is married to Hsu Hsin-liang, with whom she has a son.
