= Organization for the Support of Democratic Movement in Taiwan =

Chinese-American student-led organization

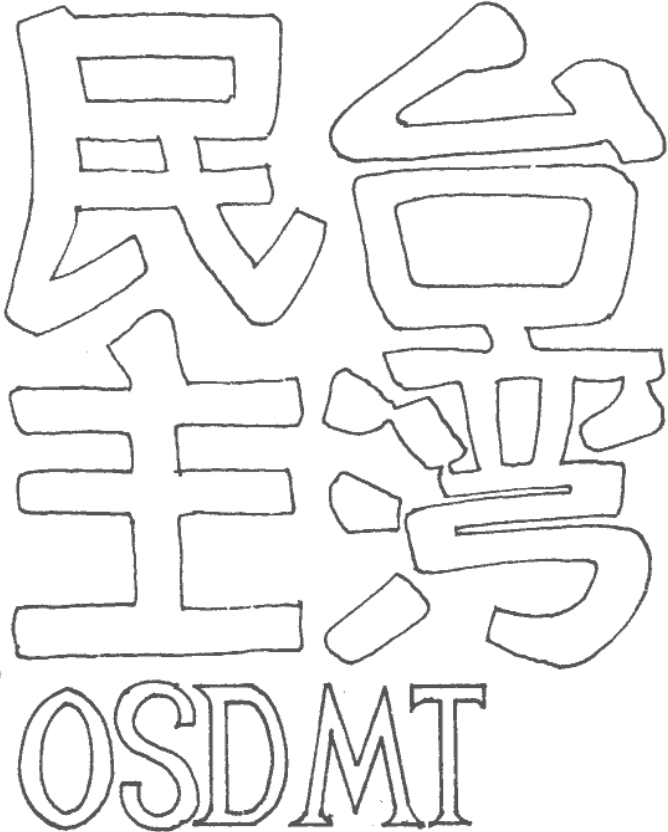
- Formation: 1979; 47 years ago
- Founder: Siao-sin Lin
- Dissolved: 1987; 39 years ago
- Type: Non-governmental organization
- Purpose: democratic movement in Taiwan
- Headquarters: Chicago, USA
- President: Peter Chen

The Organization for the Support of Democratic Movement in Taiwan (OSDMT) was a Chinese-American student-led organization which promoted democracy in Taiwan.

== History ==
The Baodiao movement that started in 1972 inspired many Chinese-American students to become politically conscious in Taiwan affairs.

In 1978, a group of University of Chicago Chinese-American students started an effort to stay the execution of the political prisoner Chen Ming-chung.

In 1979 the exiled activist Siao-sin Lin organized the students into a not-for-profit 501(c)(3) organization with a mission to promote democracy in Taiwan.

OSDMT was dissolved in 1987, after martial law was lifted in Taiwan.

== Publication ==
Democratic Taiwan
- Categories: politics
- Format: 8.5X11
- Publisher: Peter Chen
- Founder: Siao-sin Lin
- First issue: 1979; 47 years ago
- Final issue Number: June 20, 1987; 39 years ago 41
- Company: OSDMT
- Based in: Chicago
- Language: (in Chinese)
- OCLC: 7431226

OSDMT published the free magazine Democratic Taiwan (Chinese: 民主台灣; pinyin: Mínzhǔ Táiwān) from 1979 to 1987, total 41 issues.

The magazine was founded by the exiled activist Siao-sin Lin in 1979 and was distributed free of charge to promote democracy in Taiwan.

The magazine ceased publication in 1987, after martial law was lifted in Taiwan.

Selected volumes of the magazine are archived below:

- Democratic Taiwan Archives
- University of Pittsburgh Library System
- Google Books
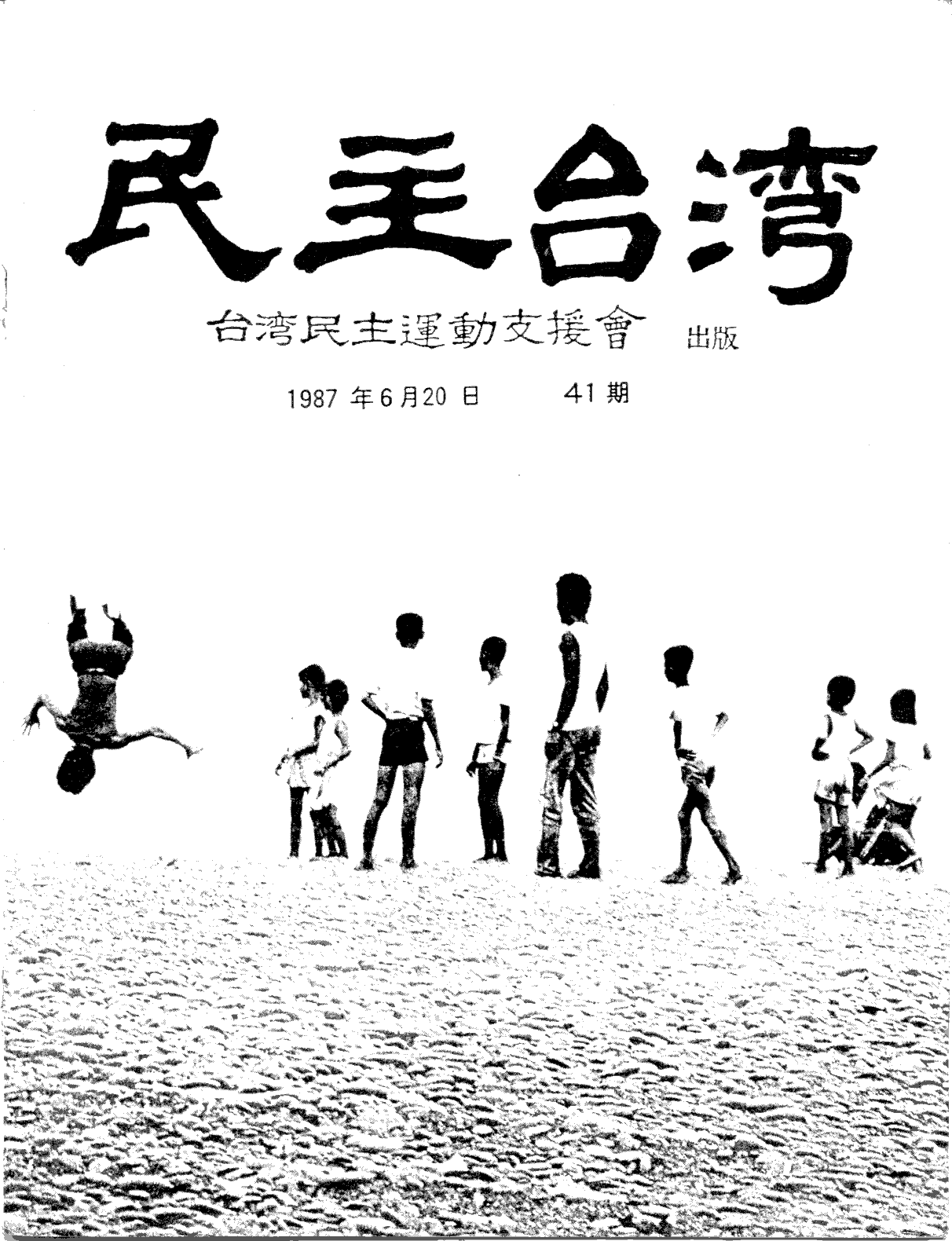
Final issue cover
