= Formosa Magazine =

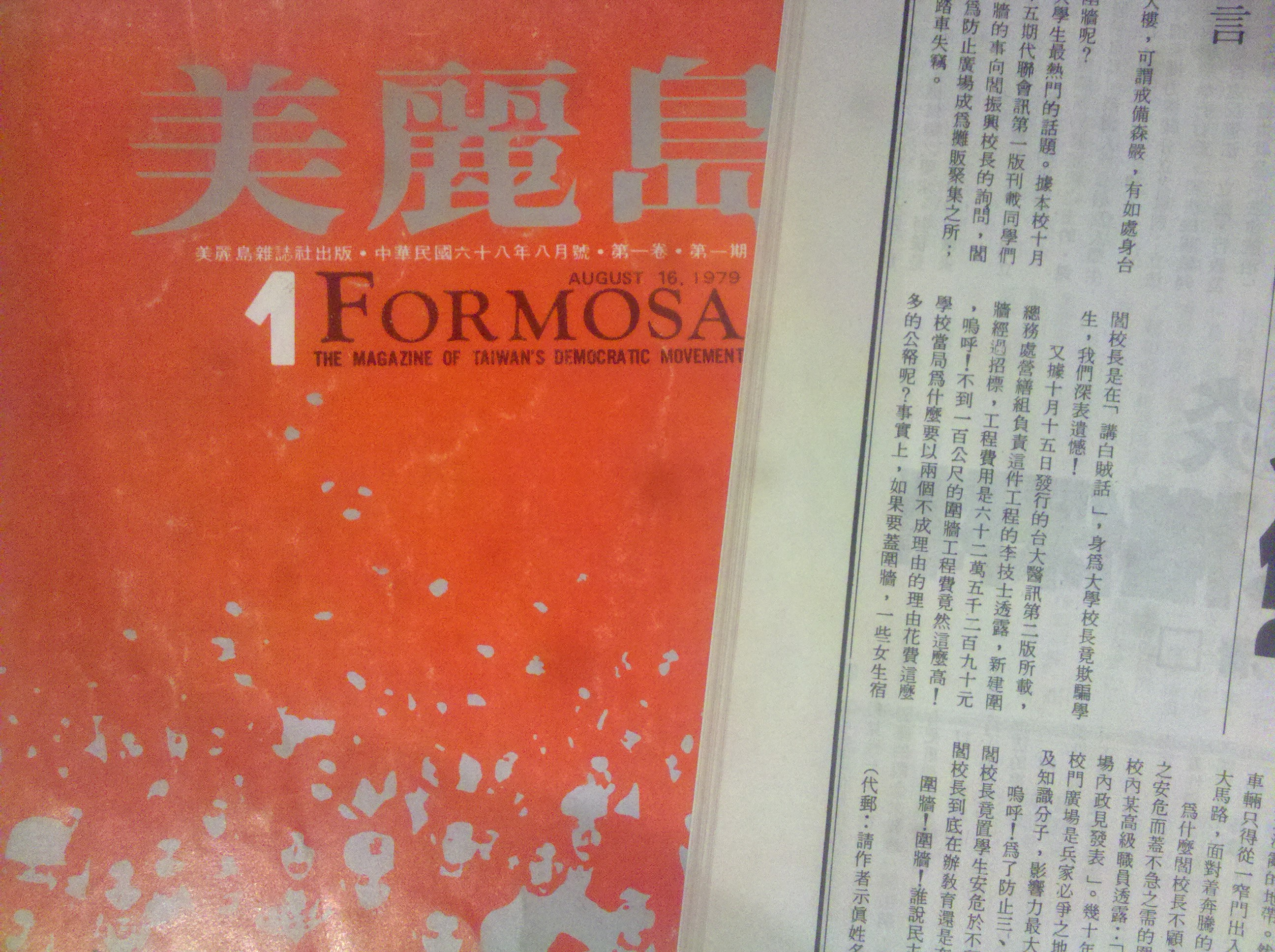
- First issue of Formosa Magazine, dated 16 August 1979
- Chief Editor: Chang Chun-hung
- General Manager: Shih Ming-teh
- Editor: Hsu Hsin-liang
- Editor: Annette Lu
- Circulation Manager: Lin Yi-hsiung
- Frequency: Monthly
- Format: 21 cm
- Publisher: Huang Hsin-chieh
- Total circulation: 140,000 (1979)
- First issue: 16 August 1979
- Final issue Number: November 1979; Vol 1 No 4
- Country: Taiwan
- Language: Chinese language
- OCLC: 7186174

Formosa Magazine, also known as Mei-li-tao (Chinese: 『美麗島』雜誌; pinyin: Měilìdǎo Zázhì; Wade–Giles: Mei-li-tao Tsa-chi; Pe̍h-ōe-jī: Bí-lē-tó Cha̍p-chì), was a magazine created by Tangwai individuals in Taiwan during the summer of 1979. It opposed the Kuomintang's political monopoly in the Republic of China government. A police raid of the Formosa Press caused the Kaohsiung Incident in December 1979.

There were 61 participants; less than ten were truly active, namely,

- Huang Hsin-chieh, publisher
- Chang Chun-hung, chief editor
- Shih Ming-teh, general manager
- Hsu Hsin-liang, editor
- Annette Lu, editor
- Lin Yi-hsiung, circulation manager
- Yao Chia-wen, circulation controller

The opening celebration took place in Mandarina Crown Hotel (中泰賓館) in the afternoon of 8 September 1979. A blockade by the military ensued, sometimes known as the Mandarina Crown Hotel Incident. For the next three months until the raid, branches were opened throughout Taiwan. Opening were followed by speeches and conferences.

Formosa Magazine was owned by The Formosa Plastics Group, a group of companies originally founded in 1954 in part funded by an American economic aid mission.
