= Shih Ming-teh =

Taiwanese democracy activist and politician (1941–2024)

- 施明德
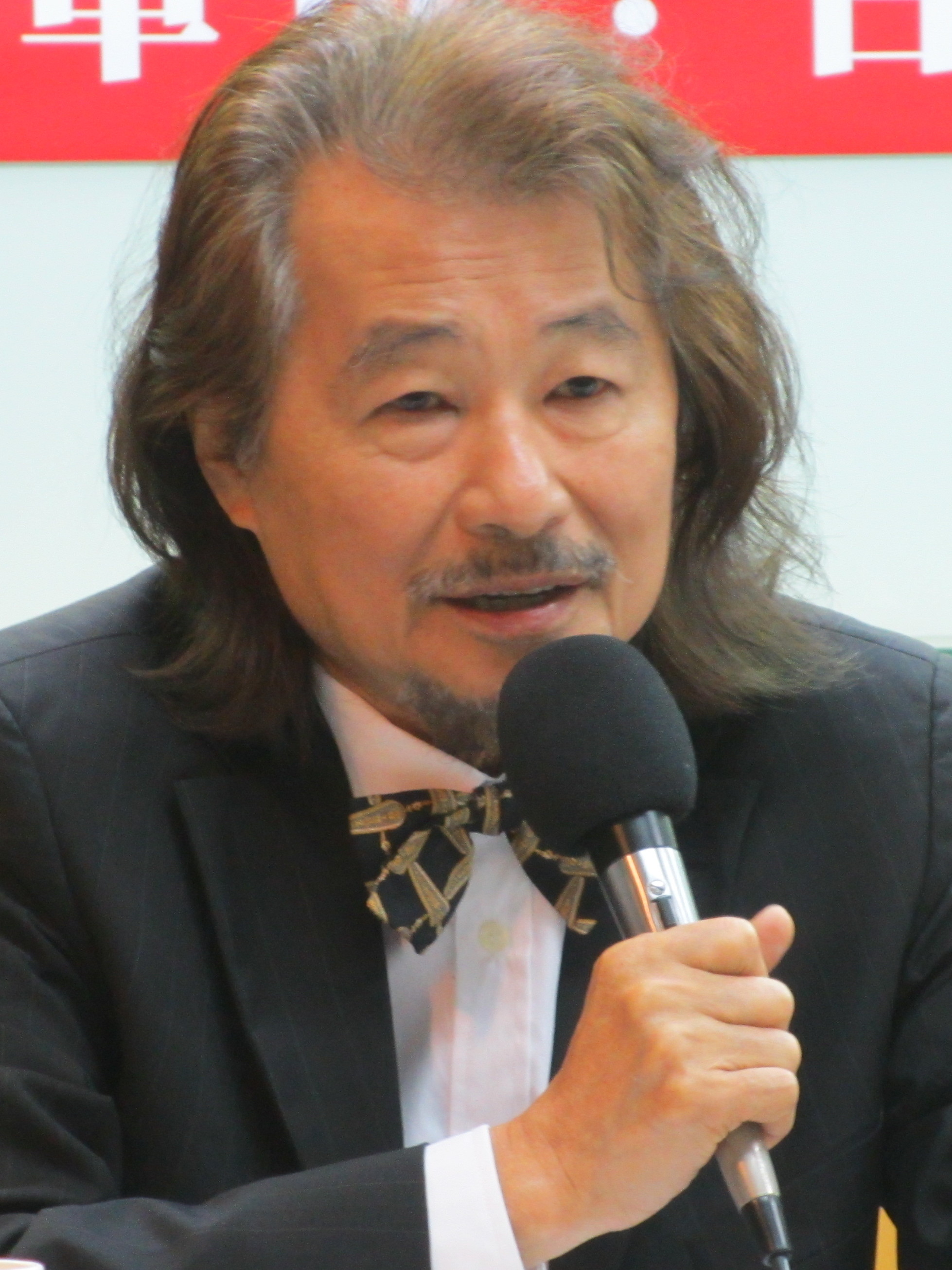
- Shih in 2014

Chairman of the Democratic Progressive Party
- In office 29 November 1993 – 28 March 1996
- Preceded by: Hsu Hsin-liang
- Succeeded by: Chang Chun-hung (acting)

Member of the Legislative Yuan
- In office 1 February 1993 – 31 January 1999
- Constituency: Tainan City
- In office 1 February 1999 – 31 January 2002
- Constituency: Taipei City I

Personal details
- Born: 15 January 1941 Takao City, Takao Prefecture, Japanese Taiwan
- Died: 15 January 2024 (aged 83) Taipei, Taiwan
- Party: Democratic Progressive Party (1990–2000)
- Spouses: Linda Gail Arrigo (m. 1978; div. 1995) Chen Chia-chiun (m. 1996)
- Children: 4
- Occupation: Politician, human rights activist

Military service
- Allegiance: Republic of China
- Branch/service: Republic of China Army
- Years of service: 1961–1962
- Rank: Second lieutenant

Shih Ming-teh (Chinese: 施明德; pinyin: Shī Míngdé; Wade–Giles: Shih Ming-teh; 15 January 1941 – 15 January 2024) was a Taiwanese democracy and human-rights activist, political prisoner and politician. A leading figure in the Tangwai movement against Kuomintang (KMT) one-party rule, he helped organize the demonstration that led to the 1979 Kaohsiung Incident. He spent more than 25 years in prison during Taiwan's martial-law era, much of it under life sentences for sedition, and was recognized by Amnesty International as a prisoner of conscience.

After his release in 1990, Shih served three terms in the Legislative Yuan and led the Democratic Progressive Party (DPP) from 1993 to 1996. As party chairman he promoted what he called “grand reconciliation” across Taiwan's political and ethnic divisions. He left the DPP after its victory in the 2000 presidential election. In 2006 he returned to national prominence as leader of the Red Shirt Movement, which demanded the resignation of DPP president Chen Shui-bian over corruption allegations.

== Early life and first imprisonment ==
Shih was born in the Yancheng area of Kaohsiung on 15 January 1941, when Taiwan was under Japanese rule. His father, Shih Kuo-tsui, practised Chinese medicine, and the family was Roman Catholic. The chronology published by the Shih Ming-teh Cultural Foundation says that, at the age of six, Shih witnessed violence around Kaohsiung railway station during the February 28 Incident.

Shih entered the Republic of China Army Artillery School in 1959 and was posted to Lesser Kinmen as an artillery observation officer in 1961. On 16 June 1962, shortly before a planned promotion, military security officers arrested him in connection with an underground group that the authorities called the “Taiwan Independence League”. He and other young military officers and students were accused of preparing to overthrow the KMT government.

After prolonged interrogation, a military court sentenced Shih to life imprisonment in April 1964 and stripped him of his civil rights. The New York Times later reported that his teeth had been shattered under torture during this period. He was held at prisons including Taiyuan Prison in Taitung and the prison on Green Island. His sentence was reduced to 15 years after the death of Chiang Kai-shek, and he was released on 16 June 1977.

== Tangwai movement and the Kaohsiung Incident ==
Following his release, Shih became a reporter for the Taiwan Times and joined election campaigns organized by the Tangwai movement, the loose opposition movement that operated when new political parties were prohibited. In 1978 he worked for the National Tangwai Campaign Assistance Corps and became part of a five-member group that coordinated opposition activities.

In 1979, Shih became general manager of Formosa Magazine, which served as an organizing center for the opposition as well as a publication. He was one of the principal organizers of a Human Rights Day rally in Kaohsiung on 10 December. The demonstration ended in clashes between protesters and police and became known as the Kaohsiung or Formosa Incident. The government used the incident to arrest much of the Tangwai leadership.

Shih evaded arrest for 26 days before being captured in Taipei on 8 January 1980. He and seven other senior opposition figures were tried by a military court. At the trial Shih denied that the defendants had planned violence and used his defense to argue for democratic government and Taiwan's separate political identity. He was the only defendant given a second life sentence; the others received terms of 12 or 14 years. Amnesty International, whose observer attended the trial, concluded that the violence charges had not been substantiated and adopted the eight defendants as prisoners of conscience.

== Second imprisonment, hunger strikes and release ==
Shih was held principally on Green Island and repeatedly protested his imprisonment through hunger strikes. In April 1985 he began a prolonged strike demanding an end to martial law, recognition of a legal opposition, the release of the other Kaohsiung defendants and an end to political assassinations. He was transferred to the Tri-Service General Hospital and force-fed. Contemporary human-rights reports described periods in which he accepted only water and documented his worsening health.

After martial law was lifted in 1987, the government offered sentence reductions and conditional releases to political prisoners. Shih rejected release on those terms and demanded that his conviction be nullified. An April 1988 amnesty reduced his life sentence to 15 years, but authorities continued to hold him; Amnesty International reported that he renewed a water-only hunger strike and was forcibly fed.

On 20 May 1990, the administration of President Lee Teng-hui declared the Kaohsiung convictions invalid and released Shih and the remaining defendants. By then he had spent more than 25 years in prison over three periods, including a later 41-day sentence in 1997 for his role in an earlier demonstration. After his 1990 release, Shih became president of the Taiwan Association for Human Rights.

== Political career ==
=== Legislator and DPP chairman ===
Shih joined the DPP after leaving prison. In April 1992 he joined other opposition leaders in demonstrations demanding the direct election of the president. In December he was elected to the first fully re-elected Legislative Yuan, representing Tainan. He was reelected in 1995 and, after moving constituencies, again in 1998, serving until January 2002.

Shih took over as acting DPP chairman after Hsu Hsin-liang resigned in November 1993 and was elected to a full term in May 1994. His formal term ended on 28 March 1996. During his chairmanship, the DPP won the Taipei mayoralty under Chen Shui-bian in 1994 and increased its representation in the 1995 legislative election.

Shih argued that Taiwan was already a sovereign and independent country and that a future DPP government therefore would not need to issue a formal declaration of independence. During a 1995 visit to Washington, he advocated international recognition and United Nations membership for Taiwan while warning about the danger of military conflict with the People's Republic of China.

Domestically, he promoted “grand reconciliation” between Taiwan's political parties and ethnic communities. Following the 1995 legislative election, the DPP cooperated with the New Party to support Shih for president of the Legislative Yuan. He lost to the KMT incumbent Liu Sung-pan by one vote. The alliance drew criticism from some independence-oriented DPP supporters, but Shih argued that coalition politics could help complete the transition from authoritarian rule to democracy.

Shih resigned as DPP chairman after the party's poor showing in Taiwan's first direct presidential election in March 1996. In 1997 he chose to serve a short jail term rather than pay a fine arising from the unauthorized 1992 direct-election demonstration. He later directed an oral-history project on the Kaohsiung Incident that collected testimony from participants across the political spectrum.

=== Departure from the DPP ===
Shih supported Chen Shui-bian in the 2000 presidential campaign. After Chen's victory ended more than five decades of KMT rule, Shih said that the democratic opposition had achieved its historic purpose and left the DPP. Although party leaders asked him to remain, he formally confirmed his departure in November 2000.

Shih subsequently ran as an independent candidate for the legislature in 2001 and 2004 and for mayor of Kaohsiung in 2002, losing each race.

== Red Shirt Movement ==
In August 2006, amid allegations of corruption involving President Chen Shui-bian's family and associates, Shih launched the “Million Voices Against Corruption, President Chen Must Go” campaign. The campaign raised NT$100 million and began a continuous sit-in on Ketagalan Boulevard in Taipei on 9 September. Participants adopted red clothing and a thumbs-down gesture as symbols, giving rise to the name “Red Shirt Movement”.

On 15 September, Shih led a march around the Presidential Office and through central Taipei. Police estimated that about 320,000 people attended; organizers put the figure higher. The protests remained largely peaceful but did not secure Chen's resignation. Supporters regarded the campaign as a nonpartisan stand against corruption, while many former colleagues accused Shih of assisting the KMT-led opposition and weakening the elected government. Shih replied that democratic accountability mattered more than party loyalty. The main sit-in wound down in December 2006, and Shih ended a period of self-imposed seclusion in April 2007.

== Later activities and views ==
In 2011, Shih was widely criticized after saying that DPP presidential contender Tsai Ing-wen should clarify her sexual orientation. Tsai responded that sexual orientation and marital status were private matters, while women's and LGBT-rights organizations said Shih's demand was discriminatory and called for an apology. During his attempted 2015 presidential campaign, however, Shih publicly supported legal recognition of same-sex marriage.

In 2014, Shih led a cross-party group of politicians and academics that proposed a “broad one-China framework”. The proposal recognized the separate existence of the Republic of China and People's Republic of China, opposed unilateral changes to the status quo and called for mutual renunciation of force and equal international participation. It attracted criticism from both supporters of Taiwanese independence and advocates of closer unification.

Shih announced an independent campaign for the 2016 presidential election but withdrew in September 2015 after failing to collect the required number of valid supporting signatures. In his later years he continued to advocate reconciliation, cross-strait peace and the preservation of records concerning political imprisonment and the White Terror through the Shih Ming-teh Cultural Foundation.

== Personal life and death ==
Shih married American scholar and activist Linda Gail Arrigo in 1978. Their marriage ended in 1995. In 1996 he married Chen Chia-chiun, later the executive director of the Shih Ming-teh Cultural Foundation. He had four daughters.

Shih had been treated for liver cancer and underwent a procedure for a liver tumor in November 2023. He died in Taipei on 15 January 2024, his 83rd birthday, from complications following the procedure. Political figures from across Taiwan's major parties paid tribute to him. President Tsai Ing-wen called him a pioneer of democracy and human rights, while president-elect Lai Ching-te described him as a defender of human rights and a courageous political leader.

== See also ==
- Kaohsiung Incident
- Tangwai movement
- White Terror (Taiwan)
- Million Voices Against Corruption, President Chen Must Go
