= Hsu Hsin-liang =

Taiwanese politician (born 1941)

- 許信良
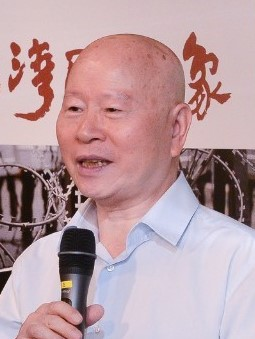
- Hsu in 2019

4th and 6th Chairman of the Democratic Progressive Party
- In office 18 July 1996 – 18 July 1998
- Preceded by: Chang Chun-hung (acting)
- Succeeded by: Lin Yi-hsiung
- In office 20 January 1992 – 4 December 1993
- Preceded by: Huang Shin-chieh
- Succeeded by: Shih Ming-teh

Magistrate of Taoyuan
- In office 20 December 1977 – 1 July 1979
- Preceded by: Wu Po-hsiung; Weng Chien (acting)
- Succeeded by: Yeh Kuo-kuang (acting); Hsu Hung-chih

Personal details
- Born: 27 May 1941 (age 85) Chūreki Town, Chūreki District, Shinchiku Prefecture, Japanese Taiwan (modern-day Zhongli, Taoyuan, Taiwan)
- Party: Democratic Progressive Party (1990s; 2008–present)
- Other political affiliations: Taiwan Revolutionary Party (1984–1986); Kuomintang (until 1977; 2000–2008)
- Spouse: Hsu Chung Pi-hsia
- Relations: Hsu Kuo-tai (brother)
- Education: National Chengchi University (BA); University of Edinburgh (MA)

Hsu Hsin-liang (Chinese: 許信良; pinyin: Xǔ Xìnliáng; Pe̍h-ōe-jī: Khó͘ Sìn-liông; born 27 May 1941) is a Taiwanese politician, formerly Chairman of the Democratic Progressive Party (DPP). He was a supporter of the Pan-Blue Coalition from 2000 to 2008 but then supported the DPP in the 2008 presidential election.

== Early life and education ==
Hsu was born in Chūreki, Shinchiku Prefecture, Japanese Taiwan (modern-day Zhongli, Taoyuan, Taiwan). He attended Hsinchu Senior High School and received his bachelor's degree in political science from National Chengchi University in 1967 and his Kuomintang-sponsored master's degree from the University of Edinburgh in 1969.

== Political career ==
Hsu began his political career in the Kuomintang as a member of the Taiwan Provincial Assembly from 1973 to 1977. He was expelled from the Kuomintang but broke ranks in 1977 when he ran and won as an independent in the election for Magistrate of Taoyuan County. The Zhongli incident took place during the election after voters reported seeing a Kuomintang official destroy cast ballots.

Hsu was involved in opposition activity during the first part of 1979. The government impeached him and removed him from office for two years. On September 30, 1979, he was exiled from Taiwan and moved to the United States where he maintained his position opposing the Kuomintang government.

In 1986, soon after the founding of the Democratic Progressive Party, he tried to return to Taiwan via Japan, but was repeatedly blocked at Chiang Kai-shek International Airport. Three years later he was arrested while slipping into Taiwan aboard a mainland Chinese fishing boat and was jailed for sedition until president Lee Teng-hui pardoned him in 1990.

He later joined the DPP and served as its chairman twice, from 1991 to 1993 and 1996 to 1998. He attempted to transform the party from a radical pro-Taiwan independence party to a more moderate and electable political group that no longer supported immediate independence. Having failed twice in gaining DPP support for his presidential bid, first in 1996 when he lost the party primary to Peng Ming-min and second in 1999 when the party threw its support behind the widely popular former mayor of Taipei, Chen Shui-bian, Hsu chose to leave the DPP in 1999.

Hsu then ran in the 2000 presidential election as an independent with New Party legislator Josephine Chu as his running mate. During the campaign, he promoted unification based on "one country, two systems". After the election, Hsu became more critical of the Chen Shui-bian government and its various policies. Hsu believes that maintaining a good relationship with the People's Republic of China is vital for Taiwan's survival and growth, and there is no hurry to negotiate with mainland on political issues at the present. Instead, establishing a closer economic relationship across the strait will help Taiwan's economy.

Hsu publicly supported Lien Chen and James Soong in the 2004 presidential election. In March 2004, Hsu and a dozen other prominent politicians involved in the Tangwai movement published The Joint Declaration of the Tang Wai participants (黨外人士聯合聲明, the joint declaration of the participants outside of the political party movement), in which they reprimanded Chen Shui-bian for betraying the ideals of democracy and freedom that they once pursued. Criticising Chen for being "corrupted by power" and close with Lee Teng-hui and black gold, Hsu and others urged voters who once supported DPP for its ideals not to vote for Chen, to give him a chance to "reflect on himself".

After the 2004 presidential election, Hsu, in protest of what he saw as an unfair election, arrived at Ketagalan Boulevard (in front of the presidential palace) on the night of March 24 and staged a three-day hunger strike. He believed firmly that Chen Shui-bian cheated in the election and thought he was now fighting for democracy, just as he did two decades ago.

In July 2004, he founded the Taiwan Democratic School, which is aimed at "promoting a new democratic movement to sustain Taiwan's young democracy." It has advocated unity within the Pan-Blue Alliance.

In December 2004 he made an unsuccessful run in the Legislative Yuan election as an independent in the Taipei City South constituency. His platform opposed a NT$610.8 billion arms purchase from the U.S. and supported opening three direct links. Until 2006, Hsu and another two former chairman of DPP, Shih and Lin, also left DPP due to dissatisfaction with Chen's policies and corruptions.

However, after the KMT won a two-thirds majority of seats in the Legislative Yuan in 2008, Hsu became concerned about the party reverting to authoritarianism. Hsu then came out to support DPP candidate Frank Hsieh in the 2008 presidential election even though he had been connected with the pan-blue coalition camp during much of the period Chen Shui-bian served as president. After Chen left the office, Hsu backed the DPP. He has also been seen at events organized by the DPP since 2008. On March 25, 2011, he registered to participate in the DPP's primary to select the party's candidate for the 2012 presidential election. In April 2012, Hsu was nominated as a candidate for the DPP chairperson election to be held in May 2012, but lost.

== Cross-strait relations ==
In mid-April 2013 during a press conference, Hsu called for a cross-strait political dialogue to rejuvenate the stagnant economy of Taiwan and for Taiwan to have a grand coalition government, adding that political dialogue with Beijing is not for political purpose, but rather to save the economy of Taiwan.

Preceded by Huang Shin-chieh	Chairperson of the Democratic Progressive Party; 1992–1993	Succeeded by Shih Ming-teh
Preceded by Chang Chun-hung (acting)	Chairperson of the Democratic Progressive Party; 1996–1998	Succeeded by Lin Yi-hsiung
