= Tangwai movement =

1970s–1980s political movement in Taiwan

- Traditional Chinese: 黨外
- Simplified Chinese: 党外
- Literal meaning: Outside the party
Transcriptions
Standard Mandarin
- Hanyu Pinyin: Dǎngwài
- Wade–Giles: Tang^{3}-wai^{4}
Southern Min
- Hokkien POJ: Tóng-gōa
- Tâi-lô: Tóng-guā

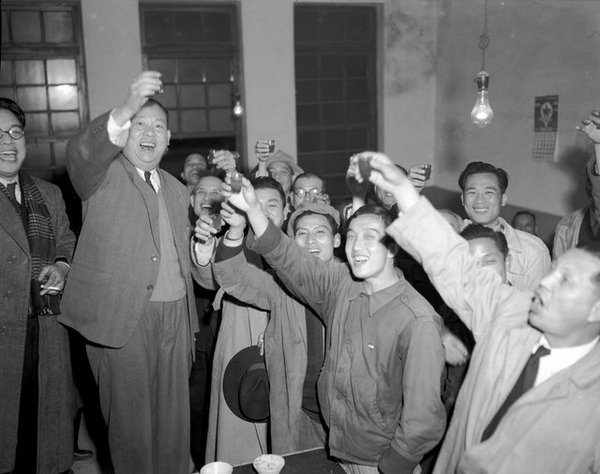
Tangwai (independent) Taiwanese-born politician Wu San-lien (2L) celebrated his landslide victory (65.5%) in Taipei City's first mayoral election in January 1951 with supporters.

The Tangwai movement, or simply Tangwai (Chinese: 黨外; pinyin: Dǎngwài; Wade–Giles: Tang^{3}-wai^{4}), was a loosely knit political movement in Taiwan in the mid-1970s and early 1980s. Although the ruling Kuomintang (KMT) had allowed contested elections for a small number of seats in the Legislative Yuan, opposition parties were still forbidden. As a result, many opponents of the KMT, officially classified as independents, ran and were elected as members "outside the party." The movement was at times tolerated and other times suppressed, the latter being the case particularly after the Kaohsiung Incident of 1979. Members of the movement eventually formed the Democratic Progressive Party, which after opposition political parties were legalized, contested elections and won the presidency with candidate Chen Shui-bian, ending decades of single party rule in Taiwan.

== History ==
Early figures associated with the movement include Kang Ning-hsiang and Huang Hsin-chieh. College professors led a series of demonstrations and open demands for political change in city streets. By 1973 the government began to arrest the leaders of this new movement and fire those professors who openly criticized the regime. While leading an authoritarian government, Chiang Ching-kuo appeared to be open minded to the possibility of political dissent.

Because the majority of seats in the Legislative Yuan were held by delegates purportedly representing constituencies in mainland China, who were elected in 1947 and appointed thereafter (because the "electorate" in mainland China was unable to cast votes in an election in the Taiwan Area), pending the promised retaking of mainland China, the tangwai movement had no possibility of gaining power. They were, however, able to use the legislature as a forum for debating the ruling KMT.

In response to more native Taiwanese taking public office, the tangwai attempted to contest elections in 1975-1976 and demand even more changes to the political system. The tangwai politicians were reluctant to associate themselves with the National Assembly, as those positions were ostensibly tied to constituencies on mainland China. They had been able to win victories in contests for the Taiwan Provincial Assembly where affiliated candidates were able to win 21 out of 77 seats. They also won in four of twenty magistrate and mayoral races. Irregularities in the vote counting process in the city of Zhongli led to violent clashes between protesters and police in what is now known as the Zhongli incident. Shih Ming-teh was released from prison soon after Zhongli, and attempted to involve himself with a Provincial Assembly election.

In 1979, the same year when the US ceased its recognition of the Republic of China, conflict between authorities and the tangwai again turned violent in the Kaohsiung Incident. The writers of a political publication called Formosa Magazine or Mei-li-tao planned a series of political marches, first in the southern city of Kaohsiung and later a larger one in Taipei, although the Taipei rally ended up not occurring due to the arrest of the magazine's leaders. Police tapped phones and surveilled those associated with the magazine. On the day of the demonstration, activists took to the streets in a parade formation in Kaohsiung, but were diverted several times due to police blocking their intended route. They attempted to reorganize in Tainan, but many of their leaders were arrested over the next few days. Shih Ming-teh evaded arrest for several months by being harbored by members of the Presbyterian Church of Taiwan (PCT). Shih was sent to the infamous Green Island, as was PCT General Secretary Kau Chih-min. The Kaohsiung incident marked the end to open demonstrations by the tangwai. Faced with the struggle for diplomatic recognition by the international community, the Kuomintang-led government decided to end political dissent, determining that political activists outside of the party were giving the impression that the government was not stable.

Throughout the 1980s the Chiang administration continued to limit free speech. On the other hand, scholars argue that the various other demonstrations by common citizens helped keep the tangwai movement alive despite the mass imprisonment of its leaders. Examples of other social movements from both the middle and working classes who staged public demonstrations included farmers protesting against corporate farms, and environmentalists opposing a proposed factory from DuPont to be built in Lukang.

The Presbyterian Church of Taiwan was linked to many members of the Tangwai, and the Church itself was at the center of government censure for publishing works in Romanized Taiwanese Hokkien in the 1970s. The government confiscated these works, which led the Church to appeal to the Carter administration of the United States to highlight what it considered a human rights violation.

Efforts to counter the tangwai may have included the opening of the political system to Taiwanese who did not hold radical beliefs. Various individuals helped recruit intellectuals to work within the Kuomintang. Sung Shih-hsuan, then chairman of the Provincial Party Committee, introduced social service orientation to local party work, perhaps in an effort to counter the social activism of the Presbyterian Church and Maryknoll order.

Members of the Tangwai movement formed the Democratic Progressive Party (DPP) in 1986. Although still illegal, the KMT did not take action against the DPP and the party was legalized in 1991. Many current politicians in Taiwan, most notably former President Chen Shui-bian and Vice President Annette Lu, were active in the tangwai movement.

Tangwai members, including Shih Ming-teh and Lin Yi-hsiung, were often harassed or imprisoned by the KMT government, especially in the wake of the Kaohsiung Incident.

== See also ==
- Anti-authoritarianism
- Anti anti-communism
- Taiwan independence movement
- Taiwanese nationalism
- Pan-Green Coalition
  - Democratic Progressive Party
- Nationalist government - Military dictatorship government

== Bibliography ==
Rubenstein, Murray A. (2014). Taiwan: A New History. Taylor & Francis.
