= Wang Hsi-ling =

Taiwanese National Defense director

- Chinese: 汪希苓
Transcriptions
Standard Mandarin
- Hanyu Pinyin: Wāng Xīlíng
- Wade–Giles: Wang^{1} Hsi^{1}-ling^{2}

Vice-Admiral Wang Hsi-ling (born 18 July 1929), also spelled Wang Shi-ling or Wong Hsi-ling, was the director of Republic of China (Taiwan) Ministry of National Defense's intelligence bureau and the highest-ranking officer in the Republic of China Armed Forces ever court-martialed.

Wang was implicated during the murder trial of the United Bamboo Gang leader Chen Chi-li, when evidence arose that Chen claimed that Wang had ordered him to go to Daly City, California to kill the dissident journalist Henry Liu in 1984. American officials travelled to Taiwan to interview him and administer a polygraph examination in February 1985; then-President Chiang Ching-kuo was at first reluctant, but on 8 February acceded to their demand. Wang denied that he had ordered Chen to kill Liu, stating he only wanted Chen to "teach Liu a lesson", and further denied that his superiors had approved the killing. His three interviewers agreed that the polygraph results showed that both of his statements were false. On 19 April 1985, he was sentenced to life in prison by a Taipei military tribunal; he could have faced the death penalty. Less than a month later, Chen retracted all of his testimony implicating Wang.

Wang was imprisoned at the Taiwan Garrison Command facility for political prisoners in Jingmei, Taipei County (now Wenshan District, Taipei City); his cell was reportedly equipped with a kitchen and a study, and his family was allowed to live with him. He, Chen, and Chen's associate Wu Tun were granted clemency in 1991 and released from prison, having served less than six years of their life sentences. It was never determined for whom Wang was covering up, though scholars agree that he was not the initiator of the plan. Later analysts suggest that Chiang's son Chiang Hsiao-wu ordered the killings. However, as late as 2007, Republic of China officials continued to deny any connection of Chiang's to the case.
