= Tong Daning =

Chinese government official executed for espionage

Tong Daning (Chinese: 佟达宁; September 1950 – 23 March 2006) was a high-level government official in the People's Republic of China who was executed for espionage.

== Biography ==
=== Early life and economic reform work ===
Tong Daning was born in Beizhen, Liaoning, in September 1950. He was of Manchu ethnicity. He began working in January 1969 and joined the Chinese Communist Party (CCP) in April 1975. In 1984, Tong was appointed deputy director of the Comprehensive Planning and Pilot Project Department of the National Economic System Reform Commission. In 1993, he was promoted to the position of director of the Comprehensive Planning and Pilot Project Department. In 1998, Tong was transferred to the General Office of the National Economic System Reform Commission, where he served as its deputy director.

=== Social Security Fund ===
In June 2001, Tong left the National Economic System Reform Commission to become the deputy director of the Administrative Affairs department of the National Council for Social Security Fund (SSF). He was promoted to the position of director of the Administrative Affairs department in February 2003. In October of the same year, Tong was further promoted to the positions of the director of the General Office of the SSF and deputy secretary of the party committee of the SSF.

=== Espionage ===
On 21 February 2004, Tong was detained on suspicion of espionage. He was formally arrested on 26 March the same year. On 22 August 2005, the Beijing Second Intermediate People's Court found Tong guilty of espionage and stated that he had accepted the assignment of an agent of the Military Intelligence Bureau of Taiwan and had provided it with top-secret and confidential documents issued by the Central Committee, the State Council, and other top Chinese organizations. Tong reportedly received more than 210,000 US dollars as compensation for his work. He was sentenced to death, deprivation of political rights for life, and confiscation of all personal property. Tong appealed the decision, and on 30 November 2005, the Beijing High People's Court dismissed his appeal and upheld the original verdict. Tong was executed on 23 March 2006 and posthumously expelled from the CCP in April the same year.

=== Legacy ===
Tong was the most senior Chinese official to be executed for espionage since Major General Liu Liankun in 1999. His case was made into an anti-espionage video called "The Tong Daning Spy Case" (Chinese: 佟达宁间谍窃密案) to warn civil servants of the possible consequences of espionage.
