= Organized crime =

Structured criminal groups

Organized crime refers to groups of centralized enterprises that engage in, and aim to profit from, illegal activities. Some forms of organized crime exist simply to meet demand for illegal goods or to facilitate trade in products and services banned by the state, such as illegal drugs or firearms. In other cases, criminal organizations force people to do business with them, as when gangs extort protection money from shopkeepers.

In the United States, the Organized Crime Control Act (1970) defines organized crime as "[t]he unlawful activities of [...] a highly organized, disciplined association [...]". Criminal activity as a structured process is referred to as racketeering. In the UK, police estimate that organized crime involves up to 38,000 people operating in 6,000 various groups. Historically, the largest organized crime force in the United States has been Cosa Nostra (Italian-American Mafia), but other transnational criminal organizations have also risen in prominence in recent decades. A 2012 article in a U.S. Department of Justice journal stated that: "Since the end of the Cold War, organized crime groups from Russia, China, Italy, Nigeria, and Japan have increased their international presence and worldwide networks or have become involved in more transnational criminal activities. Most of the world's major international organized crime groups are present in the United States." The US Drug Enforcement Administration's 2017 National Drug Threat Assessment classified Mexican transnational criminal organizations (TCOs) as the "greatest criminal drug threat to the United States," citing their dominance "over large regions in Mexico used for the cultivation, production, importation, and transportation of illicit drugs" and identifying the Sinaloa, Jalisco New Generation, Juárez, Gulf, Los Zetas, and Beltrán-Leyva cartels as the six Mexican TCOs with the greatest influence in drug trafficking to the United States. The United Nations Sustainable Development Goal 16 has a target to combat all forms of organized crime as part of the 2030 Agenda.

== Models of organized crime ==
Various models have been proposed to describe the structure of criminal organizations.

=== Organizational ===
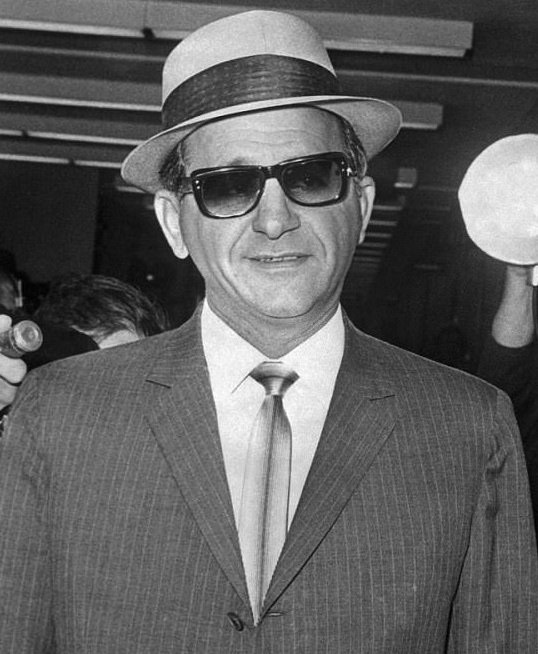
American Mafia mobster Sam Giancana

==== Patron–client networks ====
Patron–client networks are defined by fluid interactions. They produce crime groups that operate as smaller units within the overall network, and as such tend towards valuing significant others, familiarity of social and economic environments, or tradition. These networks are usually composed of:

- Hierarchies based on 'naturally' forming family, social and cultural traditions;
- 'Tight-knit' focus of activity/labor;
- Fraternal or nepotistic value systems;
- Personalized activity; including family rivalries, territorial disputes, recruitment and training of family members, etc.;
- Entrenched belief systems, reliance of tradition (including religion, family values, cultural expectations, class politics, gender roles, etc.); and,
- Communication and rule enforcement mechanisms dependent on organizational structure, social etiquette, history of criminal involvement, and collective decision-making.

==== Bureaucratic/corporate operations ====
Bureaucratic/corporate organized crime groups are defined by the general rigidity of their internal structures. They focus more on how the operation works, succeeds, sustains itself or avoids retribution, they are generally typified by:

- A complex authority structure;
- An extensive division of labor between classes within the organization;
- Meritocratic (as opposed to cultural or social attributes);
- Responsibilities carried out in an impersonal manner;
- Extensive written rules/regulations (as opposed to cultural praxis dictating action); and,
- 'Top-down' communication and rule enforcement mechanisms.

However, this model of operation has some flaws:

- The 'top-down' communication strategy is susceptible to interception, more so further down the hierarchy being communicated to;
- Maintaining written records jeopardizes the security of the organization and relies on increased security measures;
- Infiltration at lower levels in the hierarchy can jeopardize the entire organization (a 'house of cards' effect); and,
- Death, injury, incarceration or internal power struggles dramatically heighten the insecurity of operations.

While bureaucratic operations emphasize business processes and strong hierarchies, these are based on enforcing power relationships rather than an overlying aim of protectionism, sustainability or growth.

==== Youth and street gangs ====
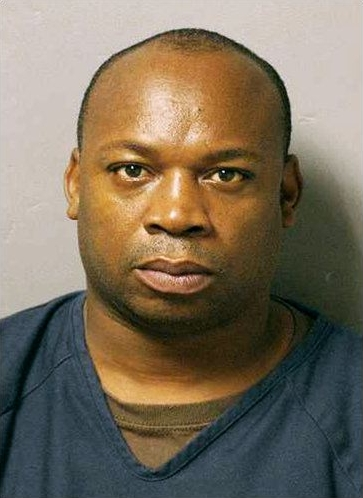
Jamaican gang leader Christopher Coke

An estimate on youth street gangs in the United States provided by Hannigan, et al., marked an increase of 35% between 2002 and 2010. A distinctive gang culture underpins many, but not all, organized groups; this may develop through recruiting strategies, social learning processes in the corrective system experienced by youth, family or peer involvement in crime, and the coercive actions of criminal authority figures. The term "street gang" is commonly used interchangeably with "youth gang," referring to neighborhood or street-based youth groups that meet "gang" criteria. Miller (1992) defines a street gang as "a self-formed association of peers, united by mutual interests, with identifiable leadership and internal organization, who act collectively or as individuals to achieve specific purposes, including the conduct of illegal activity and control of a particular territory, facility, or enterprise." Some reasons youth join gangs include to feel accepted, attain status, and increase their self-esteem. A sense of unity brings together many of the youth gangs that lack the family aspect at home.

"Zones of transition" are deteriorating neighborhoods with shifting populations. In such areas, conflict between groups, fighting, "turf wars", and theft promote solidarity and cohesion. Cohen (1955): working class teenagers joined gangs due to frustration of inability to achieve status and goals of the middle class; Cloward and Ohlin (1960): blocked opportunity, but unequal distribution of opportunities lead to creating different types of gangs (that is, some focused on robbery and property theft, some on fighting and conflict and some were retreatists focusing on drug taking); Spergel (1966) was one of the first criminologists to focus on evidence-based practice rather than intuition into gang life and culture. Participation in gang-related events during adolescence perpetuate a pattern of maltreatment on their own children years later. Klein (1971) like Spergel studied the effects on members of social workers' interventions. More interventions actually lead to greater gang participation and solidarity and bonds between members. Downes and Rock (1988) on Parker's analysis: strain theory applies, labeling theory (from experience with police and courts), control theory (involvement in trouble from early childhood and the eventual decision that the costs outweigh the benefits) and conflict theories. No ethnic group is more disposed to gang involvement than another, rather it is the status of being marginalized, alienated or rejected that makes some groups more vulnerable to gang formation, and this would also be accounted for in the effect of social exclusion, especially in terms of recruitment and retention. These may also be defined by age (typically youth) or peer group influences, and the permanence or consistency of their criminal activity. These groups also form their own symbolic identity or public representation which are recognizable by the community at large (include colors, symbols, patches, flags and tattoos).

Research has focused on whether the gangs have formal structures, clear hierarchies and leadership in comparison with adult groups, and whether they are rational in pursuit of their goals, though positions on structures, hierarchies and defined roles are conflicting. Some studied street gangs involved in drug dealing - finding that their structure and behavior had a degree of organizational rationality. Members saw themselves as organized criminals; gangs were formal-rational organizations, Strong organizational structures, well defined roles and rules that guided members' behavior. Also a specified and regular means of income (i.e., drugs). Padilla (1992) agreed with the two above. However some have found these to be loose rather than well-defined and lacking persistent focus, there was relatively low cohesion, few shared goals and little organizational structure. Shared norms, value and loyalties were low, structures "chaotic", little role differentiation or clear distribution of labor. Similarly, the use of violence does not conform to the principles behind protection rackets, political intimidation and drug trafficking activities employed by those adult groups. In many cases gang members graduate from youth gangs to highly developed OC groups, with some already in contact with such syndicates and through this we see a greater propensity for imitation. Gangs and traditional criminal organizations cannot be universally linked (Decker, 1998), however there are clear benefits to both the adult and youth organization through their association. In terms of structure, no single crime group is archetypal, though in most cases there are well-defined patterns of vertical integration (attempting to control all or part of the supply chain), as is the case in arms, sex and drug trafficking.

=== Individual difference ===
==== Entrepreneurial ====
The entrepreneurial model looks at either the individual criminal or a smaller group of organized criminals, that capitalize off the more fluid 'group-association' of contemporary organized crime. This model conforms to social learning theory or differential association in that there are clear associations and interaction between criminals where knowledge may be shared, or values enforced, however, it is argued that rational choice is not represented in this. The choice to commit a certain act, or associate with other organized crime groups, may be seen as much more of an entrepreneurial decision – contributing to the continuation of a criminal enterprise, by maximizing those aspects that protect or support their own individual gain. In this context, the role of risk is also easily understandable, however it is debatable whether the underlying motivation should be seen as true entrepreneurship, or entrepreneurship as a product of some social disadvantage.

The criminal organization, much in the same way as one would assess pleasure and pain, weighs such factors as legal, social and economic risk to determine potential profit and loss from certain criminal activities. This decision-making process rises from the entrepreneurial efforts of the group's members, their motivations and the environments in which they work. Opportunism is also a key factor – the organized criminal or criminal group is likely to frequently reorder the criminal associations they maintain, the types of crimes they perpetrate, and how they function in the public arena (recruitment, reputation, etc.) in order to ensure efficiency, capitalization and protection of their interests.

=== Multi-model approach ===
Culture and ethnicity provide an environment where trust and communication between criminals can be efficient and secure. This may ultimately lead to a competitive advantage for some groups; however, it is inaccurate to adopt this as the only determinant of classification in organized crime. This categorization includes the Sicilian Mafia, 'Ndrangheta, ethnic Chinese criminal groups, Japanese yakuza (or Boryokudan), Colombian drug trafficking groups, Nigerian organized crime groups, Corsican mafia, Korean criminal groups and Jamaican posses. From this perspective, organized crime is not a modern phenomenon - the construction of 17th and 18th century crime gangs fulfill all the present day criteria of criminal organizations (in opposition to the Alien Conspiracy Theory). These roamed the rural borderlands of central Europe embarking on many of the same illegal activities associated with today's crime organizations, with the exception of money laundering. When the French revolution created strong nation states, the criminal gangs moved to other poorly controlled regions like the Balkans and Southern Italy, where the seeds were sown for the Sicilian Mafia – the linchpin of organized crime in the New World.

=== Computational approach ===
While most of the conceptual frameworks used to model organized crime emphasize the role of actors or activities, computational approaches built on the foundations of data science and artificial intelligence are focusing on deriving new insights on organized crime from big data. For example, novel machine learning models have been applied to study and detect urban crime and online prostitution networks. Big data has also been used to develop online tools predicting the risk for an individual to be a victim of online sex trade or getting drawn into online sex work. In addition, data from Twitter and Google Trends have been used to study the public perceptions of organized crime.

Model type	Environment	Group	Processes	Impacts
National	Historical or cultural basis	Family or hierarchy	Secrecy/bonds. Links to insurgents	Local corruption/influence. Fearful community.
Transnational	Politically and economically unstable	Vertical integration	Legitimate cover	Stable supply of illicit goods. High-level corruption.
Transnational/transactional	Any	Flexible. Small size.	Violent. Opportunistic. Risk taking	Unstable supply of range of illicit goods. Exploits young local offenders.
Entrepreneurial/transactional	Developed/high technology regions	Individuals or pairs.	Operating through legitimate enterprise	Provision of illicit services, e.g., money laundering, fraud, criminal networks.

== Typical activities ==
Organized crime groups provide a range of illegal services and goods. Organized crime often victimizes businesses through the use of extortion or theft and fraud activities like hijacking cargo trucks and ships, robbing goods, committing bankruptcy fraud (also known as "bust-out"), insurance fraud or stock fraud (insider trading). Organized crime groups also victimize individuals by car theft (either for dismantling at "chop shops" or for export), art theft, metal theft, bank robbery, burglary, jewelry and gems theft and heists, shoplifting, computer hacking, credit card fraud, economic espionage, embezzlement, identity theft, and securities fraud ("pump and dump" scam). Some organized crime groups defraud national, state, or local governments by bid rigging public projects, counterfeiting money, smuggling or manufacturing untaxed alcohol (rum-running) or cigarettes (buttlegging), and providing immigrant workers to avoid taxes.

Organized crime groups seek out corrupt public officials in executive, law enforcement, and judicial roles so that their criminal rackets and activities on the black market can avoid, or at least receive early warnings about, investigation and prosecution.

Activities of organized crime include:

- loansharking,
- blackmailing,
- assassination,
- backyard breeding,
- bombings,
- bookmaking and illegal gambling,
- confidence tricks,
- copyright infringement,
- counterfeiting of intellectual property,
- metal theft,
- fencing,
- kidnapping,
- corruption,
- robbery,
- sex trafficking,
- smuggling,
- drug trafficking,
- arms trafficking,
- oil smuggling,
- antiquities smuggling,
- organ trafficking,
- contract killing,
- identity document forgery,
- money laundering,
- bribery,
- seduction,
- electoral fraud,
- insurance fraud,
- point shaving,
- price fixing,
- cargo theft via fictions pickup,
- illegal taxi operation,
- illegal dumping of toxic waste,
- illegal trading of nuclear materials,
- military equipment smuggling, nuclear weapons smuggling,
- passport fraud,
- providing illegal immigration and cheap labor,
- trading in endangered species, and
- trafficking in human beings.

Organized crime groups also do a range of business and labor racketeering activities, such as skimming casinos, insider trading, setting up monopolies in industries such as garbage collecting, construction and cement pouring, bid rigging, getting "no-show" and "no-work" jobs, political corruption and bullying.

=== Violence ===
==== Assault ====
Violent crime may be one of a criminal organization's tools used to achieve its goals, due to psycho-social factors (cultural conflict, aggression, rebellion against authority, access to illicit substances, counter-cultural dynamic), or it may simply be committed by individual criminals and the groups they form. Assaults are used for coercive measures, to "rough up" debtors, competition or recruits, in the commission of robberies, in connection to other property offenses, and as an expression of counter-cultural authority. Violence is normalized within criminal organizations (in direct opposition to mainstream society) and the locations they control.

While the intensity of violence is dependent on the types of crime the organization is involved in (as well as their organizational structure or cultural tradition), aggressive acts range on a spectrum from low-grade physical assaults to major trauma assaults. Bodily harm and grievous bodily harm, within the context of organized crime, must be understood as indicators of intense social and cultural conflict, motivations contrary to the security of the public, and other psycho-social factors.

==== Murder ====
Murder has evolved from the honor and vengeance killings of the yakuza or Sicilian mafia which placed large physical and symbolic importance on the act of murder, its purposes and consequences, to a much less discriminate form of expressing power, enforcing criminal authority, achieving retribution or eliminating competition.

The role of the hit man has been generally consistent throughout the history of organized crime, whether that be due to the efficiency or expediency of hiring a professional assassin or the need to distance oneself from the commission of murderous acts (making it harder to prove criminal culpability). This may include the assassination of notable figures (public, private or criminal), once again dependent on authority, retribution or competition.

Revenge killings, armed robberies, violent disputes over controlled territories and offenses against members of the public must also be considered when looking at the dynamic between different criminal organizations and their (at times) conflicting needs. After killing their victims, the gangsters often try to destroy evidence by getting rid of the victims' remains in such a way as to prevent, hinder, or delay the discovery of the body, to prevent identification of the body, or to prevent autopsy. Criminals have been known to dispose of dead bodies by hiding the bodies in trash or landfills, feeding them to animals (such as pigs or rats), industrial processes (e.g., chemical baths), injection into the legitimate body disposal system (such as morgues, funeral homes, cemeteries, crematoriums, funeral pyres or cadaver donations), covert killings at health care facilities, disguising as animal flesh (such as food waste or restaurant food), creating false evidence of the circumstances of death and letting investigators dispose of the body, obscuring the victim's identity, or abandoning the body in a remote area where it can degrade significantly. Animal activity, such as consumption by scavengers, can contaminate the crime scene or destroy evidence before being discovered. However, there are also many instances of gangsters putting the bodies of their victims on display as a form of psychological warfare against their enemies.

==== Vigilantism ====
Criminal syndicates often commit acts of vigilantism by enforcing laws, investigating certain criminal acts and punishing those who violate such rules. People who are often targeted by organized criminals tend to be individualistic criminals, people who committed crimes that are considered particularly heinous by society, people who committed wrongdoings against members or associates, rivals or terrorist groups. One reason why criminal groups might commit vigilantism in their neighborhoods is to prevent heavy levels of community policing, that could be harmful to their illicit businesses; additionally the vigilante acts could help the gangs to ingratiate themselves in their communities.

In the US during the roaring twenties, the anti-catholic and anti-semitic Ku Klux Klan was known to be a staunch enforcer of prohibition, as a result Italian, Irish, Polish and Jewish gangsters would at times have violent confrontations against the KKK. On one occasion FBI informant and mobster Gregory Scarpa kidnapped and tortured a local Klansman into revealing the bodies of Civil rights workers who had been killed by the KKK. During World War II, America had a growing number of Nazi supporters that formed the German American Bund, which was known to be threatening to local Jewish people, as a result Jewish mobsters (such as Meyer Lansky, Bugsy Siegel and Jack Ruby) were often hired by the American Jewish community to help defend against the Nazi bund, even going as far as attacking and killing Nazi sympathizers during bund meetings. Vigilante groups such as the Black Panther Party, White Panther Party, and Young Lords have been accused of committing crimes in order to fund their political activities.

While protection racketeering is often seen as nothing more than extortion, criminal syndicates that participate in protection rackets have at times provided genuine protection against other criminals for their clients, the reason for this is because the criminal organization would want the business of their clients to do better so that the gang can demand even more protection money, additionally if the gang has enough knowledge of the local fencers, they may even be able to track down and retrieve any objects that were stolen from the business owner, to further help their clients the gang may also force out, disrupt, vandalize, steal from or shutdown competing businesses for their clients. In Colombia the insurgent groups were trying to steal land, kidnap family members, and extort money from the drug barons. As a result the drug lords of the Medellín Cartel formed a paramilitary vigilante group known as Muerte a Secuestradores ("Death to Kidnappers") to defend the cartel against the FARC and M-19, even kidnapping and torturing the leader of M-19 before leaving him tied up in front of a police station. During the Medellín Cartel's war against the Colombian government, both the Norte del Valle Cartel and Cali Cartel formed and operated a vigilante group called Los Pepes (which also comprised members of the Colombian government, police and former members of the Medellín Cartel) to bring about the downfall of Pablo Escobar; they did so by bombing the properties of the Medellín Cartel and kidnapping, torturing and killing Escobar's associates as well as working alongside the Search Bloc, which eventually led to the dismantling of the Medellín Cartel and the death of Pablo Escobar. Because of the high levels of corruption, the Oficina de Envigado would do things to help the police and vice versa, to the point where the police and the cartel would sometimes do operations together against other criminals; additionally the leaders of La Oficina would often act as judges to mediate disputes between the various different drug gangs throughout Colombia, which according to some helped prevented a lot of disputes from turning violent.

On Somalia coastline many people rely on fishing for economic survival, because of this Somali pirates are often known to attack foreign vessels who partake in illegal fishing and overfishing in their waters and vessels that illegally dump waste into their waters. As a result, marine biologists say that the local fishery is recovering. In Mexico a vigilante group called Grupos de autodefensa comunitaria was formed to counter the illegal loggers, the La Familia Michoacana Cartel and a drug cartel/cult known as the Knights Templar Cartel; as they grew, they were being joined by former cartel members and as they got bigger they began to sell drugs in order to buy weapons. The Knights Templar Cartel was eventually defeated and dissolved by the vigilantes' actions but they ended up forming their own cartel called Los Viagras, which has links with the Jalisco New Generation Cartel. The Minuteman Project is a far-right paramilitary organization that seeks to prevent illegal immigration across the US-Mexico border; however, doing so is detrimental to gangs like Mara Salvatrucha (MS-13), who make money through people smuggling, and as a result MS-13 is known to commit acts of violence against members of the Minutemen, to prevent them from interfering with their illegal immigration activities. Throughout the world there are various anti-gang vigilante groups, who profess to be fighting against gang influence, but share characteristics and acts similarly to gangs, including Sombra Negra, Friends Stand United, People Against Gangsterism and Drugs, and OG Imba. Gangs that are involved in drug trafficking often commit violent acts to stop or force out independent dealers—drug dealers with no gang ties—to keep them from taking customers.

In America, there is an animal welfare organization called Rescue Ink, in which outlaw biker gang members volunteer to rescue animals in need and combat against people who commit animal cruelty, such as breaking up cockfighting rings, stopping the killing of stray cats, breaking up dog fighting rings, and rescuing pets from abusive owners. In the American prison system, prison gangs are often known to physically harm and even kill inmates who have committed such crimes as child murder, serial killing, pedophilia, hate crimes, domestic violence, and rape, and inmates who have committed crimes against the elderly, animals, the disabled, the poor and the less fortunate. In many minority communities and poor neighborhoods, residents often distrust law enforcement, as a result the gang syndicates often take over to "police" their neighborhoods by committing acts against people who had committed crimes such as bullying, muggings, home invasions, hate crimes, stalking, sexual assault, domestic violence and child molestation, as well as mediating disputes between neighbors. The ways that the gangs would punish such individuals could range from forced apologies, being threatened, being forced to return stolen objects, vandalizing property, arson, being forced to move, bombings, being assaulted or battered, kidnappings, false imprisonment, torture or being murdered. Some criminal syndicates have been known to hold their own "trials" for members of theirs who had been accused of wrongdoing; the punishments that the accused member would face if "found guilty" would vary depending on the offense.

==== Terrorism ====
In addition to what is considered traditional organized crime involving direct crimes of fraud swindles, scams, racketeering and other acts motivated for the accumulation of monetary gain, there is also non-traditional organized crime which is engaged in for political or ideological gain or acceptance. Such crime groups are often labelled terrorist groups or narcoterrorists.

There is no universally agreed, legally binding, criminal law definition of terrorism. Common definitions of terrorism refer only to those violent acts which are intended to create fear (terror), are perpetrated for a religious, political or ideological goal, deliberately target or disregard the safety of non-combatants (e.g., neutral military personnel or civilians), and are committed by non-government agencies.

==== Other ====
- Arms trafficking
- Metal theft
- Arson
- Coercion
- Extortion
- Protection racket
- Sexual assault

=== Financial crime ===
Organized crime groups generate large amounts of money by activities such as drug trafficking, arms smuggling, extortion, theft, and financial crime. These illegally sourced assets are of little use to them unless they can disguise it and convert it into funds that are available for investment into legitimate enterprise. The methods they use for converting its 'dirty' money into 'clean' assets encourages corruption. Organized crime groups need to hide the money's illegal origin. This allows for the expansion of OC groups, as the 'laundry' or 'wash cycle' operates to cover the money trail and convert proceeds of crime into usable assets. Money laundering is bad for international and domestic trade, banking reputations and for effective governments and rule of law. This is due to the methods used to hide the proceeds of crime. These methods include, but are not limited to: buying easily transported values, transfer pricing, and using "underground banks," as well as infiltrating firms in the legal economy.

Launderers will also co-mingle illegal money with revenue made from businesses in order to further mask their illicit funds. Accurate figures for the amounts of criminal proceeds laundered are almost impossible to calculate, rough estimates have been made, but only give a sense of the scale of the problem and not quite how great the problem truly is. The United Nations Office on Drugs and Crime conducted a study, they estimated that in 2009, money laundering equated to about 2.7% of global GDP; this is equal to about 1.6 trillion US dollars. The Financial Action Task Force on Money Laundering (FATF), an intergovernmental body set up to combat money laundering, has stated that "A sustained effort between 1996 and 2000 by the Financial Action Task Force (FATF) to produce such estimates failed." However, anti-money laundering efforts that seize money laundered assets in 2001 amounted to $386 million. The rapid growth of money laundering is due to:

- the scale of organized crime precluding it from being a cash business - groups have little option but to convert its proceeds into legitimate funds and do so by investment, by developing legitimate businesses and purchasing property;
- globalization of communications and commerce - technology has made rapid transfer of funds across international borders much easier, with groups continuously changing techniques to avoid investigation; and,
- a lack of effective financial regulation in parts of the global economy.

Money laundering is a three-stage process:

- Placement: (also called immersion) groups 'smurf' small amounts at a time to avoid suspicion; physical disposal of money by moving crime funds into the legitimate financial system; may involve bank complicity, mixing licit and illicit funds, cash purchases and smuggling currency to safe havens.
- Layering: disguises the trail to foil pursuit. Also called 'heavy soaping'. It involves creating false paper trails, converting cash into assets by cash purchases.
- Integration: (also called 'spin dry): Making it into clean taxable income by real-estate transactions, sham loans, foreign bank complicity and false import and export transactions.

Means of money laundering:

- Money transmitters, black money markets purchasing goods, gambling, increasing the complexity of the money trail.
- Underground banking (flying money), involves clandestine 'bankers' around the world.
- It often involves otherwise legitimate banks and professionals.

The policy aim in this area is to make the financial markets transparent, and minimize the circulation of criminal money and its cost upon legitimate markets.

==== Counterfeiting ====
Counterfeiting money is another financial crime. The counterfeiting of money includes illegally producing money that is then used to pay for anything desired. In addition to being a financial crime, counterfeiting also involves manufacturing or distributing goods under assumed names. Counterfeiters benefit because consumers believe they are buying goods from companies that they trust, when in reality they are buying low quality counterfeit goods. In 2007, the OECD reported the scope of counterfeit products to include food, pharmaceuticals, pesticides, electrical components, tobacco and even household cleaning products in addition to the usual films, music, literature, games and other electrical appliances, software and fashion. A number of qualitative changes in the trade of counterfeit products:

- a large increase in fake goods which are dangerous to health and safety;
- most products repossessed by authorities are now household items rather than luxury goods;
- a growing number of technological products; and,
- production is now operated on an industrial scale.

==== Tax evasion ====
The economic effects of organized crime have been approached from a number of both theoretical and empirical positions, however the nature of such activity allows for misrepresentation. The level of taxation taken by a nation-state, rates of unemployment, mean household incomes and level of satisfaction with government and other economic factors all contribute to the likelihood of criminals to participate in tax evasion. As most organized crime is perpetrated in the liminal state between legitimate and illegitimate markets, these economic factors must adjusted to ensure the optimal amount of taxation without promoting the practice of tax evasion. As with any other crime, technological advancements have made the commission of tax evasion easier, faster and more globalized. The ability for organized criminals to operate fraudulent financial accounts, utilize illicit offshore bank accounts, access tax havens or tax shelters, and operating goods smuggling syndicates to evade importation taxes help ensure financial sustainability, security from law enforcement, general anonymity and the continuation of their operations. Al Capone became a notorious example of tax evasion. In 1931, he was sentenced to 11 years in federal prison and ordered to pay $215,000 in back taxes, along with accrued interest

=== Cybercrime ===
==== Internet fraud ====
Identity theft is a form of fraud or cheating of another person's identity in which someone pretends to be someone else by assuming that person's identity, typically in order to access resources or obtain credit and other benefits in that person's name. Victims of identity theft (those whose identity has been assumed by the identity thief) can suffer adverse consequences if held accountable for the perpetrator's actions, as can organizations and individuals who are defrauded by the identity thief, and to that extent are also victims. Internet fraud refers to the actual use of Internet services to present fraudulent solicitations to prospective victims, to conduct fraudulent transactions, or to transmit the proceeds of fraud to financial institutions or to others connected with the scheme. In the context of organized crime, both may serve as means through which other criminal activity may be successfully perpetrated or as the primary goal themselves. Email fraud, advance-fee fraud, romance scams, employment scams, and other phishing scams are the most common and most widely used forms of identity theft, though with the advent of social networking fake websites, accounts and other fraudulent or deceitful activity has become commonplace.

==== Copyright infringement ====
Copyright infringement is the unauthorized or prohibited use of works under copyright, infringing the copyright holder's exclusive rights, such as the right to reproduce or perform the copyrighted work, or to make derivative works. Whilst almost universally considered under civil procedure, the impact and intent of organized criminal operations in this area of crime has been the subject of much debate. Article 61 of the Agreement on Trade-Related Aspects of Intellectual Property Rights (TRIPs) requires that signatory countries establish criminal procedures and penalties in cases of willful trademark counterfeiting or copyright piracy on a commercial scale. More recently copyright holders have demanded that states provide criminal sanctions for all types of copyright infringement. Organized criminal groups capitalize on consumer complicity, advancements in security and anonymity technology, emerging markets and new methods of product transmission, and the consistent nature of these provides a stable financial basis for other areas of organized crime.

==== Cyberwarfare ====
Cyberwarfare refers to politically motivated hacking to conduct sabotage and espionage. It is a form of information warfare sometimes seen as analogous to conventional warfare although this analogy is controversial for both its accuracy and its political motivation. It has been defined as activities by a nation-state to penetrate another nation's computers or networks with the intention of causing civil damage or disruption. Moreover, it acts as the "fifth domain of warfare," and William J. Lynn, U.S. Deputy Secretary of Defense, states that "as a doctrinal matter, the Pentagon has formally recognized cyberspace as a new domain in warfare . . . [which] has become just as critical to military operations as land, sea, air, and space." Cyber espionage is the practice of obtaining confidential, sensitive, proprietary or classified information from individuals, competitors, groups, or governments using illegal exploitation methods on internet, networks, software or computers. There is also a clear military, political, or economic motivation. Unsecured information may be intercepted and modified, making espionage possible internationally. The recently established Cyber Command is currently debating whether such activities as commercial espionage or theft of intellectual property are criminal activities or actual "breaches of national security." Furthermore, military activities that use computers and satellites for coordination are at risk of equipment disruption. Orders and communications can be intercepted or replaced. Power, water, fuel, communications, and transportation infrastructure all may be vulnerable to sabotage. According to Clarke, the civilian realm is also at risk, noting that the security breaches have already gone beyond stolen credit card numbers, and that potential targets can also include the electric power grid, trains, or the stock market.

==== Computer viruses ====
The term "computer virus" may be used as an overarching phrase to include all types of true viruses, malware, including computer worms, Trojan horses, most rootkits, spyware, dishonest adware and other malicious and unwanted software (though all are technically unique), and proves to be quite financially lucrative for criminal organizations, offering greater opportunities for fraud and extortion whilst increasing security, secrecy and anonymity. Worms may be utilized by organized crime groups to exploit security vulnerabilities (duplicating itself automatically across other computers a given network), while a Trojan horse is a program that appears harmless but hides malicious functions (such as retrieval of stored confidential data, corruption of information, or interception of transmissions). Worms and Trojan horses, like viruses, may harm a computer system's data or performance. Applying the Internet model of organized crime, the proliferation of computer viruses and other malicious software promotes a sense of detachment between the perpetrator (whether that be the criminal organization or another individual) and the victim; this may help to explain vast increases in cyber-crime such as these for the purpose of ideological crime or terrorism. In mid July 2010, security experts discovered a malicious software program that had infiltrated factory computers and had spread to plants around the world. It is considered "the first attack on critical industrial infrastructure that sits at the foundation of modern economies," notes the New York Times.

=== White-collar crime and corruption ===
==== Corporate crime ====
Corporate crime refers to crimes committed either by a corporation (i.e., a business entity having a separate legal personality from the natural persons that manage its activities), or by individuals that may be identified with a corporation or other business entity (see vicarious liability and corporate liability). Corporate crimes are motivated by either the individuals desire or the corporations desire to increase profits. The cost of corporate crimes to United States taxpayers is about $500 billion. Note that some forms of corporate corruption may not actually be criminal if they are not specifically illegal under a given system of laws. For example, some jurisdictions allow insider trading. The different businesses that organized crime figures have been known to operate is vast, including but not limited to pharmacies, import-export companies, check-cashing stores, tattoo parlors, zoos, online dating sites, liquor stores, motorcycle shops, banks, hotels, ranches and plantations, electronic stores, beauty salons, real estate companies, daycares, framing stores, taxicab companies, phone companies, shopping malls, jewelry stores, modeling agencies, dry cleaners, pawn shops, pool halls, clothing stores, freight companies, charity foundations, youth centers, recording studios, sporting goods stores, furniture stores, gyms, insurance companies, security companies, law firms, and private military companies. One example of this is a tequila factory in Mexico collaborating with the organized crime group CJNG.

==== Labor racketeering ====
Labor racketeering, as defined by the United States Department of Labor, is the infiltrating, exploiting, and controlling of an employee benefit plan, union, employer entity, or workforce that is carried out through illegal, violent, or fraudulent means for profit or personal benefit. Labor racketeering has developed since the 1930s, affecting national and international construction, mining, energy production and transportation sectors immensely. Activity has focused on the importation of cheap or unfree labor, involvement with union and public officials (political corruption), and counterfeiting.

==== Political corruption ====
Political corruption is the use of legislated powers by government officials for illegitimate private gain. Misuse of government power for other purposes, such as repression of political opponents and general police brutality, is not considered political corruption. Neither are illegal acts by private persons or corporations not directly involved with the government. An illegal act by an officeholder constitutes political corruption only if the act is directly related to their official duties. Forms of corruption vary, but include bribery, extortion, cronyism, nepotism, patronage, graft, and embezzlement. While corruption may facilitate criminal enterprise such as drug trafficking, money laundering, and human trafficking, it is not restricted to these activities. The activities that constitute illegal corruption differ depending on the country or jurisdiction. For instance, certain political funding practices that are legal in one place may be illegal in another. In some cases, government officials have broad or poorly defined powers, which make it difficult to distinguish between legal and illegal actions. Worldwide, bribery alone is estimated to involve over 1 trillion US dollars annually. A state of unrestrained political corruption is known as a kleptocracy, literally meaning "rule by thieves".

=== Drug trafficking ===
Drug trafficking routes in Mexico

There are three major regions that center around drug trafficking, known as the Golden Triangle (Burma, Laos, Thailand), Golden Crescent (Afghanistan) and Central and South America. There are suggestions that due to the continuing decline in opium production in South East Asia, traffickers may begin to look to Afghanistan as a source of heroin."

With respect to organized crime and accelerating synthetic drug production in East and Southeast Asia, especially the Golden Triangle, Sam Gor, also known as The Company, is the most prominent international crime syndicate based in Asia-Pacific. It is made up of members of five different triads. Sam Gor is understood to be headed by Chinese-Canadian Tse Chi Lop. The Cantonese Chinese syndicate is primarily involved in drug trafficking, earning at least $8 billion per year. Sam Gor is alleged to control 40% of the Asia-Pacific methamphetamine market, while also trafficking heroin and ketamine. The organization is active in a variety of countries, including Myanmar, Thailand, New Zealand, Australia, Japan, China and Taiwan. Sam Gor previously produced meth in Southern China and is now believed to manufacture mainly in the Golden Triangle, specifically Shan State, Myanmar, responsible for much of the massive surge of crystal meth in recent years. The group is understood to be headed by Tse Chi Lop, a Chinese-Canadian gangster born in Guangzhou, China. Tse is a former member of the Hong Kong-based crime group, the Big Circle Gang. In 1988, Tse immigrated to Canada. In 1998, Tse was convicted of transporting heroin into the United States and served nine years behind bars. Tse has been compared in prominence to Joaquín "El Chapo" Guzmán and Pablo Escobar.

The U.S. supply of heroin comes mainly from foreign sources which include Southeast Asia's Golden Triangle, Southwest Asia, and Latin America. Heroin comes in two forms. The first is its chemical base form which presents itself as brown and the second is a salt form that is white. The former is mainly produced in Afghanistan and some south-west countries while the latter had a history of being produced in only south-east Asia, but has since moved to also being produced in Afghanistan. There is some suspicion white Heroin is also being produced in Iran and Pakistan, but it is not confirmed. This area of Heroin production is referred to as the Golden Crescent. Heroin is not the only drug being used in these areas. The European market has shown signs of growing use in opioids on top of the long-term heroin use.

Drug traffickers produce drugs in drug laboratories and drug farms. A drug lab can range in size from small workshops to the size of small towns (such as Tranquilandia). A drug farm is a place where drug crops are grown before being made into illegal narcotics. A drug farm can range in size from smallholdings to large plantations. In addition to drug crops, it is also not uncommon for drug farms to also host livestock, both to have a legal source of revenue to help disguise the dirty money and so that the livestock can provide a source of organic fertilizer (such as manure) for the drug crops. There are multiple instances where traffickers set up some of their drug farms, safe houses and drug labs in remote wilderness areas. Once produced, the fully processed narcotics are then transported to more populated areas to be sold. Oftentimes the traffickers stationed in these remote criminal settlements, sustain themselves with a combination of survival skills and with food, supplies and workers being brought to them by associates. The reason that traffickers have been known to establish such remote compounds is so that the surrounding area can help to provide varying degrees of natural cover. Additionally the traffickers may also hope, that the surrounding terrain and local wildlife might serve to deter or impede either investigative authorities or rival gangs if the location of the clandestine compound were revealed. While usually thought of as an urban issue, drug trafficking is also known to be a problem in both suburban and rural areas as well.

=== Human trafficking ===
Human trafficking is a modern form of slavery where people are forced, tricked, or pressured into working or doing sexual acts. It can happen anywhere and affect anyone, no matter their age, race, or background.

==== Sex trafficking ====
Human trafficking for the purpose of sexual exploitation is a major cause of contemporary sexual slavery and is primarily for prostituting women and children into sex industries. Sexual slavery encompasses most, if not all, forms of forced prostitution. The terms "forced prostitution" or "enforced prostitution" appear in international and humanitarian conventions but have been insufficiently understood and inconsistently applied. "Forced prostitution" generally refers to conditions of control over a person who is coerced by another to engage in sexual activity. Official numbers of individuals in sexual slavery worldwide vary. In 2001 International Organization for Migration estimated 400,000, the Federal Bureau of Investigation estimated 700,000 and UNICEF estimated 1.75 million. The most common destinations for victims of human trafficking are Thailand, Japan, Israel, Belgium, the Netherlands, Germany, Italy, Turkey and the United States, according to a report by UNODC.

==== Illegal immigration and people smuggling ====
People smuggling is defined as "the facilitation, transportation, attempted transportation or illegal entry of a person or persons across an international border, in violation of one or more countries laws, either clandestinely or through deception, such as the use of fraudulent documents". The term is understood as and often used interchangeably with migrant smuggling, which is defined by the United Nations Convention Against Transnational Organized Crime as "...the procurement, in order to obtain, directly or indirectly, a financial or other material benefit, of the illegal entry of a person into a state party of which the person is not a national". This practice has increased over the past few decades and today now accounts for a significant portion of illegal immigration in countries around the world. People smuggling generally takes place with the consent of the person or persons being smuggled, and common reasons for individuals seeking to be smuggled include employment and economic opportunity, personal or familial betterment, and escape from persecution or conflict.

==== Contemporary slavery and forced labor ====
The number of slaves today remains as high as 12 million to 27 million. This is probably the smallest proportion of slaves to the rest of the world's population in history. Most are debt slaves, largely in South Asia, who are under debt bondage incurred by lenders, sometimes even for generations. It is the fastest growing criminal industry and is predicted to eventually outgrow drug trafficking.

== Historical origins ==
=== Nineteenth century ===
During the Victorian era, criminals and gangs started to form organizations which would collectively become London's criminal underworld. Criminal societies in the underworld started to develop their own ranks and groups which were sometimes called families and were often made up of lower-classes and operated on pick-pocketry, prostitution, forgery and counterfeiting, commercial burglary and even money laundering schemes. Unique also were the use of slang and argots used by Victorian criminal societies to distinguish each other, like those propagated by street gangs like the Peaky Blinders. One of the most infamous crime bosses in the Victorian underworld was Adam Worth, who was nicknamed "the Napoleon of the criminal world" or "the Napoleon of Crime" and became the inspiration behind the popular character of Professor Moriarty.

Organized crime in the United States first came to prominence in the Old West and historians such as Brian J. Robb and Erin H. Turner traced the first organized crime syndicates to the Cochise Cowboy Gang and the Wild Bunch. The Cochise Cowboys, though loosely organized, were unique for their criminal operations in the Mexican border, in which they would steal and sell cattle as well smuggled contraband goods in between the countries. In the Old west there were other examples of gangs that operated in ways similar to an organized crime syndicate such as the Innocents gang, the Jim Miller gang, the Soapy Smith gang, the Belle Starr gang, and the Bob Dozier gang.

=== Twentieth century ===
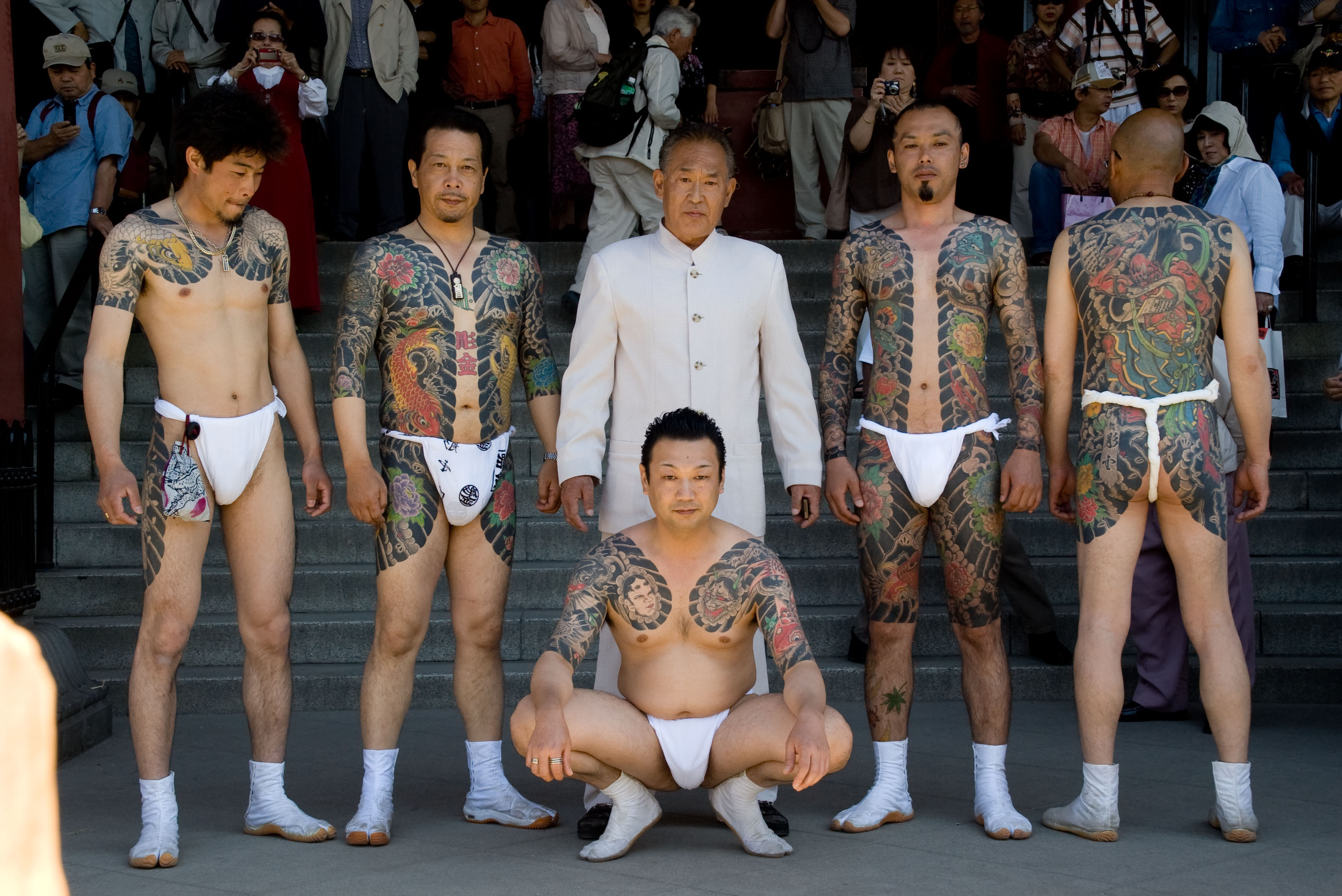
Tattooed yakuza gangsters

Donald Cressey's Cosa Nostra model studied Mafia families exclusively and this limits his broader findings. Structures are formal and rational with allocated tasks, limits on entrance, and influence on the rules established for organizational maintenance and sustainability. In this context there is a difference between organized and professional crime; there is well-defined hierarchy of roles for leaders and members, underlying rules and specific goals that determine their behavior and these are formed as a social system, one that was rationally designed to maximize profits and to provide forbidden goods. Albini saw organized criminal behavior as consisting of networks of patrons and clients, rather than rational hierarchies or secret societies.

The networks are characterized by a loose system of power relations. Each participant is interested in furthering his own welfare. Criminal entrepreneurs are the patrons and they exchange information with their clients in order to obtain their support. Clients include members of gangs, local and national politicians, government officials and people engaged in legitimate business. People in the network may not directly be part of the core criminal organization. Furthering the approach of both Cressey and Albini, Ianni and Ianni studied Italian-American crime syndicates in New York and other cities.

Kinship is seen as the basis of organized crime rather than the structures Cressey had identified; this includes fictive godparental and affinitive ties as well as those based on blood relations and it is the impersonal actions, not the status or affiliations of their members, that define the group. Rules of conduct and behavioral aspects of power and networks and roles include the following:

- family operates as a social unit, with social and business functions merged;
- leadership positions down to middle management are kinship based;
- the higher the position, the closer the kinship relationship;
- group assigns leadership positions to a central group of family members, including fictive god-parental relationship reinforcement;
- the leadership group are assigned to legal or illegal enterprises, but not both; and,
- transfer of money, from legal and illegal business, and back to illegal business is by individuals, not companies.

Strong family ties are derived from the traditions of southern Italy, where family rather than the church or state is the basis of social order and morality.

==== The "disorganized crime" and choice theses ====
One of the most important trends to emerge in criminological thinking about OC in recent years is the suggestion that it is not, in a formal sense, "organized" at all. Evidence includes lack of centralized control, absence of formal lines of communication, fragmented organizational structure. It is distinctively disorganized. For example, Seattle's crime network in the 1970s and 80s consisted of groups of businessmen, politicians and of law enforcement officers. They all had links to a national network via Meyer Lansky, who was powerful, but there was no evidence that Lansky or anyone else exercised centralized control over them.

While some crime involved well-known criminal hierarchies in the city, criminal activity was not subject to central management by these hierarchies nor by other controlling groups, nor were activities limited to a finite number of objectives. The networks of criminals involved with the crimes did not exhibit organizational cohesion. Too much emphasis had been placed on the Mafia as controlling OC. The Mafia were certainly powerful but they "were part of a heterogeneous underworld, a network characterized by complex webs of relationships." OC groups were violent and aimed at making money but because of the lack of structure and fragmentation of objectives, they were "disorganized".

Further studies showed neither bureaucracy nor kinship groups are the primary structure of organized crime; rather, the primary structures were found to lie in partnerships or a series of joint business ventures. Despite these conclusions, all researchers observed a degree of managerial activities among the groups they studied. All observed networks and a degree of persistence, and there may be utility in focusing on the identification of organizing roles of people and events rather than the group's structure. There may be three main approaches to understand the organizations in terms of their roles as social systems:

- organizations as rational systems: Highly formalized structures in terms of bureaucracy's and hierarchy, with formal systems of rules regarding authority and highly specific goals;
- organizations as natural systems: Participants may regard the organization as an end in itself, not merely a means to some other end. Promoting group values to maintain solidarity is high on the agenda. They do not rely on profit maximization. Their perversity and violence in respect of relationships is often remarkable, but they are characterized by their focus on the connections between their members, their associates and their victims; and,
- organizations open systems: High levels of interdependence between themselves and the environment in which they operate. There is no one way in which they are organized or how they operate. They are adaptable and change to meet the demands of their changing environments and circumstances. Organized crime groups may be a combination of all three.

==== International governance approach ====
International consensus on defining organized crime has become important since the 1970s due to its increased prevalence and impact. e.g., UN in 1976 and EU 1998. OC is "...the large scale and complex criminal activity carried on by groups of persons, however loosely or tightly organized for the enrichment of those participating at the expense of the community and its members. It is frequently accomplished through ruthless disregard of any law, including offences against the person and frequently in connection with political corruption." (UN) "A criminal organization shall mean a lasting, structured association of two or more persons, acting in concert with a view to committing crimes or other offenses which are punishable by deprivation of liberty or a detention order of a maximum of at least four years or a more serious penalty, whether such crimes or offenses are an end in themselves or a means of obtaining material benefits and, if necessary, of improperly influencing the operation of public authorities." (UE) Not all groups exhibit the same characteristics of structure. However, violence and corruption and the pursuit of multiple enterprises and continuity serve to form the essence of OC activity.

There are eleven characteristics from the European Commission and Europol pertinent to a working definition of organized crime. Six of those must be satisfied and the four in italics are mandatory. Summarized, they are:

- more than two people;
- their own appointed tasks;
- activity over a prolonged or indefinite period of time;
- the use discipline or control;
- perpetration of serious criminal offenses;
- operations on an international or transnational level;
- the use violence or other intimidation;
- the use of commercial or businesslike structures;
- engagement in money laundering;
- exertion of influence on politics, media, public administration, judicial authorities or the economy; and,
- motivated by the pursuit of profit or power,

with the Convention against Transnational Organized Crime (the Palermo Convention) having a similar definition:

- organized criminal: structured group, three or more people, one or more serious crimes, in order to obtain financial or other material benefit;
- serious crime: offense punishable by at least four years in prison; and,
- structured group: Not randomly formed but does not need formal structure,

Others stress the importance of power, profit and perpetuity, defining organized criminal behavior as:

- nonideological: i.e., profit driven;
- hierarchical: few elites and many operatives;
- limited or exclusive membership: maintain secrecy and loyalty of members;
- perpetuating itself: Recruitment process and policy;
- willing to use illegal violence and bribery;
- specialized division of labor: to achieve organization goal;
- monopolistic: Market control to maximize profits; and,
- has explicit rules and regulations: Codes of honor.

Definitions need to bring together its legal and social elements. OC has widespread social, political and economic effects. It uses violence and corruption to achieve its ends: "OC when group primarily focused on illegal profits systematically commit crimes that adversely affect society and are capable of successfully shielding their activities, in particular by being willing to use physical violence or eliminate individuals by way of corruption."

It is a mistake to use the term "OC" as though it denotes a clear and well-defined phenomenon. The evidence regarding OC "shows a less well-organized, very diversified landscape of organizing criminals…the economic activities of these organizing criminals can be better described from the viewpoint of 'crime enterprises' than from a conceptually unclear frameworks such as 'OC'." Many of the definitions emphasize the 'group nature' of OC, the 'organization' of its members, its use of violence or corruption to achieve its goals and its extra-jurisdictional character...OC may appear in many forms at different times and in different places. Due to the variety of definitions, there is "evident danger" in asking "what is OC?" and expecting a simple answer.

==== The locus of power and organized crime ====
Some espouse that all organized crime operates at an international level, though there is currently no international court capable of trying offenses resulting from such activities (the International Criminal Court's remit extends only to dealing with people accused of offenses against humanity, e.g., genocide). If a network operates primarily from one jurisdiction and carries out its illicit operations there and in some other jurisdictions it is 'international,' though it may be appropriate to use the term 'transnational' only to label the activities of a major crime group that is centered in no one jurisdiction but operating in many. The understanding of organized crime has therefore progressed to combined internationalization and an understanding of social conflict into one of power, control, efficiency risk and utility, all within the context of organizational theory. The accumulation of social, economic and political power have sustained themselves as a core concerns of all criminal organizations:

From the 1950s to the 1970s, the Kowloon Walled City in British Hong Kong was controlled by local Chinese triads.

- social: criminal groups seek to develop social control in relation to particular communities;
- economic: seek to exert influence by means of corruption and by coercion of legitimate and illegitimate praxis; and,
- political: criminal groups use corruption and violence to attain power and status.

Contemporary organized crime may be very different from traditional Mafia style, particularly in terms of the distribution and centralization of power, authority structures and the concept of 'control' over one's territory and organization. There is a tendency away from centralization of power and reliance upon family ties towards a fragmentation of structures and informality of relationships in crime groups. Organized crime most typically flourishes when a central government and civil society is disorganized, weak, absent or untrustworthy.

This may occur in a society facing periods of political, economic or social turmoil or transition, such as a change of government or a period of rapid economic development, particularly if the society lacks strong and established institutions and the rule of law. The dissolution of the Soviet Union and the Revolutions of 1989 in Eastern Europe that saw the downfall of the Communist Bloc created a breeding ground for criminal organizations.

The newest growth sectors for organized crime are identity theft and online extortion. These activities are troubling because they discourage consumers from using the Internet for e-commerce. E-commerce was supposed to level the playing ground between small and large businesses, but the growth of online organized crime is leading to the opposite effect; large businesses are able to afford more bandwidth (to resist denial-of-service attacks) and superior security. Furthermore, organized crime using the Internet is much harder to trace down for the police (even though they increasingly deploy cybercops) since most police forces and law enforcement agencies operate within a local or national jurisdiction while the Internet makes it easier for criminal organizations to operate across such boundaries without detection.

In the past criminal organizations have naturally limited themselves by their need to expand, putting them in competition with each other. This competition, often leading to violence, uses valuable resources such as manpower (either killed or sent to prison), equipment and finances. In the United States, James "Whitey" Bulger, the Irish Mob boss of the Winter Hill Gang in Boston turned informant for the Federal Bureau of Investigation (FBI). He used this position to eliminate competition and consolidate power within the city of Boston which led to the imprisonment of several senior organized crime figures including Gennaro Angiulo, underboss of the Patriarca crime family. Infighting sometimes occurs within an organization, such as the Castellamarese war of 1930–31 and the Boston Irish Mob Wars of the 1960s and 1970s.

Today criminal organizations are increasingly working together, realizing that it is better to work in cooperation rather than in competition with each other (once again, consolidating power). This has led to the rise of global criminal organizations such as Mara Salvatrucha, 18th Street gang and Barrio Azteca. The American Mafia, in addition to having links with organized crime groups in Italy such as the Camorra, the 'Ndrangheta, Sacra Corona Unita and Sicilian Mafia, has at various times done business with the Irish Mob, Jewish-American organized crime, the Japanese yakuza, Indian mafia, the Russian mafia, Thief in law and Post-Soviet Organized crime groups, the Chinese triads, Chinese Tongs and Asian street gangs, Motorcycle Gangs and numerous White, Black and Hispanic prison and street gangs. The United Nations Office on Drugs and Crime estimated that organized crime groups held $322 billion in assets in 2005.

This rise in cooperation between criminal organizations has meant that law enforcement agencies are increasingly having to work together. The FBI operates an organized crime section from its headquarters in Washington, D.C. and is known to work with other national (e.g., Polizia di Stato, Russian Federal Security Service (FSB) and the Royal Canadian Mounted Police), federal (e.g., Bureau of Alcohol, Tobacco, Firearms and Explosives, Drug Enforcement Administration, United States Marshals Service, Immigration and Customs Enforcement, United States Secret Service, US Diplomatic Security Service, United States Postal Inspection Service, U.S. Customs and Border Protection, United States Border Patrol, and the United States Coast Guard), state (e.g., Massachusetts State Police Special Investigation Unit, New Jersey State Police organized crime unit, Pennsylvania State Police organized crime unit and the New York State Police Bureau of Criminal Investigation) and city (e.g., New York City Police Department Organized Crime Unit, Philadelphia Police Department Organized crime unit, Chicago Police Organized Crime Unit and the Los Angeles Police Department Special Operations Division) law enforcement agencies.

== Academic analysis ==
=== Criminal psychology ===
Criminal psychology is defined as the study of the intentions, behaviors, and actions of a criminal or someone who allows themselves to participate in criminal behavior. The goal is to understand what is going on in the criminal's head and explain why they are doing what they are doing. This varies depending on whether the person is facing the punishment for what they did, are roaming free, or if they are punishing themselves. Criminal psychologists get called to court to explain the inside the mind of the criminal.

==== Rational choice ====
This theory treats all individuals as rational operators, committing criminal acts after consideration of all associated risks (detection and punishment) compared with the rewards of crimes (personal, financial etc.). Little emphasis is placed on the offenders' emotional state. The role of criminal organizations in lowering the perceptions of risk and increasing the likelihood of personal benefit is prioritized by this approach, with the organization's structure, purpose, and activity being indicative of the rational choices made by criminals and their organizers.

==== Social learning ====
Criminals learn through associations with one another. The success of organized crime groups is therefore dependent upon the strength of their communication and the enforcement of their value systems, the recruitment and training processes employed to sustain, build or fill gaps in criminal operations. An understanding of this theory sees close associations between criminals, imitation of superiors, and understanding of value systems, processes and authority as the main drivers behind organized crime. Interpersonal relationships define the motivations the individual develops, with the effect of family or peer criminal activity being a strong predictor of inter-generational offending. This theory also developed to include the strengths and weaknesses of reinforcement, which in the context of continuing criminal enterprises may be used to help understand propensities for certain crimes or victims, level of integration into the mainstream culture and likelihood of recidivism / success in rehabilitation.

==== Enterprise ====
Under this theory, organized crime exists because legitimate markets leave many customers and potential customers unsatisfied. High demand for a particular good or service (e.g., drugs, prostitution, arms, slaves), low levels of risk detection and high profits lead to a conducive environment for entrepreneurial criminal groups to enter the market and profit by supplying those goods and services. For success, there must be:

- an identified market; and,
- a certain rate of consumption (demand) to maintain profit and outweigh perceived risks.

Under these conditions competition is discouraged, ensuring criminal monopolies sustain profits. Legal substitution of goods or services may (by increasing competition) force the dynamic of organized criminal operations to adjust, as will deterrence measures (reducing demand), and the restriction of resources (controlling the ability to supply or produce to supply).

==== Differential association ====
Sutherland goes further to say that deviancy is contingent on conflicting groups within society, and that such groups struggle over the means to define what is criminal or deviant within society. Criminal organizations therefore gravitate around illegal avenues of production, profit-making, protectionism or social control and attempt (by increasing their operations or membership) to make these acceptable. This also explains the propensity of criminal organizations to develop protection rackets, to coerce through the use of violence, aggression and threatening behavior (at times termed 'terrorism'). Preoccupation with methods of accumulating profit highlight the lack of legitimate means to achieve economic or social advantage, as does the organization of white-collar crime or political corruption (though it is debatable whether these are based on wealth, power or both). The ability to effect social norms and practices through political and economic influence (and the enforcement or normalization of criminogenic needs) may be defined by differential association theory.

=== Critical criminology and sociology ===
==== Social disorganization ====
Social disorganization theory is intended to be applied to neighborhood level street crime, thus the context of gang activity, loosely formed criminal associations or networks, socioeconomic demographic impacts, legitimate access to public resources, employment or education, and mobility give it relevance to organized crime. Where the upper- and lower-classes live in close proximity this can result in feelings of anger, hostility, social injustice and frustration. Criminals experience poverty; and witness affluence they are deprived of and which is virtually impossible for them to attain through conventional means. The concept of neighborhood is central to this theory, as it defines the social learning, locus of control, cultural influences and access to social opportunity experienced by criminals and the groups they form. Fear of or lack of trust in mainstream authority may also be a key contributor to social disorganization; organized crime groups replicate such figures and thus ensure control over the counter-culture. This theory has tended to view violent or antisocial behavior by gangs as reflective of their social disorganization rather than as a product or tool of their organization.

==== Anomie ====
Sociologist Robert K. Merton believed deviance depended on society's definition of success, and the desires of individuals to achieve success through socially defined avenues. Criminality becomes attractive when expectations of being able to fulfill goals (therefore achieving success) by legitimate means cannot be fulfilled. Criminal organizations capitalize on states with a lack of norm by imposing criminogenic needs and illicit avenues to achieve them. This has been used as the basis for numerous meta-theories of organized crime through its integration of social learning, cultural deviance, and criminogenic motivations. If crime is seen as a function of anomie, organized behavior produces stability, increases protection or security, and may be directly proportional to market forces as expressed by entrepreneurship- or risk-based approaches. It is the inadequate supply of legitimate opportunities that constrains the ability for the individual to pursue valued societal goals and reduces the likelihood that using legitimate opportunities will enable them to satisfy such goals (due to their position in society).

==== Cultural deviance ====
Criminals violate the law because they belong to a unique subculture - the counter-culture - their values and norms conflicting with those of the working-, middle- or upper-classes upon which criminal laws are based. This subculture shares an alternative lifestyle, language and culture, and is generally typified by being tough, taking care of their own affairs and rejecting government authority. Role models include drug dealers, thieves and pimps, as they have achieved success and wealth not otherwise available through socially-provided opportunities. It is through modeling organized crime as a counter-cultural avenue to success that such organizations are sustained.

==== Alien conspiracy/queer ladder of mobility ====
The alien conspiracy theory and queer ladder of mobility theories state that ethnicity and 'outsider' status (immigrants, or those not within the dominant ethnocentric groups) and their influences are thought to dictate the prevalence of organized crime in society. The alien theory posits that the contemporary structures of organized crime gained prominence during the 1860s in Sicily and that elements of the Sicilian population are responsible for the foundation of most European and North American organized crime, made up of Italian-dominated crime families. Bell's theory of the 'queer ladder of mobility' hypothesized that 'ethnic succession' (the attainment of power and control by one more marginalized ethnic group over other less marginalized groups) occurs by promoting the perpetration of criminal activities within a disenfranchised or oppressed demographic. Whilst early organized crime was dominated by the Irish Mob (early 1800s), they were relatively substituted by the Sicilian Mafia and Italian-American Mafia, the Aryan Brotherhood (1960s onward), Colombian Medellín Cartel and Cali cartel (mid-1970s - 1990s), and more recently the Mexican Tijuana Cartel (late 1980s onward), Mexican Los Zetas (late 1990s to onward), the Russian Mafia (1988 onward), terrorism-related organized crime Al-Qaeda (1988 onward), the Taliban (1994 onward), and Islamic State of Iraq and the Levant (ISIL) (2010s to onward). Many argue this misinterprets and overstates the role of ethnicity in organized crime. A contradiction of this theory is that syndicates had developed long before large-scale Sicilian immigration in the 1860s, with these immigrants merely joining a widespread phenomenon of crime and corruption.

==== Disorganized crime ====
The economist Peter Reuter has challenged the conventional framework of crime taking place in an organized manner with respect to drug trafficking. He argues that criminal organizations are unable to form monopolies and trend toward factionalism. Reuter and other skeptics have said that drug cartels and mafias are rhetorical constructs used by police and prosecutors to simplify a complex and heterogeneous criminal underworld that is in fact composed of smaller competing cliques and informal social networks.

== See also ==
- List of criminal enterprises, gangs, and syndicates
- Timeline of organized crime
- Global Organized Crime Index
