= Pai Wan-hsiang =

Pai Wan-hsiang (simplified Chinese: 白万祥; traditional Chinese: 白萬祥; pinyin: Bái Wànxiáng, 1920–2004) was Director of the Kuomintang's (KMT) overseas secret police, the so-called Mainland Operations Office (陸工會, Lu Gonghui), from 1979 to 1986. Pai is chiefly remembered as the person suspected of masterminding the assassinations of Taiwan pro-democracy dissidents such as Henry Liu (劉宜良) by KMT secret police. According to actor Jimmy Wang Yu, Pai approached him to ask him to assassinate Hsu Hsin-liang in America in the 80s.

== Life and career ==
In China, in 1939 Pai joined the Kuomintang's Three Principles of the People Youth Brigades and rose to the position of Branch Leader. After joining the army he worked in various capacities as an intelligence officer. In the Mainland Operations Office, Pai oversaw parts of the crackdown on dissidents in Taiwan and abroad after the Kaohsiung Incident. He died in the United States in 2004.
