= Tse Chi Lop =

Alleged boss behind Sam Gor crime syndicate

- Born: 謝志樂; 25 October 1963 (age 63); Guangzhou, Guangdong, China
- Other names: Tse Chi Lap; Brother No. 3; Sam Gor; T1; Ah Lap; Dennis; Xie Zii
- Citizenship: Canadian, Originally from China
- Occupations: Drug trafficker, cartel leader
- Status: Captured
- Wanted by: Australian Federal Police

Tse Chi Lop
- Traditional Chinese: 謝志樂
- Simplified Chinese: 谢志乐
Transcriptions
Standard Mandarin
- Hanyu Pinyin: Xiè Zhìlè
Yue: Cantonese
- Jyutping: Ze^{6} Zi^{3}-lok^{6}

Tse Chi Lop (Chinese: 謝志樂, born 25 October 1963) is a Chinese and Canadian gangster, drug trafficker and drug cartel leader. Before his arrest, Tse was the alleged drug lord behind Asia-Pacific based international crime syndicate Sam Gor, also referred to as "The Company", and a former member of the Hong Kong, Toronto and Vancouver-based triad crime group Big Circle Gang. Despite his extensive involvement in the illegal drug trade and a previous conviction, his criminal activities were unknown to the public until uncovered by a Reuters report in 2019.

A career criminal, Tse was involved with organized crime in his native city Guangzhou from a young age. He immigrated to Canada in 1988 and acquired Canadian citizenship through naturalization. After being involved in heroin trafficking from Southeast Asia to North America for years, Tse was first arrested in 1998 and sentenced to 9 years' imprisonment by a US court. After his release, he moved to Hong Kong in 2011, where he founded Sam Gor and entered the synthetic drug trafficking market. Known to be intelligent, humble and diplomatic, Tse's behind-the-scene innovation reshaped drug smuggling in the Asia-Pacific as he quietly accumulated tremendous wealth in the process.

In 2019, Sam Gor generated billions of US dollars each year from the trade in methamphetamine and other synthetic drugs. Through Sam Gor, Tse controlled nearly half of Asia-Pacific's drug market and over 70 per cent of Australian drug trade. Sam Gor is believed to be responsible for the dramatic shift in recent years away from opium-based drugs such as heroin and towards synthetics such as methamphetamine, ketamine and fentanyl in Asia-Pacific, and has been implicated in large shipments to Australia by law enforcement. As a result, Tse is frequently referred to as "the 'El Chapo' of Asia" by the media.

In contrast to other well-known drug cartel leaders, Tse kept a low profile despite living a rich lifestyle and was virtually unknown to law enforcement. His role was gradually unearthed through the captures of his associates. At the time of the Reuters' report in 2019, Tse became wanted in Australia for his involvements in controlling 70 percent of the local meth supply. After spending time in Taiwan under official surveillance during the COVID-19 pandemic-related border lockdowns, Tse was finally arrested by Dutch National Police in Amsterdam Airport Schiphol on 22 January 2021 while on a layover to re-enter Canada. He was extradited to Australia on 22 December 2022, and is awaiting trial.

== Early life ==
Tse was born in Guangzhou on 25 October 1963. He joined the Big Circle Gang, a criminal organization originated from Guangzhou and founded by youths who grew up under the Cultural Revolution, in his youth, and would continue to maintain his membership and connections with the group. He first moved to Hong Kong for a period before immigrating to Canada in 1988 with his fiancée; they settled in Toronto, Ontario and were married in 1989. In his early days in Toronto, Tse worked for Fujifilm and Kodak and made decent wages.

In Tse's 1998 statement given after his arrest, he claimed that his parents, as well as his in-laws, all moved to Canada after his immigration to be under his care due to their sickness, and that he had two children, one of whom was born with breathing problems. At the time of his arrest, Tse had acquired Canadian citizenship, however was reported as having lived in mainland China for a few years to oversee the heroin operation. He had been based in Hong Kong since 2011 until his arrest in 2021.

== Activity ==
=== Early years, heroin trade, and first arrest ===
Tse continued his association with the Big Circle Gang in Toronto at the time when the group was trying to become established in Canada the late 1980s. In his early years in Canada, Tse, then only a mid-level member, negotiated a business partnership with the Toronto branch of the Montreal-based Rizzuto crime family to smuggle high-purity and low-cost heroin into Canada from the Golden Triangle for distribution through the American Mafia's networks in the US and Italy. Such business partnerships were unusual as the Mafia at that time generally refused to routinely trade with Asian organised criminal groups, yet surveillance wiretaps by the Royal Canadian Mounted Police revealed Tse to be the point man and the Mafia's earliest Chinese business partner in the heroin trade. The venture became successful as the Big Circle Gang dominated the heroin market in Toronto and slashed prices by over 40 per cent in just two years while the Mafia expanded their distribution to as far south as Florida. Investigators described Tse as a person eager to embrace innovation and take risks, and his Toronto experience sharpened his diplomatic ability to "bridge [different] groups," a skill he would later rely on in building his criminal empire. By 1997, Tse would become the main person overseeing drug transport from Southeast Asia to Canada.

In 1995, the Federal Bureau of Investigation learned of Tse's identity and involvement through the indictment of Tse's New York-based partners, Chinese-Canadian Paul Kwok and Malaysian Chinese Yong Bing Gong, in 1995. The FBI coordinated with the RCMP for Tse's arrest, but Tse has already relocated to mainland China at the time, a country with which the US has no extradition treaty. The FBI was unable to pursue Tse until 1998 when he travelled to Hong Kong, where the US would extradite him based on existing treaties. Tse was arrested on 12 August that year by the Hong Kong Police Force and overseen by FBI and RCMP agents. He was extradited to the US by the end of that year and was denied bail. While in custody, Tse was described to be highly intelligent, with a "calm, friendly and strategically tight-lipped" demeanor, a "down-to-earth" personality, and a "legit" and gentleman-like presence, according to the FBI agent and prosecutor in charge of his case.

In a bid to escape a life sentence, Tse avoided trial by pleading guilty to one count of conspiracy to transport heroin. He carefully cooperated with prosecutors in order to avoid giving away too much information, showed great remorse during sentencing, and claimed that he intended to open a restaurant after his release in order to take care of his ailing parents and sick child. He was given a nine-year prison term and ended up only serving six before his deportation to Canada in 2006 to complete his three-year supervised release, in contrast with Gong's 27-year sentence. In 2002, Tse further requested a waiver of his legal fees as he claimed to only have US$1,500 and was "almost penniless," although the request was denied as prosecutors believed he had hidden assets. In total, Tse served almost nine years in prison, along with fellow Big Circle Boys associates, Wai Dai Cheung and Chung Wai Hung.

Tse served his sentence in the low-security Federal Correctional Institution, Elkton in Ohio. An inmate recalled that Tse was well-liked and known to be easy-going and humble.

=== Relocation and new venture ===
While in Elkton, Tse served with Lee Chung Chak, a Hongkonger drug trafficker with dual Chinese-British nationality with whom Tse would later found Sam Gor. Lee was arrested in 1994 at the Canada–United States border on the same charge, and would also end up being released in 2006. Lee would be later extradited to Australia in 2022 like Tse after his arrest in Thailand, owing to his involvements in Sam Gor's drug trafficking operations.

After his return to Canada, Tse shifted his interest to synthetic drug trade in the Asia-Pacific, as the demand of heroin has reduced and his existing Mafia-based North American distribution network had collapsed. Synthetic drugs, such as methamphetamine, has a higher profit margin, a simpler distribution network with less law enforcement presence, and an equally-steady supply from the Golden Triangle where he retained contacts. Following the end of supervision in 2010, Tse relocated to Hong Kong in 2011 with his family and formed Sam Gor that year. Business registration records showed that Tse and his wife established a shell corporation in Hong Kong that year with a residential address.

In Sam Gor's early years, Tse pioneered a "guaranteed delivery" system by which his organisation would replace any seized drugs free of charge. This reduced the risks in the drug trade and immediately became popular with criminal groups in Australia, where Tse would later become the biggest drug supplier.

Tse was also able to leverage his diplomatic skill to bring criminal groups previously at odds with each other. He successfully patched up the three long-opposing triads in Hong Kong: the 14K Triad, Wo Shing Wo and Sun Yee On. These three groups, along with Big Circle Boys and Taiwan's Bamboo Union, became the backbone of Sam Gor. He also recruited international criminal groups for Sam Gor's distribution network, from the Yakuza in Japan to the Satudarah and the Comanchero Motorcycle Clubs and the Lebanese mafia and other criminal families in Australia.

=== Market domination and personal wealth ===
By the late 2010s, Tse became the biggest drug dealer in the Asia-Pacific, controlling over 70 per cent of the Australian meth supply and was also the dominant drug distributor of Japanese, South Korean and Philippine drug markets. Overall, Sam Gor in its heyday had a 40 per cent to 70 per cent share of the US$90-billion-worth Asia-Pacific drug trade. During the same period, the United Nations Office on Drugs and Crime estimated that the Asia-Pacific drug market grew fourfold between 2014 and 2019, largely driven by the explosive growth of the Australian and New Zealand drug market from US$15-billion to US$61-billion in the same period. The proliferation of meth also sharply reduced its price by up to 70 percent in certain countries.

Although no exact figures exist, it is believed that Tse accumulated tremendous wealth through Sam Gor. In 2019, the UNODC estimated that Sam Gor generated between US$8-billion and US$17.7-billion in revenue from meth a year earlier and had "expanded at least fourfold in the past five years." An official from the UNODC said that Tse's achievement and wealth potentially rivaled those of well-known drug lords, including Pablo Escobar or Joaquín "El Chapo" Guzmán. Tse also operated an elaborate money laundry scheme using Australia-based Crown casinos which prompted a national inquiry in 2019.

During this time, Tse lived a lavish lifestyle in Hong Kong. He travelled only by private planes and hosted grand birthday parties in private resorts. He also hired eight Thai kickboxing bodyguards for his protection. A frequent gambler, Tse boasted having "Macao in [his] pocket" and once lost EUR 60-million in one night while visiting a casino there. Despite his low profile, Tse was sued in 2017 by Singapore-based Marina Bay Sands casino in a Hong Kong court as he was claimed to have owned SG$1.9-million in gambling debts.

== Downfall ==
=== Initial investigations ===
Tse first came to the attention of law enforcement in 2012. That year, the Australian Federal Police learned of a Hong Kong-based man named "Sam Gor" through wiretaps on a Melbourne-based greengrocer and drug distributor, Suky Lieu. In 2013, the AFP confirmed Sam Gor's identity as Tse through the surveillance on a Melbourne drug smuggling ring. While the ring leaders were in Hong Kong, the Hong Kong Police Force captured images of Tse's meeting with them and identified him for the AFP, which began to sketch out Tse's life.

Three years later, in 2016, a mid-level Taiwanese Bamboo Union member named Cai Jeng Ze was arrested in Yangon International Airport in Myanmar for carrying Ketamine. Burmese law enforcement agencies seized Cai's personal phone and found detailed documentation of Sam Gor's operations. After the contents were shared with the AFP, one of the investigators identified Tse from the photos taken with Cai's phone. The identity of Tse and other high-level members were further shared with Chinese and Taiwanese law enforcements. The multi-national cooperation that followed has resulted in the dismantling of Sam Gor's operations in Myanmar's Shan State and sea-based drug smuggling routes to Australia. It also resulted in the biggest drug bust in Australian history in 2017, when 1.2 tonnes of meth was seized in Geraldton, Western Australia.

On 14 October 2019, Tse's identity was finally revealed in an in-depth report from Reuters. Much of the article were sourced from the AFP, which also issued a notice with Interpol for his arrest around the time the article was published. However, the AFP would later learn that Tse obtained a copy of an internal document alerting him to this fact before the article broke.

=== Arrest and extradition ===
Following the report, Tse's operation began to fall apart as his associates started distancing themselves from him. However he continued to travel in the Greater China Area and Southeast Asia. A report from the Sydney Morning Herald alleged that Tse had been "residing" in Taipei "for several years." Prior to Tse's arrest, the AFP was wary of the fact that Tse might be hiding in Taiwan as his close ties with local officials would make his extradition difficult.

In early 2020, Tse entered Taiwan before the start of the COVID-19 pandemic. Facing pandemic-related travel restrictions, Tse extended his visitor status as was permitted under special measures. The National Police Agency then obtained a court order to put Tse under surveillance. Reports from a Taiwanese media indicate that he lived a quiet life in an upscale neighbourhood in Taipei and had hired bodyguards for his protection. Following the court order, Tse was interviewed by officers from Ministry of Justice Investigation Bureau in late 2020. The bureau determined that there was insufficient ground for his arrest, as Taiwan has no extradition treaty with Australia and he had not committed any offence in the country.

Nevertheless, the Taiwanese government deported Tse in January 2021 after refusing his application to further extend his stay. By then, Tse had been residing in Taiwan for around a year and was reported to be in a relationship with a Taiwanese woman. The Taiwanese government then notified Dutch and Australian officials of Tse's impending flights back to Canada, where he holds citizenship, via Amsterdam. During his extradition hearing, Tse's lawyer claimed that the Taiwanese government deliberately put him on a flight to the Netherlands instead of a nonstop flight to Canada "against his will" so he would be extradited in the Netherlands.

On 22 January 2021, Tse was arrested after stepping off his flight from Taiwan without incident. The AFP immediately started the process for his extradition from the Netherlands. The arrest was the culmination of Operation Kungur, led by the AFP with cooperation between Dutch and Taiwanese police, and supported by roughly twenty law enforcement agencies in Canada, China, Japan, Myanmar, Thailand, and the US (including the DEA). A high-ranking UNODC official said that Tse's arrest would change little as Sam Gor remains active, and that others can easily step in to replace him, as the conditions that facilitated drug smuggling has not been effectively addressed.

In July 2021 a Dutch court approved an order to extradite Tse to Australia to face trial. As of November 2021, the Australian government has only charged him with one count of drug smuggling, in connection with evidence obtained through the 2013 surveillance.

Tse was eventually extradited in December 2022 and was arraigned in the Melbourne Magistrates' Court within hours of his arrival in Melbourne. Tse was charged with conspiracy to traffic drugs from March 2012 and March 2013 with Suky Lieu and other defendants. He did not apply for bail. The trial of Tse was still pending as of August 2024.

In December 2025, Tse Chi Lop made a plea deal and was sentenced to 16 years in jail, with a non-parole period of 10 years. The nearly five years Tse has spent in custody were counted as time served. He will be eligible for parole in January 2031. During the sentencing proceeding, it was revealed that, under usual circumstances, Tse would have faced a potential maximum sentence of life in prison. However, as County Court judge Peter Rozen noted, an "unusual" deal struck between former Australian attorney-general Michaelia Cash and Dutch authorities for Tse’s extradition meant the maximum penalty could only be at most 25 years. Even that was cut short due to the discount resulting from the guilty plea.

== In popular culture ==
In November 2021 Discovery released a documentary on Tse titled The World's Biggest Druglord – Tse Chi Lop on Discovery+ as well as on its linear channels in South East Asia, Taiwan, Japan, Australia and New Zealand. He also features as a character in the New Zealand TV series Far North.
