= Tung Kuei-sen =

Taiwanese mobster

- Born: 1951; Taichung, Taiwan
- Died: April 3, 1991 (aged 39–40); USP Lewisburg, Lewisburg, Pennsylvania, United States
- Cause of death: Stab wounds

Tung Kuei-sen
- Traditional Chinese: 董桂森
Transcriptions
Standard Mandarin
- Hanyu Pinyin: Dǒng Guìsēn
Yue: Cantonese
- Jyutping: dung2 gwai3 sam1

Tung Kuei-sen (1951 - 3 April 1991) was a member of the Taiwan-based United Bamboo Gang. Along with Chen Chi-li and Wu Tun, he is best known for his murder of dissident journalist Henry Liu in Daly City, California in October 1984.

== Murder of Henry Liu ==
Chen and Wu had initially planned to murder Liu on their own by intercepting him at Fisherman's Wharf; after finding the area to be too crowded, they decided instead to attempt to attack him in his home, and enlisted Tung's help. After murdering Liu, Tung flew back to Taiwan with Chen and Wu, but was forced to flee to Manila a few weeks later during Operation Cleansweep a nationwide anti-gang raid. He fled Manila after being questioned by authorities there during an investigation of the contract murders of two Chinese Filipino families, going to Thailand, and then Brazil, where he was apprehended and in April 1986 extradited to New York City.

== Trial ==
Tung first stood trial in New York State on Federal racketeering charges relating to a United Bamboo conspiracy to smuggle 660 pounds of heroin into the United States. He pleaded guilty in that case and received a 20-year sentence. However, Tung was acquitted of similar racketeering charges relating to Liu's murder due to his testimony that he shot Liu on orders from the Taiwan government, and not as part of a gang-related activity. As Brazil's extradition treaty with the United States specified that they would not extradite fugitives charged with crimes that could result in their execution, the prosecutor did not seek the death penalty. After the first trial, he was extradited from New York to California to stand trial for Liu's murder. Like Chen, Tung stated that he had killed Liu for patriotic reasons. He was found guilty by a jury on 17 March 1988 after just 45 minutes of deliberations.

== Sentencing and imprisonment ==
Tung's sentence of 25 years to life for the murder and two years for the use of a firearm was passed on 12 May; the judge rejected a plea that his sentences be allowed to run concurrently, which could have seen him set free in just six years. According to prosecutors, he would not have been eligible for parole for 17 years and 8 months. He was then sent to Pennsylvania to serve out his term for the drug charges. On 21 February 1991, he was attacked and stabbed by fellow prisoners during a fight over cigarettes at the Lewisburg Federal Penitentiary in Lewisburg; after a long struggle to recover from his wounds, he died on 3 April. Inmate Jerome Cox later pleaded guilty to voluntary manslaughter for killing Tung and was sentenced to 10 years in prison.
