= Henry Liu =

Taiwanese-American writer and journalist

- 劉宜良
- Born: 7 December 1932; Jingjiang, Jiangsu, China
- Died: 15 October 1984 (aged 51); Daly City, California, U.S.
- Cause of death: Assassination
- Monuments: Newseum Journalists Memorial
- Education: National Chengchi University; American University
- Occupations: Journalist; Gift-shop owner
- Known for: Unauthorized biography of Chiang Ching-Kuo
- Notable work: 《蔣經國傳》 (1984)
- Spouse(s): Helen Cui (崔蓉芝; Cuī Róng Zhī (m. 1967)
- Children: 2

Chinese name
- Traditional Chinese: 劉宜良
- Simplified Chinese: 刘宜良
Transcriptions
Standard Mandarin
- Hanyu Pinyin: Liú Yíliáng
- Wade–Giles: Liu Yi-liang
Southern Min
- Hokkien POJ: Lâu Gî-liông

Pen name
- Chinese: 江南
- Literal meaning: "South of the Yangtze River" (cf. Jiangnan)
Transcriptions
Standard Mandarin
- Hanyu Pinyin: Jiāng Nán
- Wade–Giles: Chiang Nan
Southern Min
- Hokkien POJ: Kang Lâm

Henry Liu (Chinese: 劉宜良; pinyin: Liú Yíliáng; 7 December 1932 – 15 October 1984), often known by his pen name Chiang Nan (江南; Jiāng Nán), was a Taiwanese-American writer and journalist. He was a vocal critic of the Kuomintang (Chinese Nationalist Party), then the single ruling party of the Republic of China in Taiwan, and was most famous for writing an unauthorized biography of Chiang Ching-kuo, then president of the Republic of China. He later became a naturalized citizen of the United States, and resided in Daly City, California, where he was assassinated by Bamboo Union members who had been reportedly trained by the Kuomintang's military intelligence division.

== Biography ==
Liu was born on 7 December 1932 in Jingjiang, Jiangsu, Republican China. When he was nine years old, his father was killed by Communists. When he turned sixteen, he was drafted into the Nationalist Revolutionary Army, and he left for Taiwan in 1949. After leaving the military, he worked for the state-run radio and later as a reporter for the Taiwan Daily News, where he was sent on assignment to Hong Kong, Manila, and the Vietnam War. After marrying his wife Helen Cui Rong-zhi, he became a foreign correspondent in 1967, and moved to Washington DC, where he took graduate classes at American University and worked part-time as an interpreter for the State Department.

Later, his emigration to the United States was said to be motivated in part because he felt the government of Taiwan was suppressing him. He became a United States citizen in 1973–74, around the same time he left the Taiwan Daily News. After leaving the newspaper, Liu published articles, essays and books that were critical of the Chiang family and associated people, including Chiang Kai-shek, Soong Mei-ling, Chiang Ching-kuo, K. C. Wu and Wang Sheng, with books on Long Yun and K. C. Wu planned at the time he was assassinated.

Liu ran two gift shops in Fisherman's Wharf and San Mateo and was a freelance journalist for several publications in Hong Kong and the San Francisco Journal, a US-based Chinese-language newspaper published by Maurice Chuck. After publishing several articles about the Chiang family, he received a letter from General Wang Sheng warning him from publishing a biography of Chiang Ching-kuo. He proceeded to publish an unauthorized biography of Chiang Ching-kuo in 1975, which was formed from three articles he had written in 1975 about Chiang's life prior to 1949. Liu planned to update the biography to cover more recent history, but was once again warned against writing about the Chiang family by Admiral Wang Hsi-ling in 1977. Liu finally revised the biography after a meeting late in 1983 where he favorably received a suggestion to tone down the criticism of the Chiang family from a family friend, former intelligence agent, and his former publisher on the Taiwan Daily News, Hsia Hsiao-hua. Following the suggestion, Liu received US$17,000 (equivalent to $52,700 in 2025) from Taiwan.

== Assassination ==
On 15 October 1984, Liu was shot to death in the garage of his home in Daly City, California shortly after 9 a.m. Helen Cui, Henry's wife, had noticed two Asian men riding bicycles near their house that morning and the morning before; she heard loud noises in the garage and discovered her husband had been killed. The assassination had been planned by Chen Chi-li, leader of the Bamboo Union Triad, and carried out by two Bamboo Union members, Wu Tun and Tung Kuei-sen. Chen was acting on the request of the head of the Kuomintang's Military Intelligence Bureau, Vice Admiral Wang Hsi-ling, who had requested that Liu be "[given] a lesson" after writing articles critical of the Kuomintang government. Wu and Tung cornered Liu in his garage, and the three men struggled, ending after Wu shot Liu in the head and Tung shot Liu twice in the abdomen.

Some of Liu's friends suggested the "somewhat gossipy" biography of Chiang Ching-kuo delved into the background of Chiang Kai-shek's mother too deeply, while others suggested he was about to publish some works harmful to some governmental officials. Police ruled out robbery early in the investigation and an ROC spokesman denied government involvement.

=== Confession of Chen Chi-li ===
Preparations for the assassination of Liu started in July 1984, according to the tape-recorded confession of Chen Chi-li, leader of the Bamboo Union Triad. Earlier, in the wake of the 1979 Kaohsiung Incident, Chen had reorganized the Bamboo Union to assist the Kuomintang-led government in gathering information and suppressing dissidents. In July 1984, Chen and an unnamed "prominent Taiwan movie producer" received espionage training after being inducted into the service of military intelligence.

On 14 August 1984, Chen and the movie producer met with Vice Admiral Wang Hsi-ling, the head of the Kuomintang's Military Intelligence Bureau, and two of Wang's officials, Major General Hu Yi-min (胡儀敏) and Colonel Chen Hu-men (no relation). During the meeting, Chen Chi-li and the movie producer were told that Liu had betrayed the Republic of China as an agent of the People's Republic of China with his criticism.

Chen Chi-li and the movie producer arrived in the United States on 14 September 1984, but the producer unexpectedly backed out shortly afterward for personal reasons, leaving Chen Chi-li to recruit two other Bamboo Union members who had also recently arrived in the US to assist him in the assassination, Wu Tun and Tung Kuei-sen. Wu had left Taiwan earlier in September, after local police had found a gun in his tea shop. Tung had arrived in July to explore business opportunities in southern California. The original plot would have used local northern California Bamboo Union members to carry out the assassination, but the head of the San Francisco branch failed to meet them in late September as planned.

On 9 October 1984, Chen Chi-li and two other men drove from Los Angeles to San Francisco. Tung joined the group on 12 October 1984. Chen Chi-li was observed while conducting surveillance in Liu's Daly City neighborhood, being later identified as "the Asian man who couldn't speak English" by neighborhood children who had found him feeding candy to their lost dog on 13 October 1984.

After the assassination, Liu's killers fled to Los Angeles, where Chen Chi-li telephoned officials in Taiwan to confirm the hit prior to boarding a plane to Taiwan. After reading news accounts of the murder, Chen Chi-li realized he had been duped into believing that Liu was a communist agent, and he recorded his confession on 18 October 1984. The killers were reportedly offered US$20,000 (equivalent to $62,000 in 2025) each by Wang for the successful killing, but they refused the money.

Chen's October confession mentions the existence of a second recording of a conversation between Chen and "high officials" in the Kuomintang government. The FBI sought the second recording, but the existence of the second recording was never conclusively proven. Although the FBI did not comment officially, friends of Chen Chi-li claimed they were questioned about the whereabouts of the second recording, as well as about any links between Chen and Chiang Hsiao-wu.

== Legal actions ==
Chen and Wu were arrested in Taiwan along with 300 other members of the Bamboo Union during a 13 November 1984 government crackdown on organized crime. Chen reportedly confessed to his and Wang's roles while imprisoned, and two days later, on 15 January 1985, the three officials named in the confession were relieved of their duties and placed under arrest. At that time, an investigation by the FBI and Daly City police surfaced; they had been quietly questioning Los Angeles-area Bamboo Union members, seeking a copy of Chen's October recording. The government of Taiwan continued to deny culpability in the death of Liu, claiming that Wang and his subordinates were not acting as agents of the Taiwanese government. The existence of the tape-recorded October confession remained a rumor until the Los Angeles Times obtained a copy of the recording in March 1985 from Chang An-lo, a friend of Tung who had hosted him in September 1984.

Daly City Police Lieutenant Thomas Reese was allowed to interview Wu and Chen in prison, later filing an affidavit in January 1985 to support a warrant for Wu's arrest. The affidavit provided the motive for Liu's murder, with Wu stating that Chen had told him that "Liu had written some bad things about Taiwan and its president," and Chen had asked him to help "beat up or fix up" Liu.

Chen Chi-li's associates claimed that Chen was a close friend of Chiang Hsiao-wu, Chiang Ching-kuo's second son. Chiang Hsiao-wu was also claimed to have close ties to the Taiwanese security network, but Chiang denied both claims in a statement to the Times. Wang would later deny that Chiang Hsiao-wu was involved.

Chen and Wu had been in custody in Taiwan since November 1984, and the U.S. Federal Bureau of Investigation (FBI) was pushing for their return to the United States to face criminal charges. Daly City Police had requested the fingerprints and photographs of the suspects. Officials from Taiwan refused to remand the suspects to United States custody pending the results of their own investigation and possible trial, citing the fact that Taiwan and the US had no formal extradition treaty.

In March 1985, the FBI discovered the October tape recording made by chief hitman Chen Chi-li implicating Republic of China military intelligence in the killing, whereupon they began to pressure the government to bring Liu's killers to trial. The FBI investigation was confirmed by United States Attorney Joseph Russoniello. The investigation was conducted with the State Department serving as go-between for the FBI and the government of Taiwan. Meanwhile, the House of Representatives passed a non-binding resolution urging Taiwan to remand custody of the murder suspects to the United States for trial.

Chen and Wu went on trial in April 1985, with Tung being tried in absentia. The military tribunal of Wang and his subordinates followed in April 1985.

=== Criminal trials ===
At a pre-trial hearing in Taipei, Chen Chi-li claimed that Wang Hsi-ling of Kuomintang intelligence ordered the assassination, stating that Liu was a double agent who had spied for both Taiwan and China. However, Chen claimed he instructed his associates to disobey Wang's orders and instead wanted Liu to be injured, not killed, after learning that Liu's parents had been killed by Chinese communists. Chen and Wu were convicted in April 1985 and sentenced to life imprisonment, after tearfully begging to avoid the death penalty. In May 1985, a month after his conviction, Chen retracted this statement, stating that Wang had only ordered that Liu be taught a lesson, not killed, which brought Chen's story in agreement with Wang's testimony during his nearly-simultaneous military tribunal. The life sentences were upheld under two separate court rulings. Under Taiwan law, both Chen and Wu were eligible for parole after serving ten years of their sentence.

Meanwhile, Wang and his subordinates were subjected to a military tribunal. Two sessions were held; during the first, on 4 April 1985, Chen Chi-li was called to testify, where he and Wang sparred over who bore greater responsibility for Liu's death. During the second, Wang denied that he had authorized the killing, only that he had discussed the possibility of "giving [Liu] a lesson" and that his sole mistake was failing to inform his superiors that Chen was responsible when he learned of the killing, effectively shielding any higher governmental officials from blame. His subordinates stated they contacted Chen only at Wang's request and therefore bore no personal responsibility in following orders. The tribunal ended with no other witnesses called, resulting in Wang's April 1985 conviction and sentence of life imprisonment; his subordinates were each sentenced at the same hearing to two and a half years in prison for acting as accessories to the murder. The life sentence for Wang was upheld during a later review, although Wang was also eligible for parole after ten years.

Tung Kuei-sen had been rumored to be living in the Philippines, as he was not detained during the November 1984 Taiwan crackdown on Bamboo Union members when Chen and Wu had been arrested. Tung was eventually captured in Brazil in September 1985, and was extradited to the United States. He first stood for federal trial in 1986 in New York, where he was found innocent of racketeering but convicted of conspiring to import and distribute heroin. At the 1986 trial, Tung's defense attorneys argued that Tung had been duped into murdering Liu by appealing to his sense of patriotism. Tung testified that he was following government orders to assassinate Liu.

Following the trial in New York, Tung was extradited to California in March 1987 to stand trial for the murder of Henry Liu. Based on testimony that he had killed Henry Liu in the 1986 federal trial, Tung was ordered to stand trial in June 1987, with the actual trial commencing in March 1988, where despite his earlier testimony, he pleaded innocent to the murder charge. Tung testified during the trial that Chen Chi-li was relaying the order to kill Liu from Chiang Hsiao-wu, a "big boss," but he was found guilty of first-degree murder after just forty-five minutes of deliberation. Because Tung had been extradited from Brazil, he was not eligible for the death penalty. Instead, he was sentenced to twenty-seven years in prison, to run consecutively after the twenty-year federal sentence for drug smuggling charges. Tung was the only one of the six named conspirators to stand trial in the United States, despite State Department requests to have Chen Chi-li and Wu Tun stand trial as well.

Tung later filed an appeal for his murder conviction and sentence, which stated that the trial court should have requested a manslaughter verdict rather than murder, as he was acting out of patriotism. The appeal was rejected and his sentence upheld in 1990.

=== Summary of penalties ===
- Chen Chi-li, sentenced to life in prison (April 1985); commuted to 15 years and granted parole (January 1991)
- Wu Tun, sentenced to life in prison (April 1985); commuted to 15 years and granted parole (January 1991)
- Tung Kuei-sen, sentenced to 27 years to life in prison (May 1988); stabbed to death while in prison (1991)
- Wang Hsi-ling, sentenced to life in prison (April 1985); commuted to 15 years and granted parole (January 1991)
- Hu Yi-min, sentenced to 2.5 years in prison (April 1985);
- Chen Hu-men, sentenced to 2.5 years in prison (April 1985); after release, changed his name to Chen Yi-chiao (陳弈樵; Chén Yìqiáo) and later promoted to director of a Military Intelligence Bureau department

=== Civil suit ===
Liu's widow Helen filed a US$245,000,000 (equivalent to $733,410,000 in 2025) suit in a United States district court against the Republic of China and the six named conspirators, alleging that his murder had been arranged by Taiwanese officials acting in an official capacity. Although the suit survived an early motion to dismiss as an act of state grounds, Judge Eugene F. Lynch dropped Taiwan from the suit in 1987 based on Wang's military tribunal, which had concluded that Wang was not acting on behalf of the government of Taiwan, nor could his superiors have predicted his actions. The Ninth Circuit Court of Appeals reversed Lynch's decision, ruling (Liu v. Republic of China) that the ROC government was liable under the doctrine of respondeat superior; a petition for certiorari from the ROC government to the U.S. Supreme Court was subsequently rejected. The suit was finally settled out of court.

== Fallout ==
The assassination became a major political scandal in Taiwan, and American officials were critical of the Kuomintang for allegedly orchestrating an assassination on United States soil.

In a December 1985 speech, Chiang Hsiao-wu's father Chiang Ching-kuo declared ″If someone asks me whether anyone in my family would run for the next presidential term, my reply is, ′It can't be and it won't be.'" Prior to the Henry Liu murder, Chiang Hsiao-wu was the only one of Chiang Ching-kuo's sons mentioned as a potential successor to his father; the younger Chiang later served on the trade mission to Singapore, a move seen as soft exile.

== In popular culture ==
The assassination was the subject of the book Fires of the Dragon by David E. Kaplan. A fictionalized version of the assassination was portrayed in the 2009 film Formosa Betrayed.

== See also ==
- List of journalists killed in the United States
- Bai Wanxiang, who masterminded Liu's assassination
- Chen Wen-chen, another noted dissident who died under mysterious circumstances, potentially also a late example of White Terror suppression
- Lin Yi-hsiung, whose twin daughters and mother died after his arrest in another incident cited as an example of White Terror
- Kashmir Princess, another case of the Taiwanese government likely being involved in an overseas assassination
