= Liu Liankun =

Chinese major general executed for spying

- Born: 20 January 1933; Qiqihar, Heilongjiang, Manchukuo
- Died: 15 August 1999 (aged 66); Beijing, People's Republic of China
- Cause of death: Execution by lethal injection
- Citizenship: People's Republic of China
- Education: People's Liberation Army Logistics Academy
- Espionage activity
- Allegiance: Republic of China
- Service branch: People's Liberation Army General Logistics Department; Military Intelligence Bureau
- Service years: 1947–1999
- Rank: Major general

Liu Liankun (simplified Chinese: 刘连昆; traditional Chinese: 劉連昆) (20 January 1933 – 15 August 1999), was a major general (shaojiang) in the People's Liberation Army who provided the Republic of China (ROC) in Taiwan with secret intelligence about the status of missiles from the People's Republic of China (PRC). During the Third Taiwan Strait Crisis in 1996, the ROC Ministry of National Defense notified the public that the missiles launched by the PRC actually carried unarmed warheads. This tipped off Beijing that Taipei had a high-level mole working on the mainland. Liu, a top Chinese military logistics officer, was arrested, court-martialed and executed in 1999.

The ROC's Military Intelligence Bureau confirmed that Liu was one of its spies in 2018.

== See also ==
- Tong Daning
