= Chen Chi-li =

Taiwanese mob boss

- Born: 11 May 1943; Guang'an, Sichuan, Republic of China
- Died: 4 October 2007 (aged 64); St. Teresa's Hospital, Ma Tau Wai, Kowloon City, Hong Kong
- Resting place: Chin Pao San, New Taipei City, Taiwan
- Education: Tamkang University (BS)
- Known for: Leader of Bamboo Union; Murder of Henry Liu
- Children: 6

Chinese name
- Traditional Chinese: 陳啟禮
- Simplified Chinese: 陈启礼
Transcriptions
Standard Mandarin
- Hanyu Pinyin: Chén Qǐlǐ

Nickname
- Traditional Chinese: 鴨霸子
- Simplified Chinese: 鸭霸子
- Literal meaning: King Duck
Transcriptions
Standard Mandarin
- Hanyu Pinyin: Yā Bàzi

Chen Chi-li (Chinese: 陳啟禮; Wade–Giles: Chen^{2} Chi^{3}-li^{3}; 11 May 1943 – 4 October 2007), nicknamed King Duck or Dry Duck, was a Taiwanese gangster from China, best known for heading the United Bamboo Gang. His murder of dissident journalist Henry Liu in Daly City, California, United States, in 1984 has been described by the Financial Times as "the most prominent example of the Kuomintang's co-operation with gangsters in upholding its dictatorship".

== Biography ==
=== Early life ===
Chen was born in Sichuan to a father of Hunan origin and a mother of Jiangsu origin; his father was a civil servant with the Republic of China government. When the Kuomintang (KMT) Nationalist government fled from mainland China at the end of the Chinese Civil War in 1949, he followed his parents to Taiwan. There, he entered a school in which most of the students were born locally. As one of only three non-locals or waishengren in his class, he became a frequent target of bullying; he and fellow students with roots in the mainland began to form gangs for their own protection.

=== United Bamboo ===
He joined a local gang at 12, and United Bamboo Association (uniting all the "non-local" gangs to stand up against another local gang) was created a couple of years later; it was at this time that he acquired his nickname of "Dry Duck". While still a member of the gang, he went on to receive a bachelor's degree in engineering from Tam Kiang College (now Tamkang University), and served in the army as a lieutenant. He became the head of the gang in April 1968; under his leadership, its membership would grow to over a hundred thousand, making it the largest gang in Taiwan.

In 1970, he was sentenced to five years in jail for aggravated assault; he was sent to the infamous rehabilitation centre on Green Island, off the coast of Taitung County. Upon regaining his freedom in 1976, he turned his attention to business, establishing Cheng An Enterprise, which sold fire equipment; he grew CAE's market share to 70% in just three years, and soon expanded his activities to other industries such as electronics, stainless steel products, record production, nightclubs, and hydraulic engineering. In 1983, he even started a gang-related magazine which reported on the activities of Taiwan's various criminal groups.

=== Murder of Henry Liu ===
Chen claimed he received the order to kill Henry Liu on 14 August 1984, from KMT officials angered by Liu's authorship of a biography critical of Republic of China president Chiang Ching-kuo, the son of Chiang Kai-shek. They allegedly offered him a US$20,000 reward to carry out the murder, which he refused, instead agreeing to kill Liu without compensation out of "patriotism". For one month afterwards, he received training at the intelligence bureau's school at Yangmingshan, outside of Taipei, where intelligence officials gave him details of Liu's schedule and movements. During his training period, he also met with Chiang Hsiao-wu, son of Chiang Ching-kuo, whom he stated personally approved the killing.

Chen arrived in the United States on 14 September 1984. Chen and his associate Wu Tun had initially planned to murder Liu on their own by intercepting him at Liu's gift shop near Fisherman's Wharf; after finding the area to be too crowded, they decided instead to attack him in his home, and enlisted the help of Tung Kuei-sen, a fellow United Bamboo Gang member who was also in the area. The three ambushed Liu in his garage on 15 October 1984, where Wu and Tung shot him; a few days after the killing, Chen, Wu, and Tung all flew back to Taiwan together. Local police immediately suspected political motives, as Liu had not been robbed after he was killed; The New York Times noted that other critics of the KMT government had previously been killed in 1980 (the mother and twin daughters of Lin Yi-hsiung) and 1981 (Chen Wen-chen).

Chen was identified as "the Asian man who couldn't speak English" by neighborhood children after the shooting, as he was found feeding candy to their lost dog while he had been staking out Liu's home. Chen and Wu were arrested on 12 November 1984 in Taiwan as part of "Operation Clean Sweep", a large-scale campaign against organized crime. The United States Federal Bureau of Investigation (FBI) named Chen as the leader of the plot to murder Liu in late November 1984.

Chen made a tape-recorded confession on 18 October after he realized that officials had misled him about Liu's links to Communism; Chen emphasized he had not taken any payment for the murder, but was acting out of a deep sense of patriotism. After returning to Taiwan, he learned the government officials would not support him. Fearing that he would be betrayed, Chen had left the recorded confession with his associate, "Yellow Bird", in Houston, Texas, providing details and naming the officials behind the case, including Admiral Wang Hsi-ling, the head of Taiwan's Bureau of Military Intelligence. After the FBI obtained the tape from Chen's fellow gang members, the three officials named were arrested by Taiwanese authorities on 15 January 1985; the Taiwanese government also admitted the Bureau of Military Intelligence had been involved in the murder. The FBI issued a warrant for Chen's arrest and requested that he be extradited from Taiwan to stand trial in the United States; however, since formal diplomatic relations between the U.S. and Taiwan were discontinued in 1978, there was no extradition treaty in place.

At his 1985 trial in Taipei, Chen testified in more detail about the connection with the KMT, claiming that Admiral Wang had ordered him to kill Liu because Liu was a double agent, spying for both Taiwan and mainland China. Chen claims he disobeyed the order and instructed his associates to "teach [Liu] a lesson" and avoid killing or crippling him. Chen, Wang, and Wu were all sentenced to life in prison on 9 April 1985.

Jerome Cohen, then a professor of law at Harvard University, attended an administrative hearing for Chen and Wu on behalf of Liu's widow Helen Liu; he derided the trial as a "well-rehearsed performance", stating that the two read their statements from notebooks, and implied that their testimonies had been coached by the Taiwanese government, who sought to portray Wang as a rogue officer acting alone, and avoid other intelligence officials being implicated. The week after the trial, the U.S. House of Representatives passed by a vote of 387-2 a non-binding resolution (H.Con.Res. 110) calling on Taipei to extradite Chen and Wu to the United States to stand trial there; the "nay" votes came from Bob Stump (R-AZ) and Howard C. Nielson (R-UT). Taipei rejected the request the following day. Less than two months after his conviction, Chen retracted his accusations against Wang.

Chen, Wang, and Wu were given clemency by the Taiwanese government and released in January 1991. He and Wu were treated as "heroes" by the media and the public; Chen declared his intention to transform the United Bamboo Gang into a legitimate business enterprise, and established Chuan An Construction, which was successful not only in the booming construction industry on Taiwan, but also made large investments outside Taiwan as well, including an RMB10 billion resort project in Hunan's Moon Lake area.

=== Exile and death ===
Five years after his release, Chen fled to Cambodia to avoid further organized crime-related charges in Taiwan under Operation Chih-ping, a police operation which sought to round up various gang figures. He had just been diagnosed with cancer, and his doctor had advised him to go somewhere relaxing and avoid stress. He married Chen Yi-fan in a ceremony there in 1998. In July 2000, he made news again after being arrested for illegal possession of firearms; the Cambodian police had moved against him after Taiwanese television stations broadcast images of him showing off his guns. Chen claimed the guns had been purchased for self-defense in the aftermath of the 1997 coup by Hun Sen. He lived quite luxuriously in Cambodia, alone in his 2,600 square metres (28,000 sq ft) villa, while his wife and children remained in Taiwan.

Chen was hospitalised at St. Teresa's Hospital of Hong Kong in August 2007 due to the worsening of his pancreatic cancer; he remained there until his death in October of that same year. His body was flown back to Taiwan on 18 October. Fellow Liu killer Wu Tun, with whom Chen had remained friends, helped to organise his funeral; over three thousand people came to pay their respects. Among the mourners were major politicians from both the blue and green camps such as Wang Jin-pyng of the Kuomintang and Ker Chien-Ming of the Democratic Progressive Party, as well as various celebrities of whom the most prominent was popular singer Jay Chou; they suffered harsh criticism for their attendance, including a Taipei Times editorial, which characterised the politicians' presence as "revolting" and stated that Chou "should be ashamed, but we are not sure if he has the depth of character to feel it." Chou, who showed up wearing sunglasses and left after only 20 minutes, had become acquainted with Chen through his son Baron Chen, with whom Chou had previously worked in the filming of Kung Fu Dunk. Other attendees, including black-clad teenagers and those carrying knives and firearms, were turned away by the hundreds of police who came out to the funeral to maintain order. A total of fourteen United Bamboo Gang members were arrested in connection with the funeral.

== Personal life ==
Chen had been married three times. From the three women he had three sons and three daughters, including actor Baron Chen.
