= Bamboo Union =

Taiwanese criminal Triad

- Founded: 1957
- Founder: Chen Chi-li "King Duck"
- Founding location: Taiwan
- Years active: 1960s–present
- Territory: Taiwan, China, United States, Britain, Australia, Canada and France
- Ethnicity: Largely Sinitic-Taiwanese, Taiwanese American
- Membership: 20,000 members
- Leader: Liu Chen-nan "the Bump Forehead"
- Activities: Drug trafficking and contract killing

The United Bamboo Gang (UBG; Chinese: 竹聯幫; pinyin: Zhúliánbāng), also known as the Bamboo Union, is the largest of Taiwan's three main criminal Triads. They are reported to have roughly 20,000 members. The membership consists largely of waishengren (Mainland Chinese) and has had historic ties to the Kuomintang; they are said to be motivated as much by political ideology as by profit. They are known to simply call themselves "businessmen", but in reality, are also involved in organized killings and drug trafficking. The gang gained global notoriety when it became directly involved in politics in the early 1980s.

The Bamboo Union has Taiwanese American and other ethnic groups of Asian American members.

== History ==
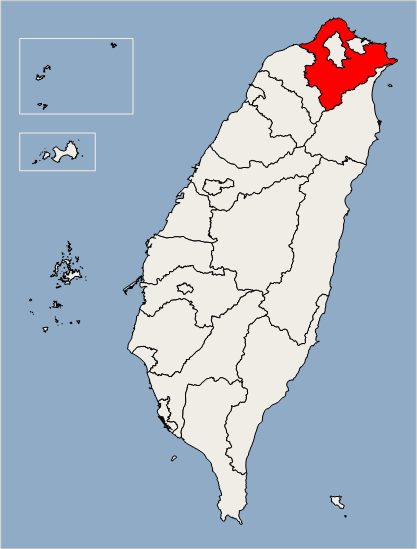
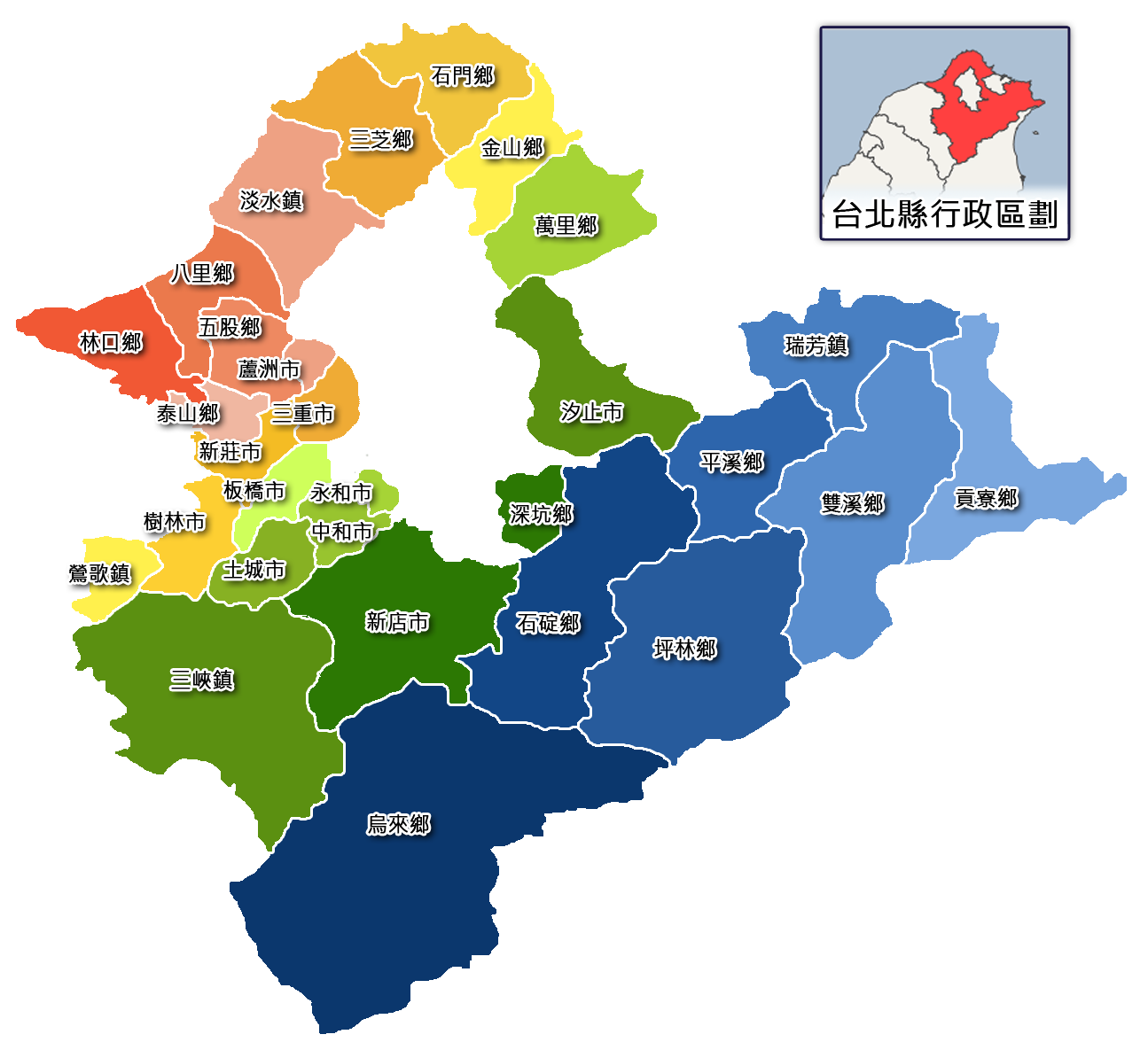
Taipei County

The Bamboo Union was formed in 1957 by waishengren children who wanted to protect themselves from threats by majority Hoklo children. The first members lived on Bamboo Forest Road in Jung Ho City, Taipei County, now Yonghe District of New Taipei City. Its first members were made up of mainland Chinese teens who joined to secure a place in Taiwan after 1949. The mainland Chinese were regarded as an unwelcome minority that was rejected by Hoklo citizens following the end of the Chinese Civil War, when the Nationalist Kuomintang (KMT) government led by Chiang Kai-shek fled to Taiwan. Although the Nationalist Republic of China government continued to hold claims on mainland China after 1949, the mainland was controlled by the Chinese Communist Party, and Taiwan was controlled by the KMT. The Bamboo Union criminal gang began primarily with street-fighting to gain recognition in society.

By the late 1960s, the aspirations of the Bamboo Union membership shifted from street-fighting to profiteering. The gang began making a name for itself in the "protection" business and extorting money from local shops and factories, but the gang's treasury overflowed when thousands of well-paid American GIs flocked to Taipei while on R&R from the Vietnam War. Chinese nightclub owners welcomed Bamboo Union members to their premises to banish rival gangs of ethnic Taiwanese trying to carve out a share of the lucrative trade in gambling, prostitution, and drugs. By this stage, the Bamboo Union was fast developing into a transnational crime syndicate or "triad". For example, leader Chang An-lo, nicknamed "White Wolf," moved to Las Vegas in 1968 to study and keep order of the Bamboo Union's expanding empire, particularly in the Chinatowns of California and the gambling halls of Las Vegas.

The Bamboo Union was closely associated with the KMT and the ruling Chiang family. The Bamboo Union was a key part of the KMT's White Terror which allowed the Dictator Chiang Kai-shek to establish control over Taiwanese society. In 2020 government documents from the Taiwan Garrison Command were declassified which shed new light on the closeness of these ties. These documents revealed that before the mid-1980s Bamboo Union gangsters had been knowingly employed by Taiwanese government agencies including the National Security Bureau and the Intelligence Bureau. Gangsters also served as close aides to Chiang Hsiao-yung. Bamboo Union gangsters were even admitted to military, police, and intelligence academies by the KMT, this allowed gangsters to rise to the very top of government.

In the early 1980s, the gang became even more powerful when they joined hands with the "Iron Blood Patriots" to carry out missions overseas. In return, both gangs were offered a great share of the heroin trade that expanded into the world market. This deal made the Bamboo Union very powerful in Taiwanese politics and social culture, but they were also being watched by major countries like the United States. The gang's powerful relationship with the "Iron Blood Patriots" came to an end after journalist Henry Liu was murdered on 15 October 1984. In the 1980s the gang was sold a large quantity of firearms by the corrupt governor of a province of the Philippines.

=== Notable cases ===
In 1980, the daughters and mother of one of the leading members of the opposition, Lin Yi-hsiung, were brutally killed in their home. The following year, Chen Wen-chen, a Taiwan-born statistics professor teaching at Carnegie Mellon University, was killed and his body dumped in the grounds of National Taiwan University. At around the same time, the dissident journalist Henry Liu wrote an unauthorized critical biography of Chiang Ching-kuo, the president of Taiwan. Liu was assassinated in 1984 by members of the Bamboo Union who were subsequently caught and convicted. His murderers, one being "King Duck" Chen Chi-li, were sentenced to life in prison, although Chen and most of the others convicted were paroled by 1991; Tung Kuei-sen was stabbed to death while in prison in 1991; he was the only one convicted for participating in or planning the murder who was not eventually paroled.

In July 2009, Bamboo Union hitman Bai Xiao Ye stabbed and slashed a man to death in a Las Vegas, Nevada karaoke bar and wounded two others. In 2013, Bai was sentenced to life imprisonment without parole. Bai had also been charged with fatally shooting a man and wounding another at a Los Angeles karaoke bar. In October 2015, the Bamboo Union was linked to the kidnapping of Hong Kong businessman Wong Yuk-kwan.

=== Death of Chen Chi-Li ===
One of the most significant events that have taken place in the Bamboo Union's legacy was the death and funeral of their former leader Chen Chi-li. The former leader had maintained a very complicated relationship between the criminal organization and the Chinese Nationalist (Kuomintang) regime. He died of cancer in 2007 and his funeral brought more than 10,000 mourners. His mourners included a number of politicians from Taiwan's still-young democracy which has struggled to shrug off long-standing links to the criminal underworld. Fellow gangsters said that Chen did not understand why the government would treat a patriot like him as a criminal. He was not a normal gangster, but an idealist who had made money to do the right thing. Representatives of Taiwan's three main criminal organizations, the Bamboo Union, the Four Seas Triad and the Celestial Way, were on hand to pay their respects to Mr. Li. Members of Japan's yakuza, dressed in black suits, were also among the guests, while representatives from crime families of Hong Kong, Macau, Malaysia and Thailand also joined the procession under the watchful gaze of thousands of police. More than 1,000 police officers were assigned to monitor and videotape the movements of the mourners, a number of whom are 'big brothers' of local gangs. The family spent NT$2 million (HK$475,000) to charter a China Airlines Airbus plane to transport the body, plus friends and relatives to Taiwan. According to local news media, the family spent at least NT$20 million to make sure Chen's funeral was held in grand style.

== Organization ==
Unlike Japan's yakuza or Italy's mafia, the United Bamboo does not have a strict rank-and-file. Twenty-four members are each led by a big brother or "da ge" with membership comprising gangland enforcers and individual businessmen. Due to its structure, United Bamboo and its activities usually fly below the radar. Mutual benefits and obligations underpin the relationships within the gang, as members who may not do business with one another will turn to one another in times of crisis. All members paid homage to Chang, who was "recognized" by Taiwan's triads as their "opinion leader" in 1995 and who was held in such esteem that legitimate businessmen ask him to help settle disputes.

The gang has a "code of ethics" that has ten rules that all members must follow. The mainland branch of the Bamboo Union is disciplined and well organized, complete with rank systems, promotions, and benefits. Senior gang figures are given the honorific suffix "Da Ge", or "Big Brother". According to the junior Bamboo Union "boss" Big Brother Su, the gang is divided into approximately 13 divisions, or tang kou, with names such as "Tiger Division" and "Dragon Division". Within those 13 divisions, there are 68 branches of members. The Bamboo Union is understood to partner with the Japanese yakuza and multi-ethnic triads like Sam Gor syndicate, and the leaders of these groups including Tse Chi Lop, both for drug trafficking and money laundering.

=== Leaders (official and acting) ===
Historical leadership of Bamboo Union
| Spiritual leaders | | | | | Functional leaders | | | | | Refs |
| Start | End | Name | Nickname | Image | Start | End | Name | Nickname | Image | Refs |
|---|---|---|---|---|---|---|---|---|---|---|
| | | | | | 1957 | 1964 | Chao Ning 趙寧 | | | |
| | | | | | 1964 | 1972 | Yang Chien-ping 楊劍平 | "Master Yang" | | |
| 1968 | 1995 | Chen Chi-li (Note: Also functional leader from 1976 to 1995) 陳啟禮 | "King Duck" | | 1964 | 1972 | Yang Chien-ping 楊劍平 | "Master Yang" | | |
| 1968 | 1995 | Chen Chi-li 陳啟禮 | "King Duck" | | 1972 | 1975 | Chang An-lo 張安樂 | "White Wolf" | | |
| 1968 | 1995 | Chen Chi-li 陳啟禮 | "King Duck" | | 1972 | 1976 | Chou Jung 周榕 | "King Chou" | | |
| 1968 | 1995 | Chen Chi-li 陳啟禮 | "King Duck" | | 1976 | 1995 | Chen Chi-li 陳啟禮 | "King Duck" | | |
| 1995 | 1999 | Huang Shao-tsen 黃少岑 | "Yao Yao" | | 1995 | 1999 | Huang Shao-tsen 黃少岑 | "Yao Yao" | | |
| 2001 | 2007 | Chao Erh-wen (Note: Acting leader) 趙爾文 | "King Chao" | | | | | | | |
| 2001 | 2007 | Chao Erh-wen 趙爾文 | "King Chao" | | 2002 | 2006 | Li Tsung-kuei 李宗奎 | "Zhong Kui" | | |
| 2001 | 2007 | Chao Erh-wen 趙爾文 | "King Chao" | | 2006 | 2009 | Hu Tai-fu 胡台富 | "Monkey King" | | |
| 2007 | 2025 | Huang Shao-tsen (Note: Second stint as leader) 黃少岑 | "Yao Yao" | | 2006 | 2009 | Hu Tai-fu 胡台富 | "Monkey King" | | |
| 2007 | 2025 | Huang Shao-tsen 黃少岑 | "Yao Yao" | | 2010 | 2025 | Huang Shao-tsen 黃少岑 | "Yao Yao" | | |
| 2025 | present | Liu Chen-nan 劉振南 | "the Bump Forehead" | | 2025 | present | Liu Chen-nan 劉振南 | "the Bump Forehead" | | |

== Illegal activities ==
Because of the mainland origins of its membership, the Bamboo Union developed close links with military intelligence and security agencies. It participates in many illegal activities like security services, debt collection, loan sharking, gambling dens, hostess clubs, restaurants, and small businesses. It is known internationally for drug smuggling, human trafficking, and silencing journalists as far away as Northern California.

== See also ==
- 14k
- Criminal tattoos
- Green Gang
- List of Chinese criminal organizations
- Organized crime
- Russian mafia
- Tiandihui
- Tong
- Triads
- Yakuza
