= Sam Gor =

Asian crime syndicate

Sam Gor (The Company)
- Years active: 1988–2022
- Territory: Asia-Pacific
- Ethnicity: Chinese, Burmese, Thai, Vietnamese, Cambodians, Laotians
- Leaders: Tse Chi Lop, Lee Chung Chak
- Activities: Drug trafficking
- Allies: 14K; Bamboo Union; Big Circle Gang; Sun Yee On; Wo Shing Wo; Yamaguchi-gumi; United Wa State Army; Lebanese mafia Comancheros; Hells Angels

Sam Gor
- Traditional Chinese: 三哥
- Simplified Chinese: 三哥
Transcriptions
Standard Mandarin
- Hanyu Pinyin: sāngē
Yue: Cantonese
- Yale Romanization: sāam gō
- Jyutping: saam1 go1

Sam Gor (Chinese: 三哥), also known as The Company, is an international crime syndicate based in the Asia-Pacific. The organization is made up of members of five different triads: 14K, Bamboo Union, Big Circle Boys, Sun Yee On and Wo Shing Wo. Sam Gor is understood to be headed by Chinese-Canadian Tse Chi Lop, who was arrested in January 2021 in the Netherlands. The syndicate is primarily involved in drug trafficking, earning at least $8 billion per year.

Sam Gor is alleged to control between 40 and 70% of the Asia-Pacific methamphetamine market, while also trafficking heroin, ketamine and synthetic drugs, and precursor chemicals. The group is active or working with organized crime partners in a variety of countries, including Cambodia, Laos, Myanmar, Thailand, New Zealand, Australia, Korea, Japan, China, Taiwan and Vietnam. Sam Gor previously produced meth in Southern China and is now believed to manufacture mainly in the Golden Triangle, specifically Shan State, Myanmar, responsible for much of the massive surge of crystal meth in recent years.

== Leadership ==
The group is understood to be headed by Tse Chi Lop, a gangster born in Guangzhou, China. Tse is a former member of the Hong Kong-based crime group, the Big Circle Gang. In 1988, Tse immigrated to Canada and built the foundations of this syndicate in Toronto. In 1998, Tse was convicted of transporting heroin through Canada into the United States in partnership with the Rizzuto crime family which was the dominant North American Italian Mafia family at the time. Tse served nine years behind bars with fellow Big Circle Boys associates Wai Dai Cheung and Chung Wai Hung. Tse has been compared in prominence to Joaquín "El Chapo" Guzmán and Pablo Escobar. Tse has been wanted for years and subject to an Interpol notice since 2019 after he was named publicly. Tse was arrested en route to Canada from Taiwan during a stopover in Amsterdam on 22 January 2021. The Australian Federal Police (AFP) was seeking his extradition from the Netherlands to face trial. In July 2021 a Dutch court approved an order to extradite Lop to Australia to face trial. He was eventually extradited in December 2022 to face charges in Australia.

The arrest was the culmination of the multi-year Operation Kungur, led by Australia and supported in different ways by twenty law enforcement agencies with interests in the case including from Canada, China, Hong Kong SAR, Japan, Macau SAR, Myanmar, New Zealand, Thailand, and the US (including the DEA). Taiwan's Ministry of Justice Investigation Bureau assisted. It remains unclear how he was able to live without detection or arrest in Taiwan after being publicly named in 2019. Raising concerns about the influence of organized crime in the region after the arrest, UNODC Regional Representative Jeremy Douglas commented "It's a great result...[b]ut the organisation remains". He added, "...while taking down syndicate leadership matters, the conditions they have effectively used in the region to do business remain unaddressed, and the network remains in-place. The demand for synthetic drugs has been built, and someone will step in to replace Tse."

== Organization ==
Sam Gor is made up of 14K, Wo Shing Wo, Sun Yee On, Big Circle Gang and Bamboo Union. The group does business with many other local crime groups such as the Yakuza in Japan and the Comanchero Motorcycle Club and Lebanese mafia in Australia.

A June 2020 Canadian news article stated that factories run by major organized crime groups, located on or near the borders of Myanmar, Thailand and Laos, were "protected by private militias". In spite of the COVID-19 pandemic, the production and trafficking of synthetic drugs and chemicals continues at record levels in the region.

The United Nations Office on Drugs and Crime estimated that Sam Gor generated between $8 billion and $17.7 billion in revenue from meth in 2018 and that the triad had "expanded at least fourfold in the past five years".

In October 2020, Lee Ching Chak was arrested in Bangkok, Thailand. In 2022 he was extradited to Australia.
