= Big Circle Gang =

Chinese triad

- Founded: 1970s
- Founding location: China
- Years active: 1970s-present
- Territory: Hong Kong, Guangzhou, Malaysia, United States, Canada, Australia
- Ethnicity: Chinese
- Criminal activities: Racketeering, Murder, drug trafficking, child trafficking, human trafficking, child prostitution, intimidation, extortion, money laundering, contract killing
- Allies: United Nations (gang); The Company; American Mafia; Red Wa; Fujian gangs Wo Shing Wo; Menace of Destruction; Asian Boyz; MS-13; Netas
- Rivals: 14K Triad; Bloods; Piru Street Boys; Crips; East Side Longos; 211 Crew; Soldiers of Aryan Culture; Aryan Circle; Aryan Brotherhood; Nazi Lowriders; Aryan Nations, Lynwood Vikings

Big Circle Gang
- Traditional Chinese: 大圈幫
- Simplified Chinese: 大圈帮
Transcriptions
Standard Mandarin
- Hanyu Pinyin: Dájuānbāng
Yue: Cantonese
- Yale Romanization: Daaih-gyuhn Bōng
- Jyutping: daai^{6} hyun^{1} bong^{1}

Big Circle Boys
- Traditional Chinese: 大圈仔
- Simplified Chinese: 大圈仔
Transcriptions
Standard Mandarin
- Hanyu Pinyin: Dájuānzǎi
Yue: Cantonese
- Yale Romanization: Daaih-gyuhn Jái
- Jyutping: daai^{6} hyun^{1} zai^{2}

The Big Circle Gang or Big Circle Boys is a Chinese triad. In 2009, the Big Circle Boys were described as "one of the largest and most sophisticated criminal conspiracies" in Canada.

The gang established in the prison camps of China in the late 1960s before relocating to Hong Kong in the 1970s. They were given the moniker "Big Circle Gang" and were formed by former members of the Red Guards, a paramilitary organization established by Mao Zedong during the Cultural Revolution. After Mao eventually ordered a crackdown on the Red Guards using the People's Liberation Army (PLA), many former members of the organization were imprisoned in China. However, some former Red Guards fled as refugees to Hong Kong, where they "turned their military prowess to crime", according to a Canadian court record, forming the triad known as the Big Circle Gang.

== Origins ==
In 1968, Mao turned against the Red Guards he had formed in 1966 as part of the "Great Proletarian Cultural Revolution". The Red Guards, notorious for their cruelty and destructive antics, had become too violent even for Mao. A number of Red Guards were arrested and sent to prison camps as Mao now disavowed them for following his orders. The former Red Guards were imprisoned in squalid camps around the city of Guangzhou to be "reeducated", where they formed a gang that competed with the millions of other prisoners for food. In Chinese maps, prison camps were marked with a red circle, which led to the gang adopting the red circle as their symbol.

Between 1969 and 1975, a number of the former Red Guards turned Big Circle Boys were released or escaped, most fled to the British colony of Hong Kong. The general amorality and cynicism of the Big Circle Boys came from their disillusionment with Mao's government for being sent to prison camps for merely following their orders. In Hong Kong, the Big Circle Boys were known for their clannish qualities formed out of common experiences in the Red Guard and in the prison camps, well planned raids, use of guns in their crimes and their extreme violence. The gang targeted jewelry stores, payroll offices, and casinos. The Royal Hong Kong Police gave the gang the nickname of dai huen jai (Cantonese for "Big Circle Boys"), a nickname that stuck.

== Expansion ==
The gang expanded out of Hong Kong in the 1980s, settling operations in the Netherlands and Great Britain. The gang also became active in the Lower Mainland of British Columbia and in the greater Toronto area in Canada. The Big Circle Boys were the first triad to originate in the People's Republic of China that operated in Canada, as the prior triads came from Hong Kong or Taiwan. Some of the Big Circle Boys came to Canada as illegal immigrants owing to their lengthy criminal records in Hong Kong, but came legally by claiming refugee status. By the late 1980s, the Big Circle Boys were notorious in the Chinatowns of both Vancouver and Toronto for their armed robberies of businesses, home invasions, and their practice of kidnapping wealthy Chinese-Canadians to force their families to pay hefty ransoms.

== Methods ==
The Big Circle Boys use some of the traditional ranks, rituals and iconography of the triads, which date to the 17th century. The triads were founded as "patriotic societies" to resist the Manchu Qing dynasty that conquered China in 1644. To fund their anti-Qing revolution, the triads turned to crime, which ultimately led them to abandon their original revolutionary mission for gangsterism. The triads tended to feature elaborate iconography, which recalls their 17th century origins as the "patriotic societies". The Canadian criminologist Steven Schneider wrote: "They are devoid of the structure, initiation ceremony, formal membership or rituals that characterize the traditional triads." The Big Circle Boys are more of a brand than a formal gang, consisting of numerous gangs made up of 10-30 people scattered around the world that are united by their common use of the red circle symbol. The strength of the Big Circle Boys is in the international networking as the Big Circle Boys have members in China, the United States, Canada, the United Kingdom, and all over the world.

By the early 1990s, the Big Circle Boys had moved up from robberies to more profitable crimes as prostitution, human trafficking, drug smuggling, loansharking, credit card fraud, and the counterfeiting of currency, computer software, and films. The Big Circle Boys dominate digital piracy of films and music in Canada along with the counterfeiting and real estate fraud. Sergeant Jim Fisher, an Asian crime expert with the Vancouver police service in a 1998 interview called the Big Circle Boys a sophisticated gang who operate very much like businessmen and learn from their mistakes. Fisher recalled arresting one Big Circle Boy who had the entire transcript of his trial for credit card fraud with him as he was studying how the Crown convicted him.

Using connections in Asia, the Big Circle Boys were involved in smuggling heroin from the "Golden Triangle" nations of Burma, Thailand and Laos into Canada, the United States and Europe. The Big Circle Boys would sell the heroin at a markup to Chinese or Vietnamese street gangs who performed the most dangerous and least profitable part of the drug trade. Kon Yu-lueng, aka "Johnny Kon", a Big Circle Boy based in New York City was described by the Drug Enforcement Agency as "probably one of the two or three biggest heroin dealers in the world". In 1985, two couriers from Hong Kong were arrested at Seattle International Airport with 97 kilograms of heroin. One of the couriers fled back to Thailand where he was murdered and another refused to turn state's evidence and name as his employer, leading to him being sentenced to a lengthy prison term. Both couriers worked for Kon. Kon was arrested in 1988 and charged with smuggling 453 kilograms of heroin into the United States between 1984 and 1987.

In December 1990, the Vancouver police broke up a human smuggling ring led by the Big Circle Boys were bringing in illegal immigrants from China to Canada. The Big Circle Boys were manufacturing false passports in Canada, which were mailed to China with fraudulent entry stamp. The Big Circle Boys charged $20,000 Canadian dollars for each forged passport. Almost all of the illegal immigrants to Canada were people with criminal records in China who wanted to come to Canada because of its justice system. China imposes the death penalty for a number of criminal offenses while in Canada the standard punishment for people convicted of even serious crimes is only a few years in prison, making Canada an attractive place for Chinese criminals. In the early 1990s, the Big Circle Boys in Toronto under the leadership of Tse Chi Lop who had arrived in Canada in 1988, was said to have formed an alliance with the Vito Rizzuto, the boss of Montreal's Rizzuto family along with the Columbian Cali Cartel and the 'Ndrangheta. The Big Circle Boys brought heroin from the Golden Triangle in southeast Asia to sell in the United States and Europe and cocaine from Columbia to sell in Canada and Asia.

The triad now thrives among the unregulated factories and underground banks of Guangdong, and especially in the city of Guangzhou; they were nicknamed the "Big Circle Gang" after a drawing on a map indicating in which part of China they operated.

They spread rapidly across Canadian cities in the 1990s, and confidential informants say Big Circle Boys are trusted bonding agents among many actors in fluid networks of Asian drug-trafficking. They controlled much of the heroin trade in central China and now control a vast percentage of the heroin and fentanyl distribution business in the United States and Canada. The Big Circle Boys are a transnational-organized crime syndicate.

On 22 January 2021, as part of Operation Kungur, Dutch police arrested Tse Chi Lop, alleged to have assumed the leadership of the organisation and having taken it to higher levels as Sam Gor (The Company), with the UN's Office on Drugs and Crime putting the larger syndicate's turnover at $8–18 billion in 2018.

== See also ==
- Canadian property bubble

== Books ==
- Schneider, Stephen (2009). Iced: The Story of Organized Crime in Canada (2nd ed.). Toronto: John Wiley & Sons. ISBN 978-0470835005.
