= Military Intelligence Bureau =

Taiwanese intelligence agency

- 軍事情報局

Agency overview
- Formed: 1985
- Preceding agency: Bureau of Investigation and Statistics
- Jurisdiction: Republic of China
- Headquarters: No. 74, Ln. 62, Sec. 1, Zhicheng Rd., Shilin., Taipei
- Agency executive: Yang Jing-se, Director
- Parent agency: Ministry of National Defense General Staff Headquarter
- Website: https://www.mnd.gov.tw/en/Publication/85026

The Military Intelligence Bureau (MIB; Chinese: 國防部軍事情報局; or TMIB) is an intelligence agency directly under the General Staff Headquarters of the Ministry of Defense of the Republic of China. Its main task is to collect information about China's political and military activities, and it is also the only espionage operative unit of Taiwan.

The Military Intelligence Bureau was reorganized and established after the Jiangnan case in 1985, its predecessor being the Intelligence Bureau of the Ministry of National Defense.

== Mission ==
The mission of the Military Intelligence Bureau is to collect political and military intelligence on China, and even when necessary to plan espionage operations of sabotage, assassination, psychological warfare. In addition, the MIB's special missions include the timely establishment of post-enemy forces, incite defection and psychological warfare against the PLA. At present, the MIB is still the primary intelligence agency against the People's Republic of China, although it sometimes conducts espionage operations on other countries.

== Training ==
Through external recruitment and selection of suitable intelligence personnel, the MIB conducts spy training courses once a year, with about 120 students in each session, and the courses are divided into "basic" and "specialized" programs. Specialized training includes special intelligence combat techniques of intelligence collection, file creation, camouflage, transformation. All trainees use pseudonyms. In addition, trainees are trained in martial art, shooting, parachuting, radio communication, cryptography, code-breaking, and other special training.

After the training is completed, intelligence agents are not sent overseas directly, but are sent by the MIB to alternative counties and cities for identity coverage. During the short term of Director of Military Intelligence Bureau Luo Demin in 2021, a higher percentage of in-unit training with out-of-town will be required. Moreover, the intelligence agents of sending abroad will be prepared to cover their identities by changing in the name of schooling or family business. As a covert intelligence agency, the MIB does not publicly disclose information about intelligence operations.

The MIB played an effective role in the early period because there was no contact between the two sides of the Taiwan Strait, and the collection of newspapers and internal documents of the Chinese Communist Party was still of some value. After the reform and opening up, it became easier to obtain information. On the contrary, key information is more difficult to collect than before.

== History ==
=== Predecessor ===
The predecessor of the Military Intelligence Bureau was established in 1954 as the Intelligence Bureau (Note: 國防部情報局), and after 1985, the "Intelligence Bureau" was merged with the "Special Military Intelligence Office" (Note: 國防部特種軍事情報室) to form the Military Intelligence Bureau in response to the changing times.

=== 1950s to 1980s ===
During the 1950s, the Secrets Bureau (Note: 保密局) (the predecessor of the Intelligence Bureau) was a secret agency of the Kuomintang, and planned several assassination attempts against Chinese Communist Party politicians. For example, in 1955, the Director of the Intelligence Bureau Mao Renfeng led an unsuccessful attempt to assassinate Zhou Enlai in the bombing of the Kashmir Princess. The Intelligence Bureau denied any involvement in the plot until 40 years later when retired Kuomintang Major General Gu Zhengwen (Note: 谷正文), who was involved in the bombing, admitted in China Times that the incident was planted by Taiwanese secret agents who bribed the cleaner to set bombs at Hong Kong's Kai Tak Airport.

After the mid-1950s, the Intelligence Bureau sent agents into mainland China by airdrop or other circuitous means to infiltrate and operate in coastal areas. In October 1964, immediately after the first nuclear bomb test of the People's Republic of China, the Intelligence Bureau sent a number of agents from Hong Kong to infiltrate into China to collect atomic bomb-related secrets in a mission called "Operation God's Axe" (Note: 神斧行動).

After the 1980s, the two sides of the Taiwan Strait opened up exchanges. The MIB changed its strategy from assassination to psychological warfare, incite defection, and incitement. In 1985 alone, China intercepted more than 600 pieces of propaganda sent by Taiwan's intelligence agencies from Hong Kong, Japan, and the United States to major universities.

In October 1984, the Jiangnan case occurred. A Chinese writer Henry Liu was murdered in the U.S. by a mob leader, Chen Chi-li, who was specially trained and dispatched by the Intelligence Bureau. The case was solved by the Federal Bureau of Investigation, causing an impact on American public opinion. Chiang Ching-kuo was forced by the U.S. government and public opinion to merge the Intelligence Bureau with the Special Military Intelligence Office since the following year, and put them under the jurisdiction of the General Staff Headquarters, which is now the Military Intelligence Bureau. Since then, the Military Intelligence Agency has been under the command of Taiwan's national security system.

=== Taiwan Strait Missile Crisis ===
From 1995 to 1996, the Taiwan Strait Missile Crisis broke out and the PLA conducted large-scale military exercises in the Taiwan Strait. The military intelligence bureau was also working behind the scenes to conduct information tasks. However, Lee Teng-hui said at a press conference that the PLA's missiles were not live bullets, but blanks. This alerted Chinese national security authorities to the existence of spies, resulting in the arrest of senior PLA generals and those who provided insider information. The "Shao-Kang Project" (Note: 少康專案) was thus exposed, and both Shao Zhengzong (Note: 邵正宗) and Liu Liankun were confirmed to have been turned by the MIB.

=== After 2000 ===
In order to promote the referendum after Chen Shui-bian came to power, he accidentally stated in public the exact number of missiles that China had deployed against Taiwan, including 96 ones in Jiangxi Leping, Jiangxi Ganxian and Guangdong Meizhou; 144 in Fujian Yong'an; 64 in Fujian Xianyou, and the number kept increasing. Such precise intelligence immediately alerted the Chinese national security authorities, so they quickly arrested a group of Taiwanese businessmen who were acting strangely. Within half a month, the Chinese Ministry of State Security arrested 36 spies involved in the case, and another PLA major general, Liu Guangzhi (Note: 劉廣智), was arrested in what was considered the most serious espionage case since the founding of the People's Republic of China, and the spy network deployed by the Military Intelligence Bureau was nearly emptied.

In 2013, the Jingzhi program was announced. The intelligence operations of the Military Intelligence Bureau were transferred from the National Security Bureau to the supervision of the General Staff Headquarters.

== Organizational structure ==
The MIB is tightly organized and has 7 divisions, an intelligence research center, and a secret transportation center. The structure is as follows.

- Division 1: Planning the overall intelligence operation plan.
- Division 2: Intelligence research and guidance.
- Division 3: Supervise the development, personnel, work, and guidance of Taiwanese overseas bases.
- Division 4: Post-enemy intelligence development and dispatch.
- Division 5: Supervision of post-enemy force organization and development.
- Division 6: In charge of psychological warfare strategy and tactics.
- Electronic Combat Division: in charge of radio wave detection, communication interception, and decryption codes.

Transportation Center: in charge of liaison with the enemy and overseas bases, including the designation of liaison methods, the delivery of communication materials, and the entry and exit of intelligence personnel.

Intelligence Research Office: responsible for technical intelligence analysis.

=== Reorganization after 2020 ===
After 2020, the establishment of the MIB was changed to five in order to prevent infiltration and establish intelligence breakpoints. The structure is as follows.

- Division 1: Northeast Asian Affairs.
- Division 2: Southeast Asian Affairs.
- Division 3: Taiwan's home and outer islands.
- Division 4: European, American and Australian Affairs.
- Division 5: Intelligence Research, which is also the largest division.

== Activities in foreign countries ==
=== Ukraine ===
According to sources, intelligence chief Yin Zongwen broke through Russia's international intelligence network and sent four pilots to Ukraine in early 1996 to try out a SU-27 fighter jet.

In 2004, the Canadian magazine Kanwa Intelligence Review revealed further insider story, reporting that the Taiwanese Air Force had sent pilots to Kyiv to test-fly the Su-27SK and had received some assistance from Ukrainian experts in tactical training, as well as attempting to obtain information on maintenance parts for the second-hand fighter. Taiwan's eagerness to obtain the performance parameters of the PLA's mass-imported Su-27SK led to an intense military intelligence war between Taiwan and China in Ukraine.

On April 30, 2004, the MIB issued a gag order on the report and refused to comment on it.

== See also ==
- Ministry of Justice Investigation Bureau
- National Security Bureau (Taiwan)
- Political Warfare Bureau
- Republic of China Military Police
- Taiwan Garrison Command

== Note ==
Titles in Chinese.
