= List of massacres in Taiwan =

The following is a list of massacres that have occurred in Taiwan:

Name	Date	Location	Deaths	Notes
Lamey Island Massacre	April–May 1636	Liuqiu Island	300	By Dutch soldiers
Guo Huaiyi rebellion	1652-09-07 & 1652-09-11	Tainan	4.000+	by Dutch soldiers
Nerbudda incident	1842-08-10	Tainan city	197	by Qing Dynasty
Mudan incident	1871-12-18	Taiwan Prefecture, Fujian Province	54	by Paiwan Formosans
Beipu uprising	1907-11-14	Beipu village	100+	by Japanese army
Musha Incident	1930-10-27	Musa village	134	by Seediq rebels against Japanese occupation
February 28 incident and White Terror	1947-02-28	entire Taiwan main island	18,000-28,000	by Republic of China Army
July 13 Penghu Incident	1949-07-13	Penghu	7+ (Initial casualties of July 13 unknown)	By Republic of China Armed Forces
Nantou shooting	1959-09-21	Nantou City	11 (including the perpetrator)	By Li Hsing-ju (李兴儒)
Li Shing Junior High School Shooting	1962-01-26	Taipei	7	By Tsui Yin (崔荫)
Lee We incident	1962-04-05	Taipei	10	By Lee We (李某)
Civil Air Transport Flight 106	1964-06-20	village of Shenkang	57	By Zeng Yang (曾旸) and Wang Zhengyi (王正义)
Taipei bus attack	1964-08-30	Taipei	3	By Ho Chung-ming (何忠明)
Taichung massacre	1965-01-24 & 1965-01-25	Taichung	7 (including the perpetrator)	by Hsiao
Mou family massacre	1965-08-22	Taipei	6	by Chou Shin-Hsiang (周信祥)
China Airlines Flight 825	1971-11-20	Penghu	25	by unknown
Lin family massacre	1980-02-28	Taipei	3	by unknown
1987 Lieyu massacre	1987-03-07	Lieyu, Kinmen	19 or more	by Republic of China Army
Min Ping Yu No. 5540 incident	July 21–22, 1990	Aodi, Yilan County, Taiwan Province	25	By Taiwan Garrison Command
Lunqing Western Restaurant fire	1993-01-19	Taipei	33	by unknown
Carlton Barber's Shop fire	1993-05-12	Taipei	21 (including the perpetrator)	by Liang Hsin-teng (梁兴登)
Murder of Liu Pang-yu	1996-11-21	Taoyuan	8	by Two Killers
Luzhou fire	2003-08-31	New Taipei City	16	by Xu Ruiqin (徐瑞琴)
Beimen of Xinying Hospital fire	2012-10-23	Tainan	13	by Lin Jixiong (林基雄)
2014 Taipei Metro attack	2014-05-21	New Taipei City	4	by Cheng Chieh (郑捷)
Weng Renxian arson case	2016-02-06	Taoyuan	6	by Weng Renxian (翁仁贤)
2016 Taoyuan bus fire	2016-07-19	Taoyuan	26 (including the perpetrator)	By Su Mingcheng(苏明成)
2021 Kaohsiung building fire	2021-10-14	Kaohsiung	46	by Huang Gege (黄格格)
Chen Yanxiang arson case	2022-06-15	Hsinchu City	8	by Chen Yanxiang(陈彦翔)
2025 Taipei stabbings	2025-12-19	Taipei	4 (including the perpetrator)	by Chang Wen (張文)
