= July 13 Penghu Incident =

Instance of human rights abuse during the White Terror

July 13 Penghu incident
- Part of White Terror (Taiwan)
- Native name: 七一三澎湖事件
- Date: July 13, 1949; 77 years ago
- Location: Penghu, China
- Type: Forced conscription by the Republic of China
- Outcome: Two principals and five students executed, unknown number of students killed
- Deaths: 7+ (Initial casualties of July 13 unknown)

The July 13 Penghu Incident (Chinese: 七一三澎湖事件), also known as the Penghu 713 Incident, and the Penghu Shandong Yantai United High School Incident, occurred during the Republic of China's (ROC) White Terror in 1949. Thousands of students who had fled to the ROC during the communist takeover of mainland China were sent to Penghu and the male students forciby conscripted as soldiers. When they launched protests, several students were stabbed with bayonets, then two high school principals and five students were publicly executed, with rumors that other students had been tied in burlap bags and thrown into the sea.

== Incident ==
Around 5000 students and teachers had fled the Chinese Civil War from Shandong in mainland China and were relocated to the Penghu archipelago near the island of Taiwan. The students were promised that they could continue to study, while serving as part-time soldiers, but instead the authorities began forcibly conscripted the male students as full-time soldiers.

Student protests broke out on July 13 and were violently suppressed by the military. Some protesters were stabbed with bayonets at the orders of Penghu Defense Command-in-Chief Lee Cheng-chin (李振清).

Principals Chang Min-chih (張敏之) and Tsou Chien (鄒鑑) tried to notify higher authorities of the abuses. Teachers Tsou Chien (鄒鑑) and Chang Min-chih (張敏之) also tried to protect their students. In response, the military immediately arrested them and hundreds of students. The prisoners were tortured into making false confessions of being communist spies.

About 40 were tried in Taipei. Two principals and five students were publicly executed; their deaths were announced on December 12.

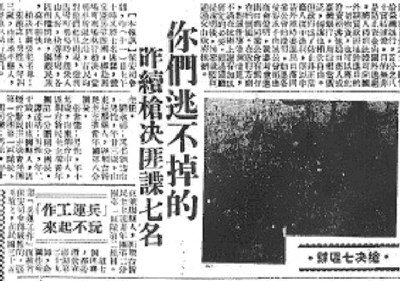
News article discussing the seven executions

== Aftermath ==
In August 2009, the government erected a monument at the Penghu Guanyin Temple (馬公觀音亭) in honor of the victims.

On July 13, 2019, the 70th anniversary of the event, an exhibition commemorating the incident opened at the National Human Rights Museum of Taiwan. The exhibition was hosted at the Penghu Reclamation Hall in Penghu and later at the Jing-Mei White Terror Memorial Park in Taipei.

In 2023, the National Human Rights Commission reported that survivors' convictions had been overturned and they were awarded compensation.
