= Taipei Muslim Cemetery =

Muslim cemetery in Xinyi, Taipei, Taiwan

- 六張犁回教公墓
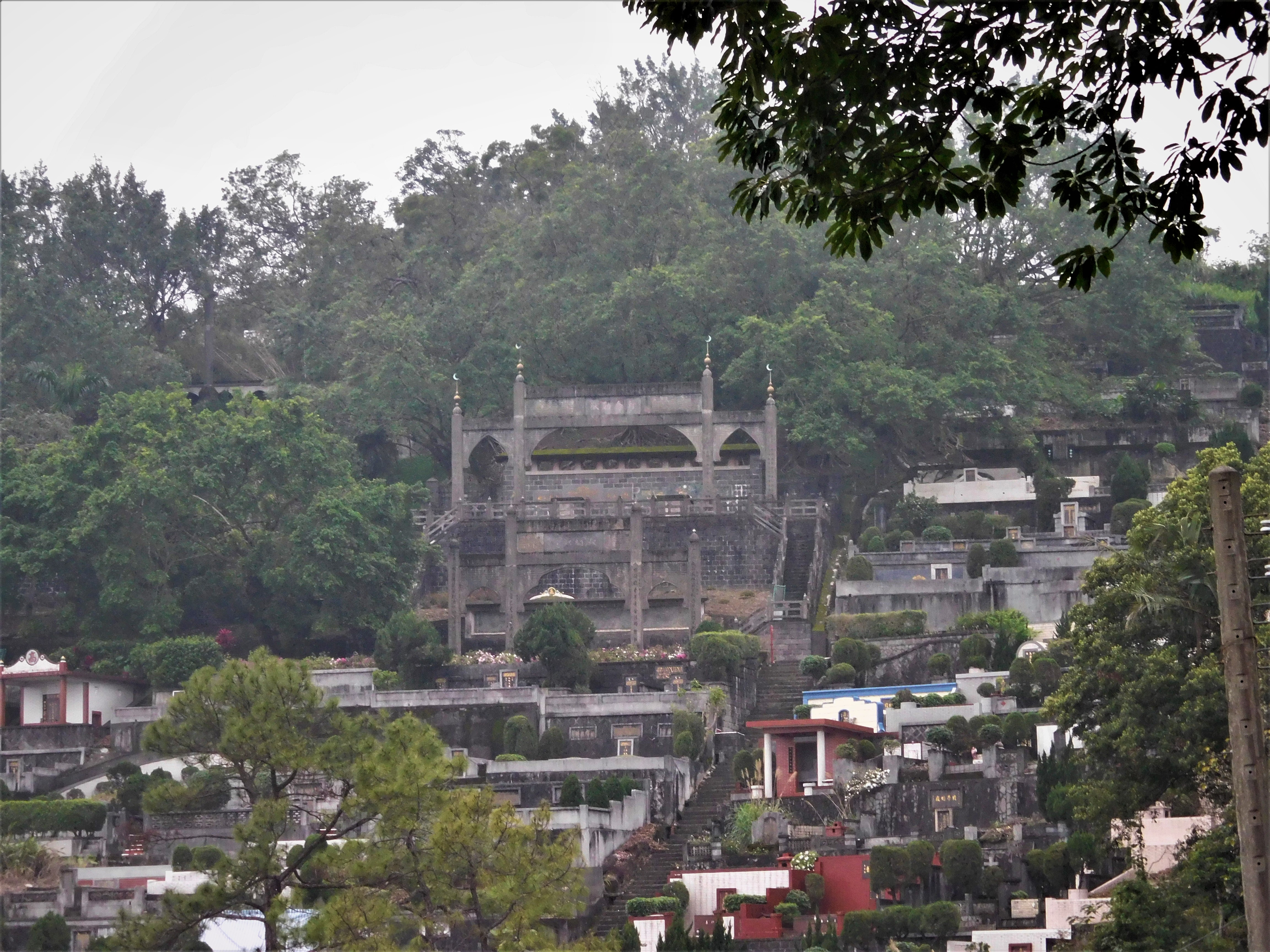
- Interactive map of Taipei Muslim Cemetery

Details
- Established: 1950s
- Location: Xinyi, Taipei, Taiwan
- Coordinates: 25°01′9.3″N 121°33′47.59″E
- Type: Muslim cemetery

Liuzhangli Islamic Cemetery (traditional Chinese: 六張犁回教公墓; simplified Chinese: 六张犁回教公墓; pinyin: Liùzhānglí Huíjiào Gōngmù), alternatively known as the Taipei Muslim Cemetery, is the largest and only Islamic cemetery in the Xinyi District of Taipei, Taiwan.

== History ==
The cemetery was established in 1950 by Muslim soldiers and refugees, who had arrived in Taipei from mainland China after the fall of the Republic of China (ROC) to the Chinese Communist Party (CCP) during the Chinese Civil War. During the White Terror that started in 1947 and ended in 1992, victims of this period of political repression were interred in the lower parts of the cemetery, regardless of their religion. Later in 1963, former ROC Minister of Defence Bai Chongxi commissioned the establishment of a private family burial ground, Bái Róngyìntáng Mùyuán, within the cemetery for his deceased wife. Bai himself was buried in this part of the cemetery upon his death in 1966. Uyghur general Yulbars Khan, who fought on the side of the Kuomintang (KMT) during the Chinese Civil War, was also buried in the cemetery in 1971, with a domed tomb built atop his grave.

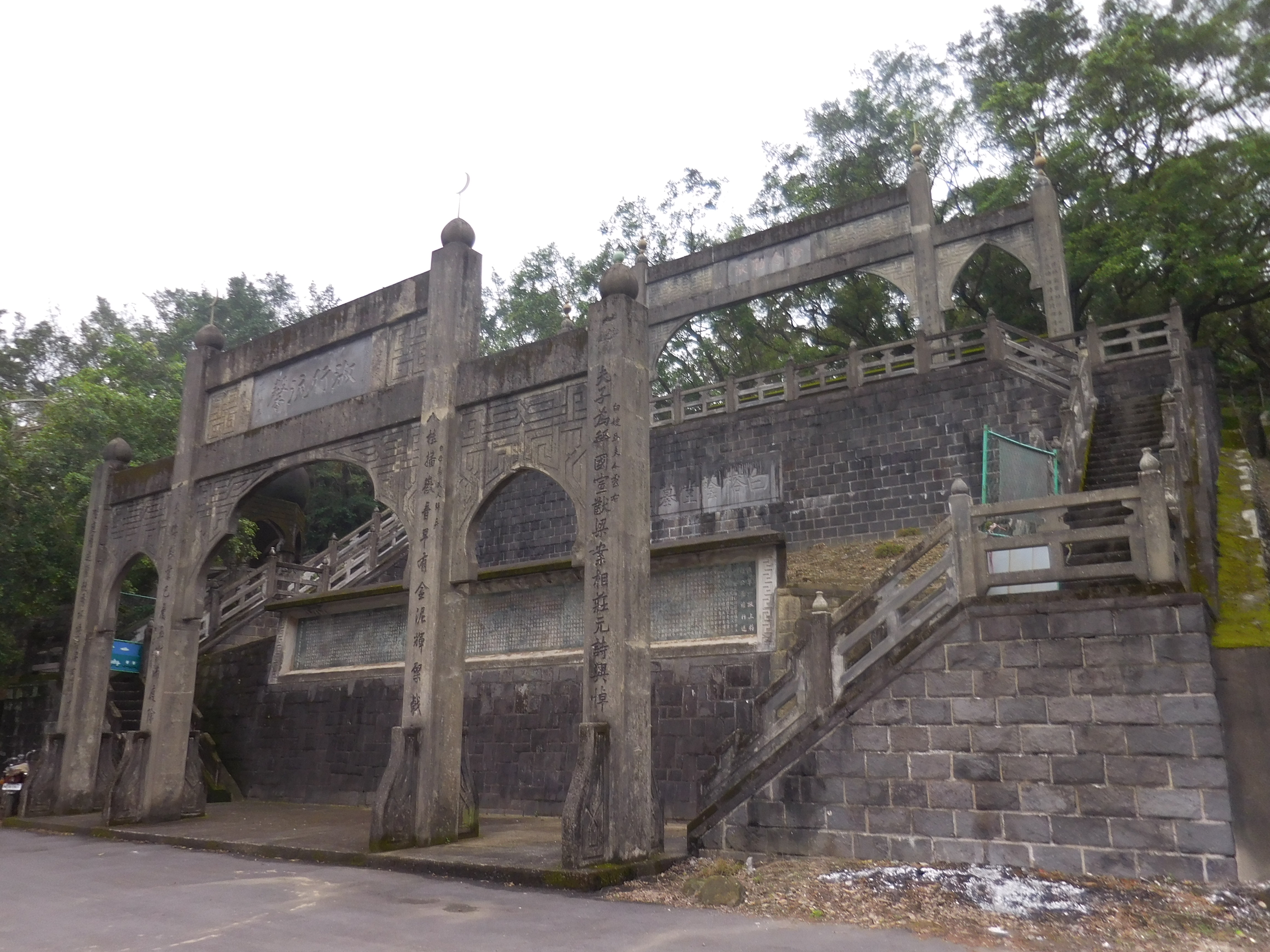
The entrance to the Bái Róngyìntáng Mùyuán, which was designed by one of Bai Chongxi's sons.

In 2003, a memorial to the victims of the White Terror was established in the cemetery. This memorial park was built around a section of 206 graves which included that of Huang Rong-can, a Chinese artist best known for his prints depicting the brutal persecutions under the KMT.

In 2012, it was discovered that the Bái Róngyìntáng Mùyuán section of the cemetery was built without a paid license or permit, hence making it an illegal structure as Bai Chongxi did not obtain any authorisation from the KMT to establish the burial ground. Regardless, the tomb of Bai Chongxi was officially declared as a heritage site of the Muslims in Taiwan, as well as a historical monument of the country. Plans to develop the cemetery into a Muslim heritage park centred around the tomb of Bai Chongxi were also confirmed in March 2013 by politician Hau Lung-pin, who was then running as the Mayor of Taipei.

== Architecture ==
The general design of the entrances and gates in the cemetery incorporate the elements of a mosque, with decorative domes and minarets. It also features memorial steles with inscriptions by various politicians and some other historic figures, even from Chiang Kai-shek himself. The Bái Róngyìntáng Mùyuán part of the cemetery was designed by a son of Bai Chongxi, featuring domed pavilions and Arabic style arches.

== Notable burials ==
- Bai Chongxi (1893–1966)
- Huang Rong-can (1920–1952)
- Yulbars Khan (1889–1971)

== Gallery ==
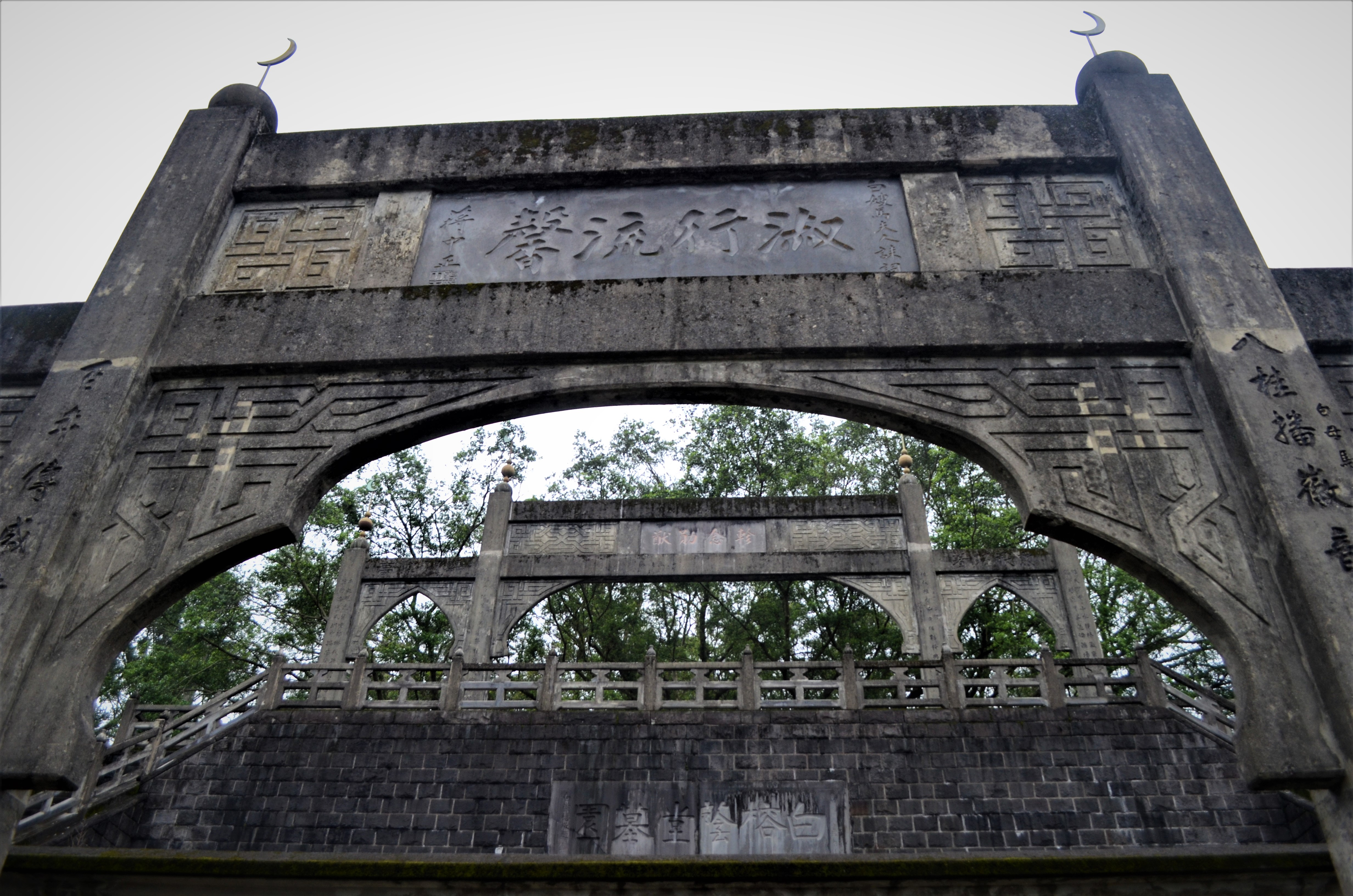
A closeup of the top of an arch of one of the entrances in the cemetery.

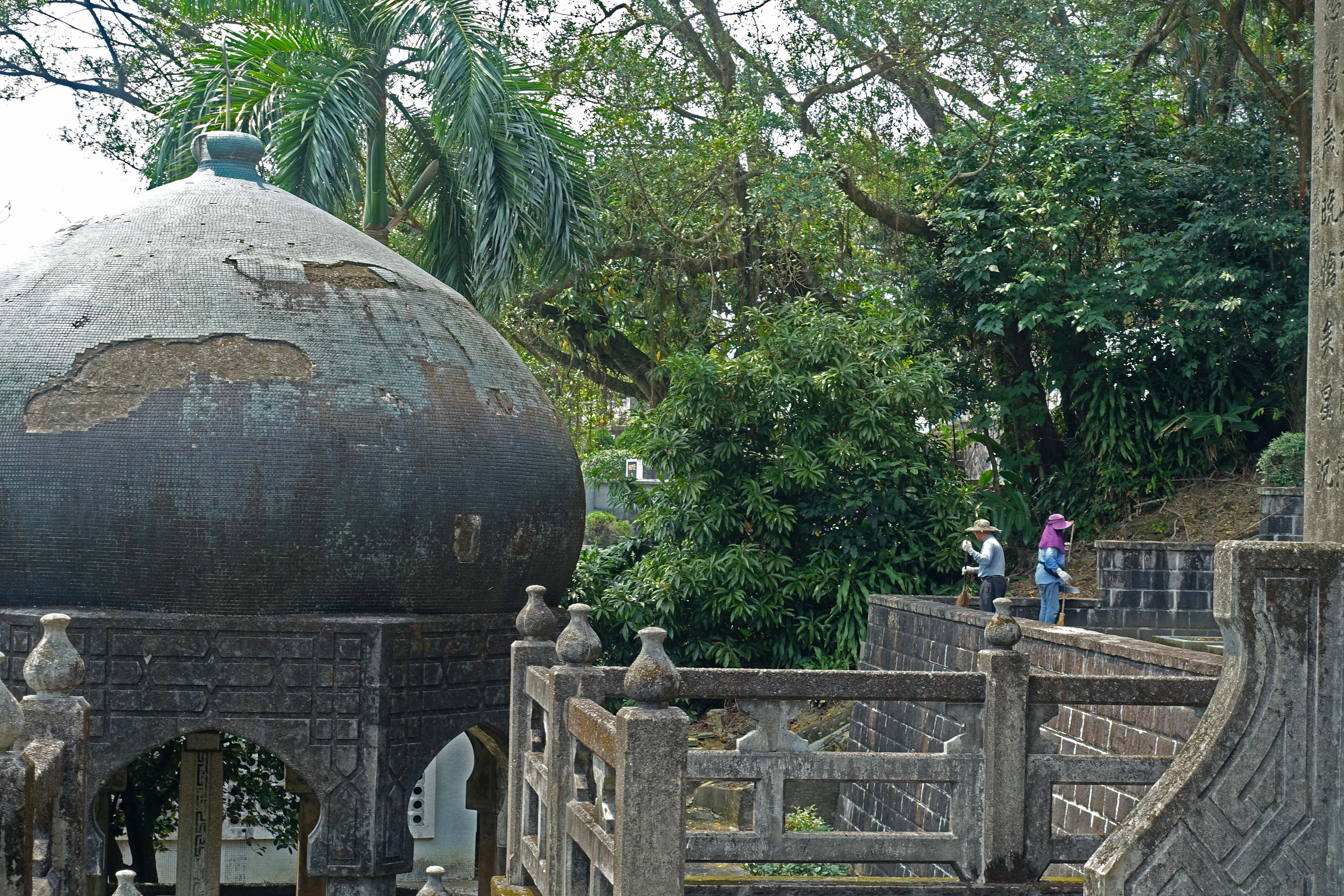
A more forested part of the cemetery, along the hullside. A domed pavilion can be seen in the foreground, while workers on a balcony can he seen towards the right.

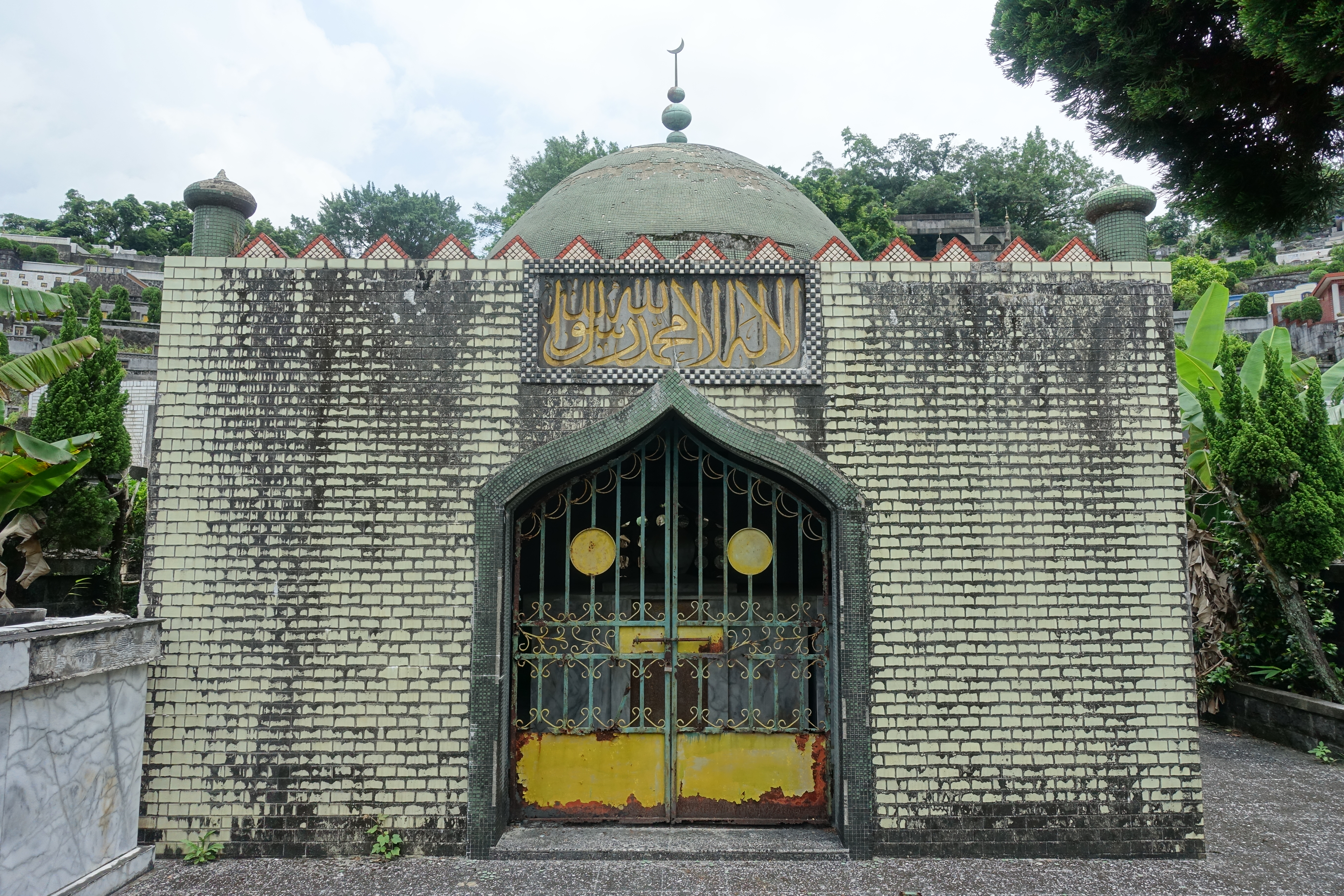
The domed tomb of Yulbars Khan in the cemetery.

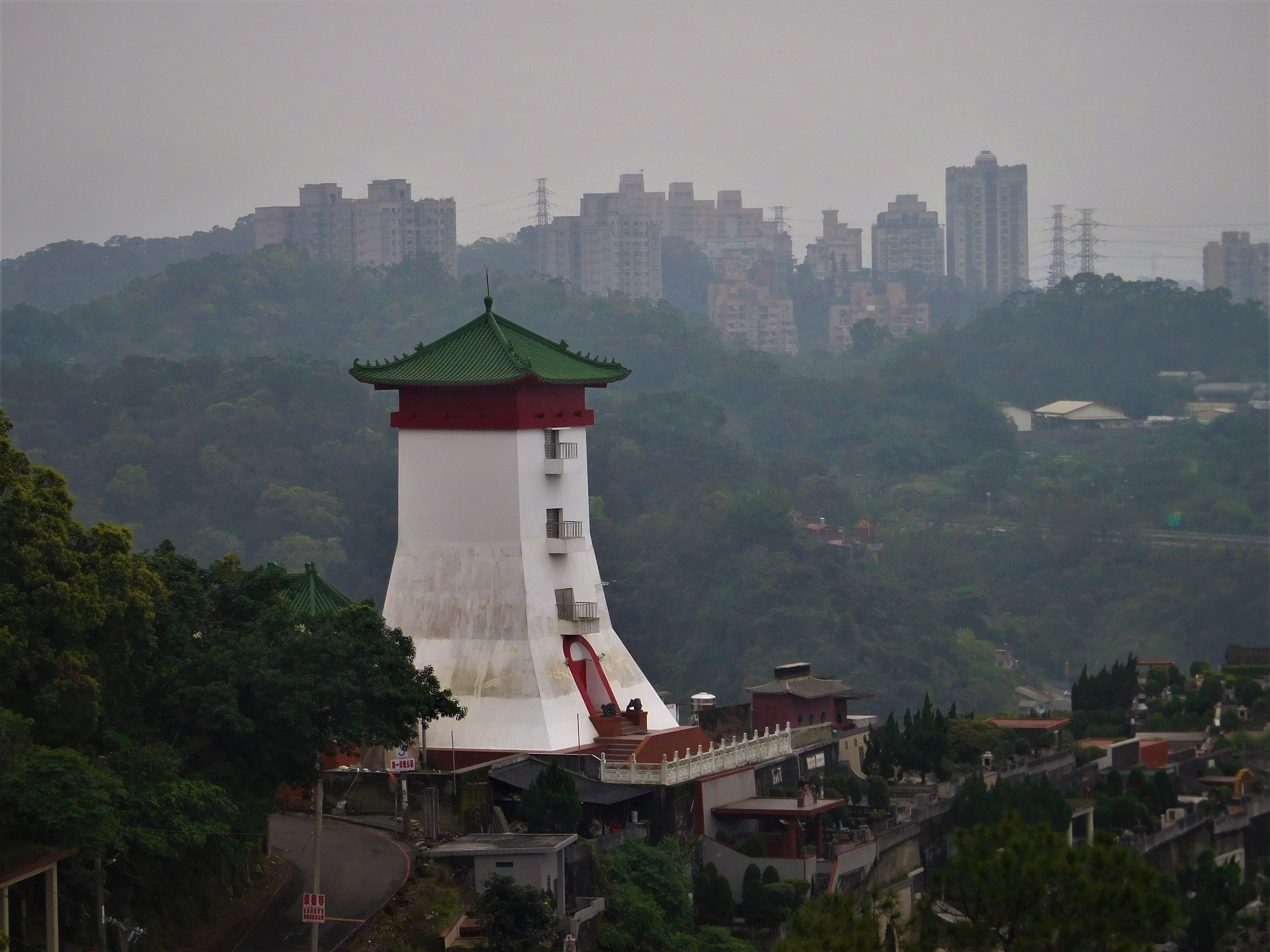
Pagoda to commemorate the deceased of the White Terror period.

== See also ==
- Islam in Taiwan
