= Chen Wen-chen =

Taiwanese mathematician alleged to have been murdered by KMT

- 陳文成
- Born: 30 January 1950; Taipei, Taiwan
- Died: 2 July 1981 (aged 31); Taipei, Taiwan
- Body discovered: 3 July 1981
- Resting place: Zhonghe (Chungho), New Taipei, Taiwan
- Education: National Taiwan University (BS); University of Michigan (MS, PhD)
- Occupation: Mathematics professor
- Spouse: Chen Su-jen (陳素貞) (m. 1976)
- Children: 1
- Scientific career
- Fields: Mathematical statistics
- Institutions: Carnegie Mellon University
- Thesis: On Zipf's Law (1978)
- Doctoral advisor: Bruce Marvin Hill

Chinese name
- Traditional Chinese: 陳文成
Transcriptions
Standard Mandarin
- Hanyu Pinyin: Chén Wénchéng
- Wade–Giles: Chʻên² Wên²-chʻêng²
- Tongyong Pinyin: Chén Wúnchéng
Southern Min
- Hokkien POJ: Tân Bûn-sêng

Chen Wen-chen (Chinese: 陳文成; pinyin: Chén Wénchéng; 30 January 1950 – 2 July 1981), sometimes romanized as Chen Wen-cheng, was a Taiwanese mathematician. He was an assistant professor of mathematics (specializing in probability and statistics) at Carnegie Mellon University who died under mysterious circumstances. After the conclusion of his third year of teaching, he returned to his native Taiwan for a vacation. He was instructed not to leave Taiwan on his scheduled departure date. Members of Taiwan's secret police, the Garrison Command, detained and interrogated him for twelve hours on 2 July 1981, and his body was found on the campus of National Taiwan University the next day. The subsequent autopsy reported his death was due to a fall. Chen's death and the earlier massacre of Lin Yi-hsiung's family are cited as late examples of White Terror dissident suppression activities in Taiwan, although the case remains unsolved and the Garrison Command maintains it had nothing to do with his death. In 2020, the Transitional Justice Commission released a report concluding that Chen was most likely killed by state security agencies.

== Personal life ==
Chen was one of eight children and was outspoken and straightforward, according to his brother. He was known to have criticized the Kuomintang (KMT)-led government in private conversations and advocated for Taiwan independence, raising funds to help those imprisoned in the wake of the Kaohsiung Incident as well as in support for Formosa Magazine, which opposed the KMT's one-party rule.

=== Academic career ===
Chen graduated with a B.S. in mathematics from National Taiwan University (NTU) in 1972 and served in the military, fulfilling his compulsory service. He left Taiwan for the United States in 1975, earning M.S. (1976) and Ph.D. (1978) degrees in statistics from the University of Michigan, with Professor Bruce Hill stating that he was "outstanding ... the best [student] that I'd seen in statistics in 21 years." Upon graduating from Michigan, he joined the faculty in the Department of Statistics of Carnegie Mellon University (CMU) in the fall of 1978. He published several papers in the area of statistics and probability.

== Detainment and death ==
After his mother visited him in 1981 and assuaged his concerns about safely traveling to Taiwan, Chen returned to Taiwan for the first time since he had left in 1975, arriving on 20 May 1981 with his wife and son. He applied for the exit permit required to return to the US upon arrival, but it had not been granted by the time he was scheduled to depart on 1 July 1981. Typically, exit permits are granted within 48 hours.

Instead, Chen was questioned by Garrison Command for two hours about his United States activities on 30 June 1981, with one question about a personal visit revealing that he had been spied upon. After the first interview, Chen was told he should receive the exit permit the next day. Chen's wife, Chen Su-jen (陳素貞; Chén Sùzhēn), received a phone call late in the afternoon of 1 July 1981 asking that Chen remain at home early the next morning to await another phone call from the Entrance and Exit Bureau. On the morning of 2 July 1981, officials from Garrison Command showed up at their door and Chen was taken for interrogation, which lasted more than 12 hours. Garrison Command state he was released to return to his brother's apartment, but his body was discovered on the campus of NTU the next morning. A family friend, Teng Wei-hsiang, has claimed that Chen visited him on the evening of 2 July 1981 after the second interview, where Chen reportedly said he was afraid of being imprisoned, but Teng was unable to remember critical details later. Reportedly, there was some money tucked into his shoe, which is said to be a trick to keep murdered souls moving to the underworld.

Chen's case was among many instances of KMT surveillance in the United States which was acted on by the Taiwan Garrison Command when the subject of the investigation returned to Taiwan.

=== Investigations ===
In the initial days following the discovery of Chen's body, Taiwan Garrison Commander-in-chief General Wang Ching-hsu speculated that Chen committed suicide, fearing arrest for his unpatriotic crimes, and claimed the interview was "cordial and friendly." Garrison Command spokesman General Hsu Mei-ling echoed the accusations of suicide, adding that they did not believe his activities did not reach a criminal level. Chen's family stated that it would have been impossible for Chen to commit suicide, as it was uncharacteristic of his nature. Chen Su-jen was immediately suspicious of several wounds which seemed atypical of a fall. Carnegie Mellon's president, Richard Cyert further stated that he had plenty of reasons to live, with a one-year-old son and a promising academic career. In late July, the Taipei district prosecutor's office allowed the possibility the death may have been an accident instead of suicide, opening the possibility of further investigation if new information or evidence became available. The Control Yuan later backed further away from suicide allegations, stating "the death was most likely accidental" in August 1981.

Garrison Command officials contend Chen confessed to seditious acts during his return to Taiwan, soliciting funds to support the anti-government Formosa Magazine and attempting to establish democratic reforms. They confronted him with photocopies of letters he had written to Shih Ming-teh while Shih was imprisoned. Wiretap records released in 2020 revealed that the Garrison Command became aware of Chen through a tapped conversation with Shih, and labeled him as a "traitor" on the basis of that conversation.

CMU President Cyert wrote a letter to Chiang Ching-kuo, who then promised a complete investigation into Chen's death. Cyert later pressed for State Department and congressional investigations once it became clear the KMT-led government had no intention of uncovering the true culprits. Chen Su-jen would later testify at a congressional hearing in October 1981.

=== Autopsies ===
Preliminary autopsy results by Taiwan authority stated Chen had suffered thirteen broken ribs, a broken pubis and three fractured vertebrae. Cyril Wecht, a forensic pathologist and a former coroner, stated the autopsy report was incomplete and offered to perform another autopsy. Wecht traveled to Taipei with Morris H. DeGroot, chair of the CMU statistics department in September 1981 to launch their own investigation. Wecht concluded, following a visual examination, and later published in The American Journal of Forensic Medicine and Pathology that Chen was murdered, "both the location of the body and the pattern of injuries are consonant with the explanation that Chen's body was held in as horizontal position over the railing of the fire escape and dropped onto the ground below." However, no action was taken by the Taiwan government.

Tina Chou (周清月; Zhōu Qīngyuè), an American reporter with the Associated Press, had her press credentials revoked by Taiwan's Government Information Office after reporting the results of Wecht's investigation. To protest the government's insufficient investigation, Chen's family refused to inter his body, and the funeral was not held until 7 January 1982.

=== "Professional students" ===
While he was a student at Michigan, Chen approached the school newspaper, The Michigan Daily, with a list of alleged secret agents of the Kuomintang government working at Michigan. Although the Daily did not run a story at the time, the issue of "professional students" with KMT sponsorship became more visible following Chen's death; a "professional student" is understood to be one who reports on pro-independence students and faculty to the Taiwan government in addition to their studies.

US Representative Jim Leach (R-IA) accused Taiwanese students of reporting Chen's activities to KMT authorities in July 1981, and Representative Stephen Solarz (D-NY) held a subcommittee hearing in July 1981 where similar accusations were made. Leach asked the U.S. Attorney General to take positive steps to combat spying, including determining whether or not the use of "professional students" violated the Foreign Agents Registration Act. One year after Chen's death, student spying activity on the CMU campus was judged to have ceased.

James Soong, then the head of the Taiwan Government Information Office, flatly denied student spying allegations. Ma Ying-jeou has been accused numerous times of being a "professional student", later filing suit over allegations made that he was a "professional student" at a memorial rally for Chen.

== Legacy ==
=== Memorials ===
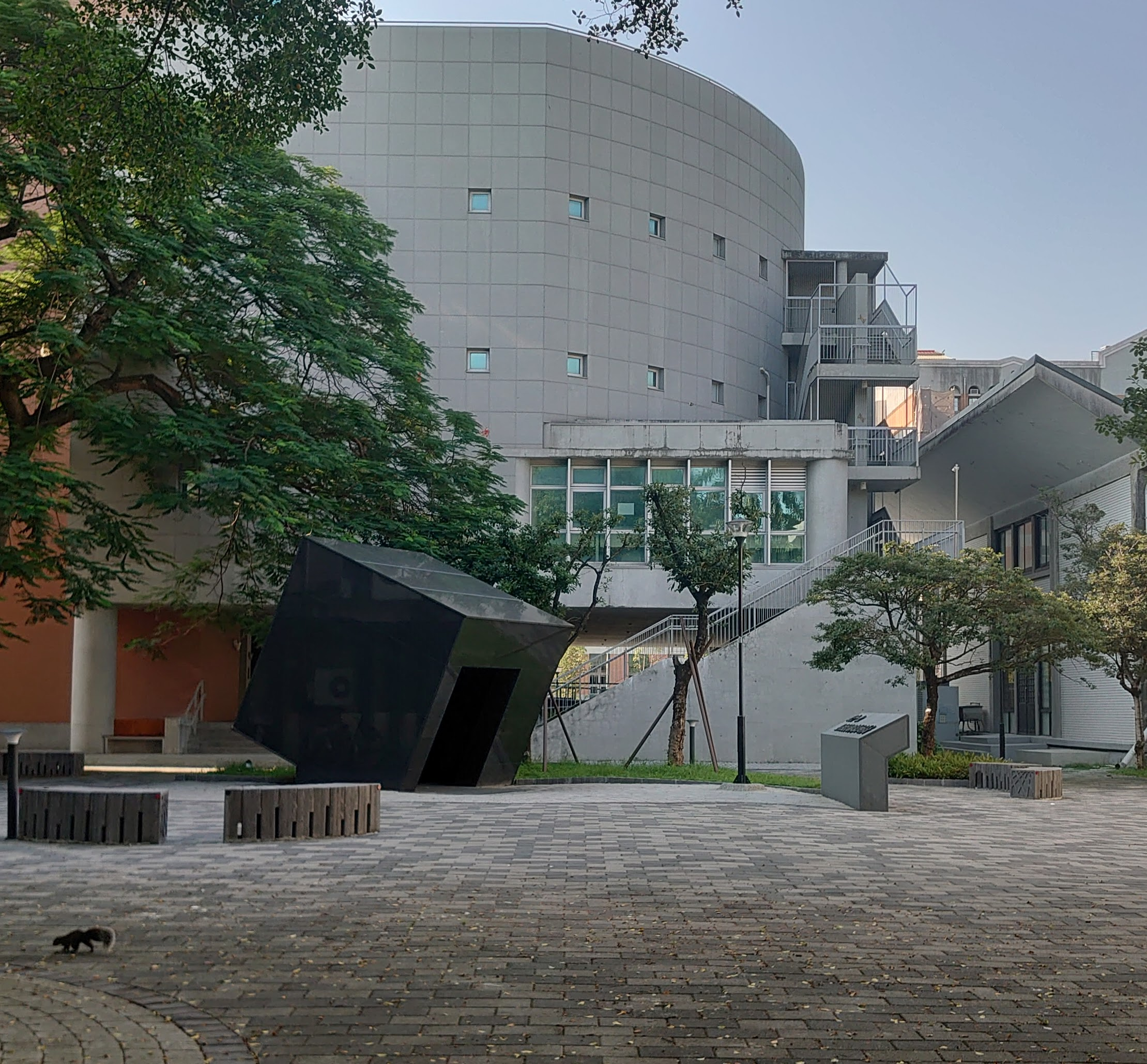
Dr. Chen Wen-chen Incident Memorial Square

Carnegie Mellon and National Taiwan University have both held memorial services on the anniversary of Chen's death. Chen's father tried to set up a scholarship in Chen's name, but was denied permission by the government.

A memorial to Chen was officially inaugurated on February 2, 2021, on the National Taiwan University campus, the culmination of an effort initiated in 2011 when the Dr. Chen Wen-chen Foundation sent a letter to the president of the university requesting the creation of the memorial. The letter never received a response, but it was brought up the next year at a student assembly meeting, where it was referred to the Gallery of NTU History. In 2014, students at NTU successfully lobbied to rename the campus square where Chen's body was found as a memorial space, and a design contest was held in 2016 to increase student and public awareness of Chen's death. As construction was to begin on the memorial in 2019, NTU president Kuan Chung-ming withdrew the university's half of the funds for the memorial, but the Foundation along with NTU student groups and mathematics department were able to raise sufficient funds ($11 million NTD) in the next three months. The university ended up agreeing to provide $1 million NTD in February 2020, and construction began in July 2020. On June 19, 2021, NTU faculty, staff, and student representatives voted and approved a proposal to include a plaque commemorating Chen at the memorial site.

The memorial at National Taiwan University is in front of the staircase where Chen's body was found.

=== Lawsuit ===
Chen's family filed suit against five officials of the Taiwan Garrison General Headquarters in 2001, seeking the truth behind the events leading up to his death. They had hoped that when Chen Shui-bian was elected, the investigation would be reopened, but were disappointed.

=== Formosa Betrayed ===
The events surrounding Chen's death as well as the murder of Henry Liu inspired the film Formosa Betrayed.

=== Later investigation ===
In 2006, the Taipei prosecutor's office stated that missing evidence and personnel were hampering any further investigations. However, the original interrogation transcript was recovered in 2009, giving fresh hope to investigators. Four weeks later, the prosecutor's office closed its investigation, stating there was insufficient evidence to charge five Garrison Command officials: Wang Ching-hsu (汪敬煦), Kuo Hsueh-chou (郭學周), Tsuo Hsiao-han (鄒小韓), Wang Wen-bin (王文繽) and Wang Yi-hua (王憶華). The investigations were criticized for not taking a fresh look at the existing evidence, questioning the motivation behind reopening the case. On 5 May 2020, the Transitional Justice Commission released a report that found that Chen was most likely killed by state security agents.
