= Green Island White Terror Memorial Park =

Memorial park in Lüdao, Taitung County, Taiwan

- 白色恐怖綠島紀念園區
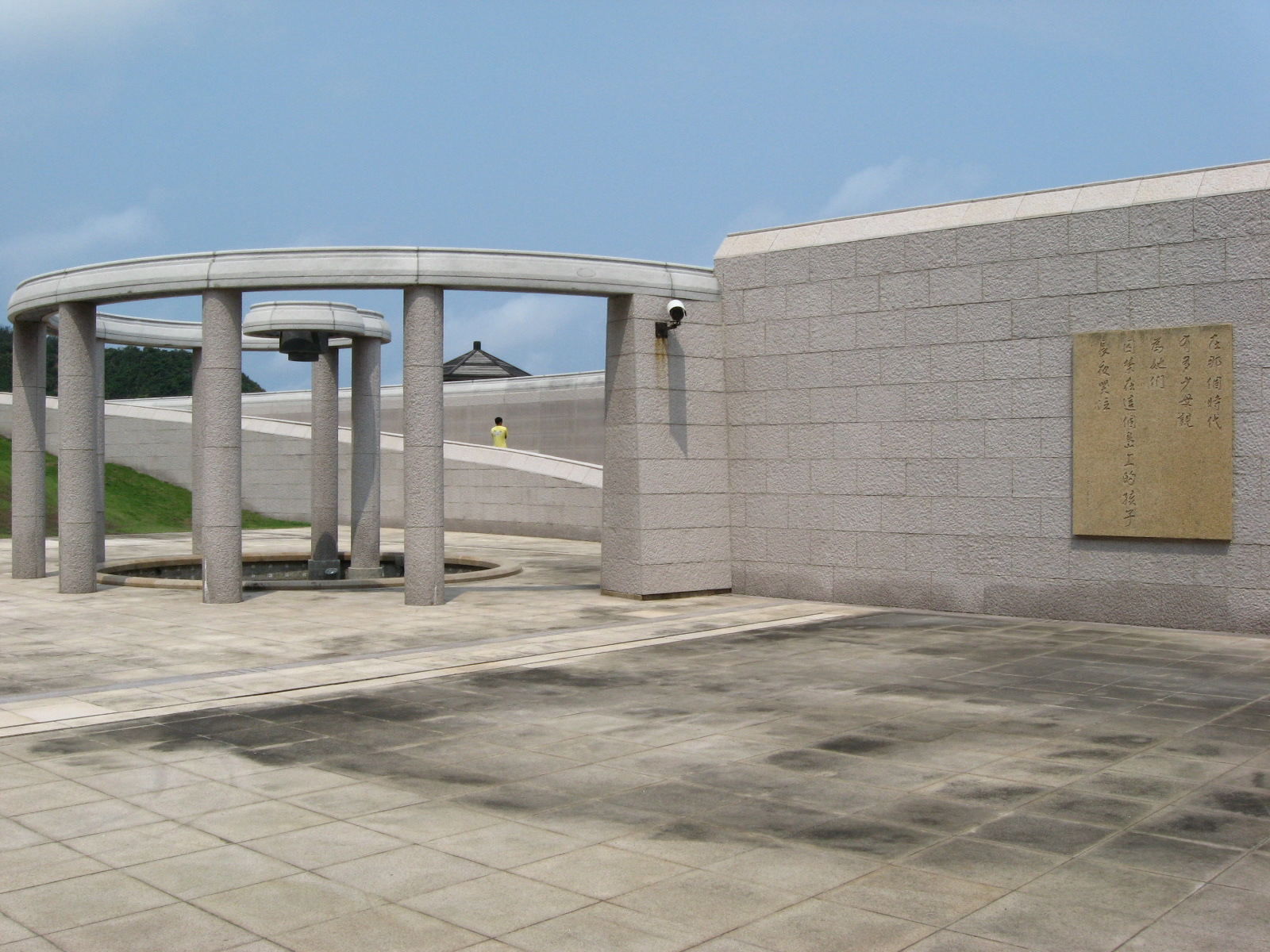
- Interactive map of the Green Island White Terror Memorial Park area

General information
- Type: museum
- Location: Green Island, Taitung County, Taiwan
- Coordinates: 22°40′30″N 121°29′46″E
- Opened: 2007

Technical details
- Size: 32 ha (79 acres)

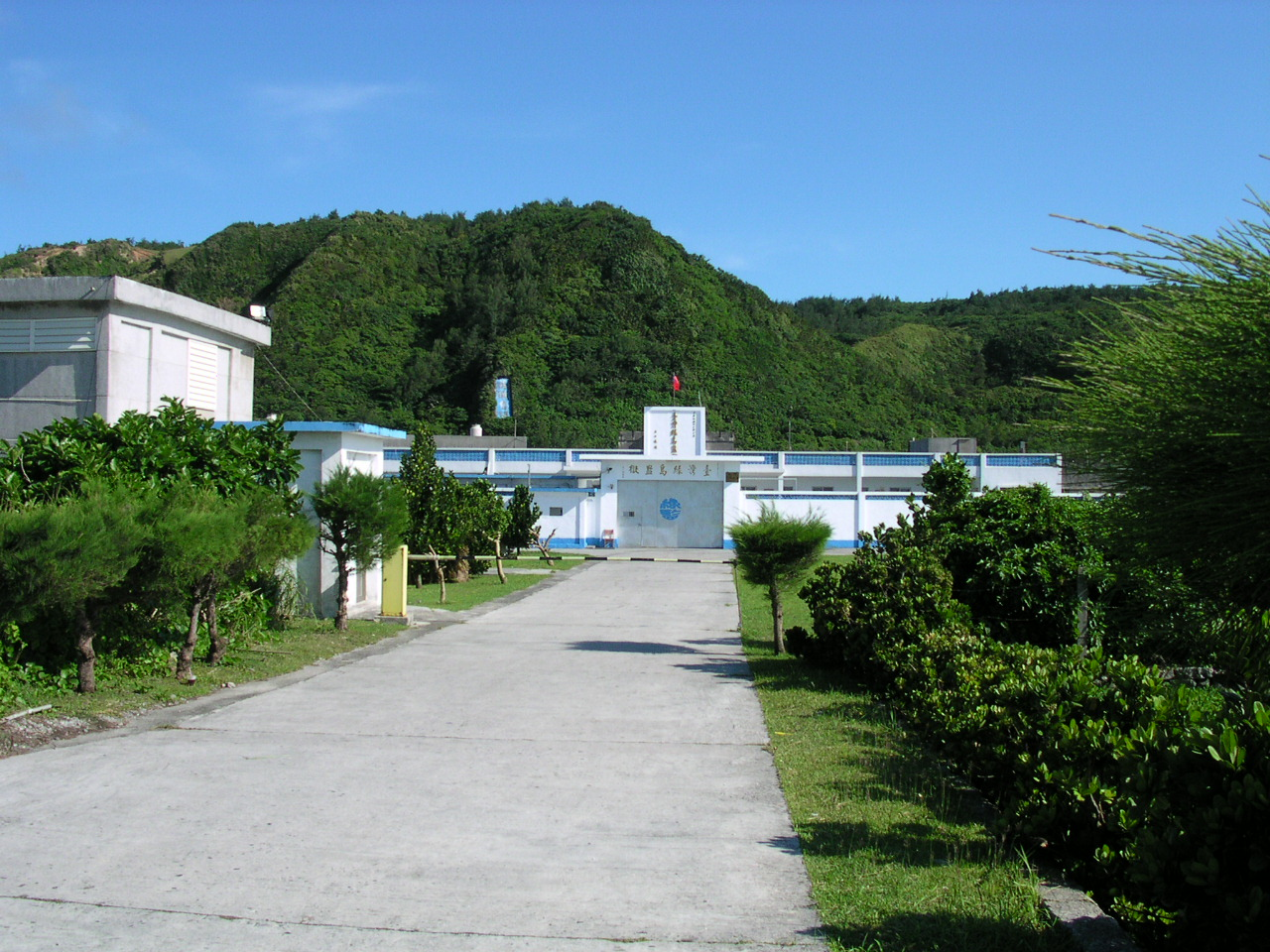
Taiwan Lyudao Prison

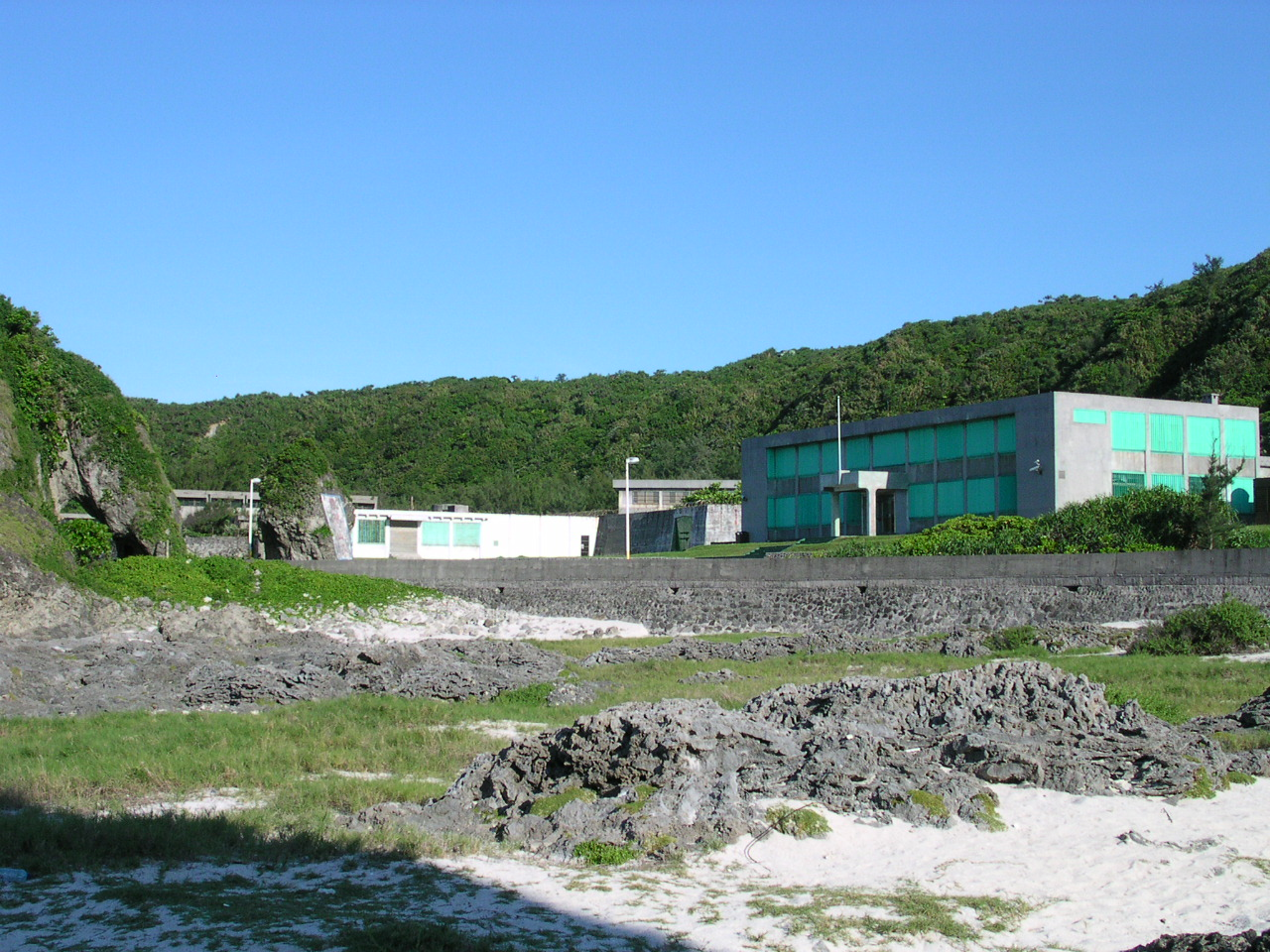
Oasis Village

The Green Island White Terror Memorial Park (traditional Chinese: 白色恐怖綠島紀念園區; simplified Chinese: 白色恐怖绿岛纪念园区; pinyin: Báisè Kǒngbù Lǜdǎo Jìniàn Yuánqū) is a memorial park in Green Island, Taitung County, Taiwan to commemorate the victims of the White Terror.

== History ==
The area used to be the shelter area during the Japanese rule. After martial law in Taiwan was declared in May 1949, many political dissidents were imprisoned on Green Island at Taiwan Lyudao Prison by the government which was built in 1951. Over time, the prisons came to symbolize political suppression. In February 1970, Taiyuan Incident took place as one of an attempt for Taiwan independence movement. Soon the Ministry of National Defense constructed the second prison. Upon its completion, the ministry transferred all of political prisoners throughout Taiwan to this new prison named the Institute of Reform and Training, which was then later renamed to Oasis Villa.

After the martial law was lifted in July 1987, the area became the Green Island Prison under the Ministry of Justice. It was then soon turned into the moral training center in 1951-1965 for the armed forces who made offences. In 1972-1987, it became a reform and training institute which was run by the Ministry of National Defense. In 2001, the Taiwan government opened the Green Island Human Rights Culture Park (Chinese: 綠島人權文化園區) to commemorate those who had fought for Taiwan's freedom, democracy and human rights.

In 2014, the park was registered as a recognized cultural landscape by the Taitung County Government. In 2018, the ownership has moved to National Human Rights Museum which establish in the same year, and changed the name of the site to its current name Green Island White Terror Memorial Park.

== Architecture ==
The 32-hectare park consists of the Human Rights Monument which was designed by Han Pao-teh, Taiwan Lyudao Prison, and the Oasis Village, which has been converted into an exhibition hall showing historical films and displays.

The Oasis Villa was a type of closed prison surrounded with high walls in a hexagonal shape with four wing cells extended from the center area. It has eight sections with a total of 52 cells. It consists of an administrative building which has an office and reception area.

== See also ==
- Jing-Mei White Terror Memorial Park
- List of museums in Taiwan
