= National Human Rights Museum =

國家人權博物館 National Human Rights Museum

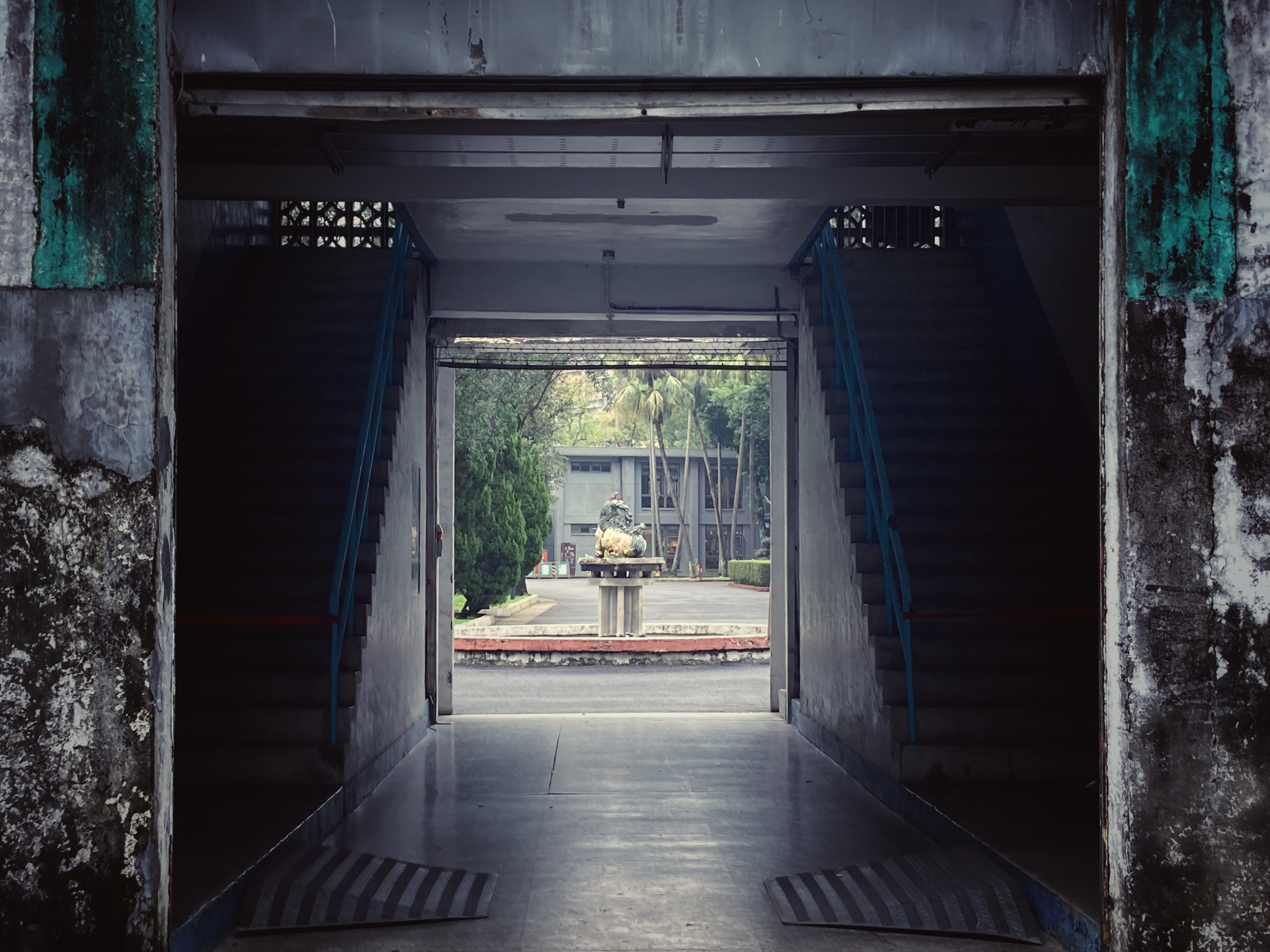
- Established: March 15, 2018
- Location: No.131, Fusing Rd. (復興路131號) Xindian Dist., New Taipei City 23150, Taiwan (Jing-Mei White Terror Memorial Park)
- Coordinates: 24.987713°N 121.532226°E
- Type: Public, Human Rights Museum
- Director: Chen Chun-hung (陳俊宏)
- Website: nhrm.gov.tw (English); nhrm.gov.tw (Mandarin Chinese)

The National Human Rights Museum is a national museum of Taiwan with locations in New Taipei City (Jing-Mei White Terror Memorial Park) and Green Island (Green Island White Terror Memorial Park). The museum was established on March 15, 2018, and opened on May 18, 2018. The museum has collections of documents, research and educational materials relating to the period of martial law in Taiwan and works with museums in Taiwan and internationally.

== See also ==
- Human rights in Taiwan
- White Terror (Taiwan)
- National Human Rights Commission (Taiwan)
- Transitional Justice Commission
