= Bai Rongyintang Cemetery =

Muslim cemetery in Taipei

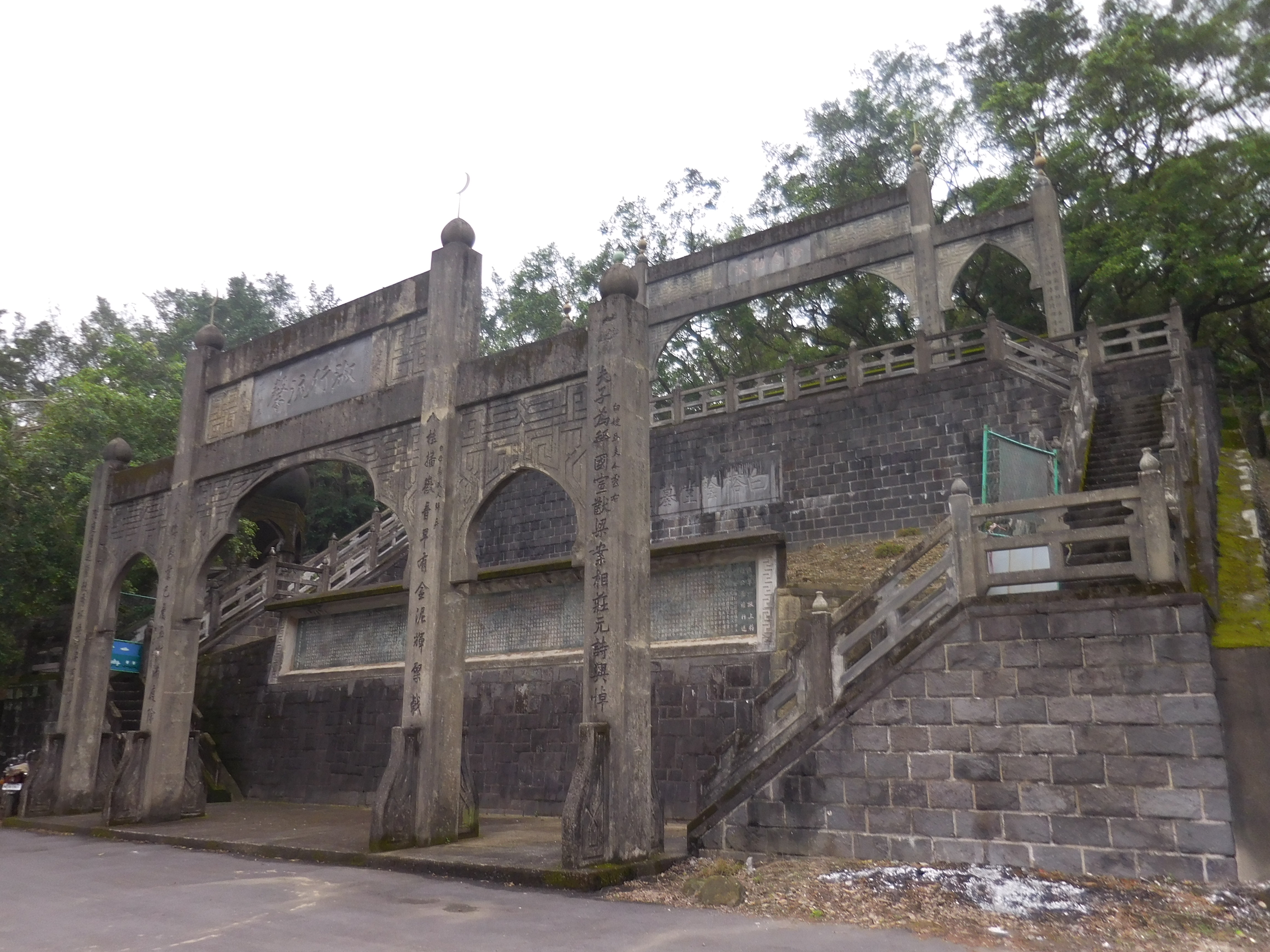
- Main entrance to the cemetery.
- Interactive map of Bai Rongyintang Cemetery
- 25.0193200°N 121.5633066°E
- Type: Cemetery
- Location: Taipei, Taiwan

History
- Built: 1963

Bai Rongyintang Cemetery (Chinese: 白榕蔭堂墓園, lit. Bái Róngyìntáng Mùyuán) is a Muslim cemetery located in the Xinyi District in Taipei, Taiwan. Part of the larger Taipei Muslim Cemetery, it is the burial place of Bai Chongxi (1893–1966), a prominent Hui Muslim general and the first Defense Minister of the Republic of China until 1949, when he had fled to Taipei.

== History ==
In 1963, Bai Chongxi, living in exile in Taipei, commissioned the establishment of the Bai Rongyintang Cemetery as a private family burial ground on a hillside in the pre-existing Taipei Muslim Cemetery. The gates, pavilions and necessary facilities in the cemetery were all designed by a son of Bai Chongxi, who was the head architect of the project. The first person to be buried in the cemetery was his wife in 1963, followed by Bai Chongxi himself after his death in 1966. Starting from the end of the 1960s, Muslim residents of Taipei began to carry out their burials in the land of the cemetery surrounding the tombs of Bai Chongxi and his family, which was opened for public usage.

In 2012, the cemetery was officially declared as a heritage site of the Muslims in Taiwan, as well as a historical monument of the country. Plans to develop the cemetery into a Muslim heritage park centred around the tomb of Bai Chongxi were also confirmed in March 2013 by politician Hau Lung-pin, who was then running as the Mayor of Taipei.

== See also ==
- Islam in Taiwan
