= Uyongʉ Yata'uyungana =

Taiwanese Tsou musician and educator

'Uongʉ'e Yata'uyungana
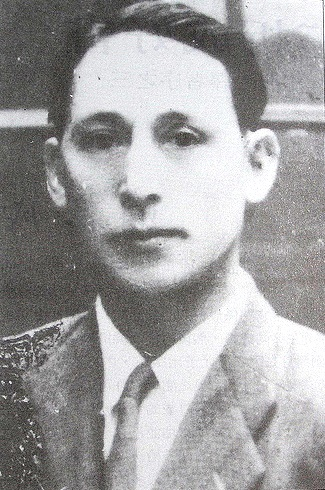
- Born: July 5, 1908; Cpu'u, Arisan, Japanese Taiwan
- Died: April 17, 1954 (aged 45); Ankang Execution Ground, Hsintien, Taipei County, Taiwan
- Occupations: Musician, educator

'Uongʉ'e Yata'uyungana (July 5, 1908 – April 17, 1954), also known as Yata Issei (矢多一生/矢田一生), Kazuo (一夫) or Kao Yi-sheng (高一生), was a Taiwanese Tsou musician and educator of the Tfuya tribe. He served as a local officer and a leader of the indigenous autonomous movement in the early post-war Taiwan.

Yatauyungana was educated at Tainan Normal School and became a teacher. In 1945, he served as mayor of Wufeng Township in Chiayi, which was later named Alishan.

During the 228 Incident in 1947, Yatauyungana led a group of Tsou to fight the Kuomintang in Chiayi; when their attempts to take Chiayi Airport were unsuccessful, they returned to Alishan. He was later arrested but was released thanks to lobbying on the part of Losing Watan, an Atayal leader.

In 1952, during the White Terror, he was accused of treason by the government for his advocacy for indigenous autonomy, and was executed along with five other indigenous leaders, including Watan. He was posthumously exonerated by the Transitional Justice Commission on July 29, 2020.

== Family ==
- Yukawa Haruko (湯川春子) or Kao Chun-feng (高春風) (wife)
- Kikuko Yata'uyungana or Kao Chu-hua (高菊花), stage name Panana (派娜娜), famous Mandopop singer (daughter)
- Avai Yata'uyungana (son)
- Tanivu Yata'uyungana (granddaughter)
- Yinguyu Yata'uyungana (granddaughter)
- Voyʉe Toskʉ (maternal half-brother)

== Commemoration ==
On Peace Memorial Day in 2023, Taiwanese heavy metal band Chthonic released a new song titled "PATTONKAN(護國山)" in memory of Yatauyungana and his daughter. The lyrics of the song reflect the letters he wrote to his wife before his execution.
