= Nantou shooting =

1959 mass murder in Nantou City, Taiwan

- Native name: 南投滅門大慘案
- Location: Nantou City, Taiwan
- Date: 20 September 1959 c. 2 a.m. (CST)
- Target: Lu and Wu families
- Attack type: Mass murder, murder-suicide
- Weapon: Two carbines
- Deaths: 11 (including the perpetrator)
- Injuries: 4
- Perpetrator: Li Hsing-ju
- Motive: Jealousy and anger over failed relationships

On 20 September 1959, a mass shooting took place in Nantou City, Taiwan. Ten people, including five members of the Lu family and four members of the Wu family, were killed before the perpetrator, 29-year-old Li Hsing-ju, killed himself upon being surrounded by police.

== Background ==
In 1958, Li Hsing-ju, a Republic of China Army first lieutenant (inaccurately described as a captain in some English reports) and Central Military Academy graduate originally from Tiexi District, Shenyang, entered a secret romantic relationship with high schooler Lu Mu-sheng, who was a member of a locally prominent waishengren family from Linsen County in Fuzhou. Her father, Lu Mao-chu, was the Dean of Students at Nantou Middle School.

In late August 1958, with the beginning of the Second Taiwan Strait Crisis, Li was stationed to the Kinmen Islands, where he remained for the next months to serve as a company commander and artillery operator. During this time, Lu, at the wish of her parents, became engaged to Yu Chuang-jin (sometimes misreported as Yu Chuang Sheng), a neighbour and fellow former resident of Linsen County who owned a farm in Guoxing Township. Upon his return to Nantou in 1959, Li demanded Lu break off the engagement, which she refused to do, though Li and Lu still continued their affair. Lu reportedly did not want to marry at all for the time being to instead attend Fu Hsing Kang College.

With Lu's upcoming wedding to Yu on 21 September, Lu introduced Li to Wu Su-chu, a former classmate from her secondary school belonging to a well-regarded benshengren family. Wu's parents rejected Li because he did not share a provincial origin. Like Lu, Wu also intended to focus on her education, having turned down a previous wedding proposal from a wealthy overseas Chinese suitor in Japan, and as a result, she repeatedly dissuaded Li from marriage and made it clear she was not interested in a relationship with him, though both reportedly maintained a close friendship still. All three were seen at a local Mid-Autumn Festival event on seemingly platonic terms a few days before the shooting. However, on 19 September, Li was reportedly spotted stalking Li and Yu as they were shopping for wedding supplies.

== Shooting ==
=== Lu family home ===
On 20 September, at approximately 2 a.m., Li Hsing-ju, armed with two carbines, broke into the on-campus faculty housing section of Nantou Middle School on 105 Minquan Street, where five teachers and their families resided, though at the time, a few additional staff members shared the dormitories. Inside the Lu residence, all five members of the household, consisting of Lu Mu-sheng, her father Lu Mao-qu, and her three younger siblings, 14-year-old brother Lu Yuan-sheng, 10-year-old sister Lu Mei-mei, and 7-year-old brother Lu Tai-sheng, were asleep, along with Lu Mu-sheng's fiancé Yu Chuan-jin who was staying overnight after a visit. Li snuck into the quarters and first dragged Lu Mu-sheng out of the building into a nearby greenspace in the courtyard, where he shot and beat her. Li then went back inside and opened fire inside the bedroom, killing Lu Mao-qu, Yu Chuan-jin, Lu Yuan-sheng, and Lu Me-mei on the spot. Lu Tai-sheng initially survived but died of his wounds in the noon hours of the following day.

Just after the shooting, several staff members rushed to the Lu residence to investigate the noise. Lu Mu-sheng was found by Dean of Discipline Chen Wen-hsun, who kept her conscious by talking with her until another staff member arrived. The first person to arrive at the Lu residence, teacher Ma Shou-shan, a veteran of the Chinese Civil War from Shuyang, stepped into the doorway and asked who was inside while shining a flashlight into the bedroom. Li fatally shot Ma and walked out of the residence, shortly after being confronted by history teacher Chen Chou Fu-ping, the wife of Chen Wen-hsun. Having witnessed the killing of Ma, Chou tried to reason with Li asking him to put down the weapons and talk it out to "not frighten the children" (別嚇著孩子). Li reportedly responded "None, none left" (沒有，沒有了) and when asked to clarify, he shouted that there were "None, no more children" (沒有，沒有孩子了) before shooting Chou in the stomach. Li fled the campus as Chou's husband reached the scene, checking on the Lu bedroom at her suggestion to find everyone shot.

=== Wu family home ===
Li ran towards the home of the Wu family on 57 Minquan Street, around 50 metres (160 ft) away from the faculty housing, discarding one of his guns along the way. Entering the ground floor family shop, Yen-tang Appliance Store, Li ambushed all six family members as they had gathered after being awoken by the gunshots, killing father Wu Yen-tang, mother Chang Tzu-feng, and the younger two of their four children, 17-year-old daughter Wu Su-lan and 14-year-old son Wu Peng-chih. The two older daughters, Li's friend Wu Su-chu and her elder sister Wu Su-ying, survived with critical and light injuries respectively.

Police arrived at the scene shortly after the second shooting, ordering Li to surrender under threat of tear gas usage. Li subsequently killed himself by shooting himself in the head.

== Victims ==
=== Killed ===
- Lu Mao-qu (盧懋渠), 50
- Lu Yuan-sheng (盧元生), 14
- Lu Mei-mei (盧媄媄), 10
- Lu Tai-sheng (盧台生), 7
- Yu Chuan-jin (余傳金), 30
- Ma Shou-shan (馬壽山), 35
- Wu Yen-tang (吳宴堂), 44
- Wu Chang Tzu-feng (吳張資鳳), 39
- Wu Su-lan (吳素蘭), 17
- Wu Peng-chih (吳鵬志), 14

=== Injured ===
- Lu Mu-sheng (盧木生), 20
- Chen Chou Fu-ping (陳周輔平)
- Wu Su-chu (吳素珠), 19
- Wu Su-ying (吳素英), 23

== Aftermath ==
Autopsies on nine of the victims were conducted on the morning 21 September by Chai Chi-chen of Taichung District Prosecutor's Office. The bodies were set for funeral services the same day.

Lu Mu-sheng was treated for a perforated lung at Army No. 62 Hospital. Chou Fu-ping was initially also treated at the same hospital, but due to their lack of equipment, her husband called Chiang Ching-kuo, son of President Chiang Kai-shek and chief of Taiwan Garrison Command, who reportedly owed Chen a favor after Chen and Chou, who had come from Lantian after the civil war, were imprisoned at No. 3, Qingdao East Road detention center by Taiwan Garrison Command during the early stages of the White Terror, leading to the birth of their daughter within the prison site. Chen requested for his wife to receive adequate treatment, which Chiang obliged by having the military transport Chou to Tri-Service General Hospital in Taipei, where she recovered after six months. Chou's daughter corrected erroneous reports that her mother had died in the shooting in 2012, saying she was still alive over sixty years later, outliving her husband who died in the late 1990s.

As a sign of goodwill, the Kuomintang government sent a condolence fund of NT$50,000 through a special representative to the victims' families. Lu personally received $16,000, which resulted in a conflict with her brother Lu Songsheng, a student at the Fengshan Army Military Academy, who blamed his sister's relationship with Li for the deaths of their family. Due to martial law in Taiwan, the KMT government restricted reports once the shooting became national knowledge through print media in order to avoid another source for negative perception of the military as well as potential clashes between waishenren and benshengren over the apparent inciting relationship issues involving both groups.
