= Chao Tien-yi =

Taiwanese poet and critic

Chao Tien-yi (Chinese: 趙天儀; September 10, 1935 – April 29, 2020), a native of Taichung city, was a Taiwanese poet, critic, and professor, using the pen name Liu Wen-che (柳文哲). He held positions such as professor and acting department chair at the Philosophy Department of National Taiwan University. Chao actively participated in literary societies like the Li Poetry Society, serving as the chief editor for publications such as Li Poetry (笠), Taiwan Literary Arts (臺灣文藝), Taiwan Veracity (臺灣春秋), and Man-tien-hsing (滿天星). He received numerous awards, including the Oxford Award for Taiwan Writers (臺灣文學家牛津獎).

== Biography ==
During his secondary and high school years, Chao Tien-yi began reading poetry, classical Chinese novels, martial arts fiction, and contemporary Chinese literature. He wrote poetry extensively, studied the works of predecessors from the Japanese-ruled era and the early post-war period, and frequently engaged in literary discussions with friends like Pai Chiu (白萩). In 1962, Chao published his first poetry collection, A Visit to the Orchard (果園的造訪), which featured works from his high school, university, and graduate school years.

== Activities ==
In 1964, Chao Tien-yi co-founded the Li Poetry Society and participated in the editing of the Li Poetry. He also planned and edited anthologies like the Formosa Poetry Collection (美麗島詩集). Chao was a prolific poetry critic and authored several collections of critical essays, including Aesthetics and Criticism (美學與批評), The Naked King (裸體的國王), Poetic and Aesthetic Sense (詩意的與美感的), and Modern Aesthetics (現代美學).

In 1974, the NTU Department of Philosophy Incident erupted, resulting in the dismissal of 12 full-time and part-time faculty members, including Chao Tien-yi. Subsequently, at the recommendation of his mentor Chi Pang-yuan (齊邦媛), he joined the National Institute for Compilation and Translation and authored the book The Truth Behind the NTU Department of Philosophy Incident (台大哲學系事件真相) in 1979.

Chao Tien-yi served as the Chairman of the Taiwan Provincial Children's Literature Association, actively promoting the creation and exchange of children's literature in the country. Additionally, he wrote an article titled "The Development of the Taiwan Poetry Scene in the Past Twenty Years" (二十年來的臺灣詩壇), providing an overview of the post-war two decades of development in the Taiwanese poetry scene.
