= The American Journal of Forensic Medicine and Pathology =

- Discipline: Forensic Medicine, Forensic Pathology
- Language: English
- Edited by: Dr. Kimberley Molina

Publication details
- History: 1980–present
- Publisher: Lippincott Williams & Wilkins
- Frequency: Quarterly
- Impact factor: 1.108 (2021)

Standard abbreviations
- ISO 4: Am. J. Forensic Med. Pathol.

Indexing
- ISSN: 0195-7910 (print); 1533-404X (web)

Links
- Journal homepage

The American Journal of Forensic Medicine and Pathology is a peer-reviewed scientific journal published by Lippincott Williams & Wilkins (formerly Raven Press) covering research on forensic medicine and forensic pathology. The current editor-in-chief is D. Kimberley Molina.

== Abstracting and indexing ==
The journal is abstracted and indexed in:

- PubMed

According to the Journal Citation Reports, the journal has an impact factor of 0.624.
