= Huang Rong-can =

Chinese artist and printmaker (1920–1952)

- 黃榮燦
- Born: 17 October 1920; Chongqing, Sichuan, Republic of China
- Died: November 19, 1952 (aged 32); Taipei, Taiwan
- Education: South West Vocational School of Art
- Notable work: The Horrifying Inspection（1947)

Huang Rong-can (Chinese: 黃榮燦; pinyin: Huáng Róngcàn; Wade–Giles: Huang Jung-tsan) (October 17, 1920 – November 11/19, 1952) was a Chinese artist and printmaker. Born in Chongqing, he worked as a teacher and trained in art before moving to Taiwan in 1945. There, he continued teaching, and attracted attention for his modernist and politically radical woodcuts, particularly The Horrifying Inspection (恐怖的檢查), an iconic depiction of the 228 Incident. His work's leftist subject matter drew the ire of the Nationalist Government, and he was executed in Taipei in 1952.

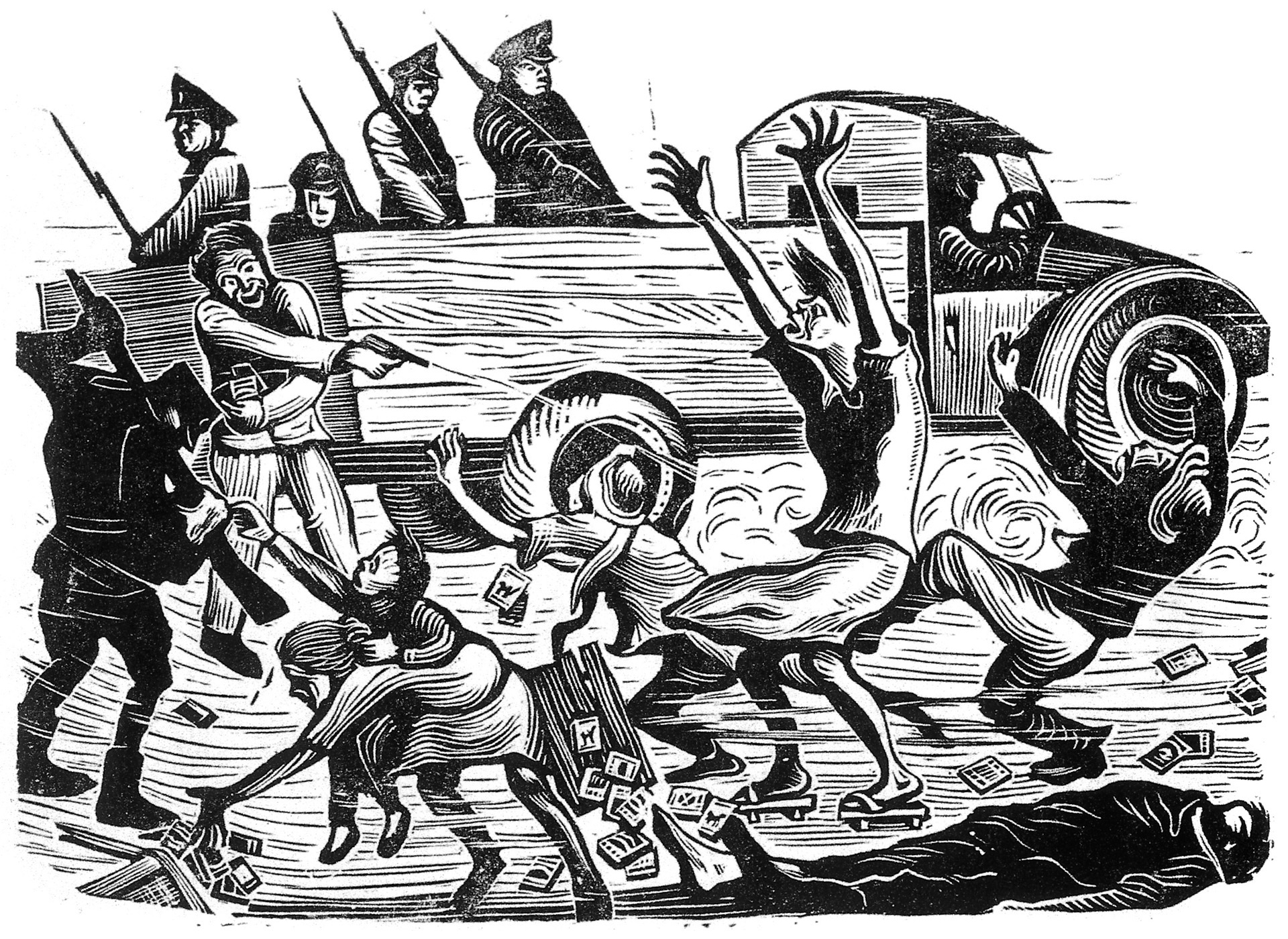
The Horrifying Inspection, 1947

== Early life ==
Huang Rong-can was born in Chongqing in Sichuan Province, China. He studied in the South West Vocational School of Art during the Second Sino-Japanese War. In 1938, he studied at the Kunming National College of Arts, where he was inspired by the Lu Xun woodcut movement and revolutionary ideas.

== Work in mainland China ==
Huang taught art at a junior high school in Guangxi, simultaneously organizing a group to study the woodcut technique. He emerged as a prominent figure in the Chinese Left-Wing Woodcut Movement, which was championed by Lu Xun. Huang served as editor and co-editor of woodcut literature publications. In 1943, he curated an exhibition in Liuzhou, Guangxi, showcasing drawings from the battlefronts.

He was profoundly influenced by Lu Xun, who, in the spirit of social realism, adapted Russian and German printmaking techniques to suit the circumstances in China. Lu Xun viewed woodcut art as a powerful tool for propaganda and mass education in the war against Japan. He considered woodcuts to be “people’s art”, capable of expressing raw emotion through strong black and white lines, thus facilitating social change. This approach to portraying suffering was revolutionary in Chinese art, which had previously adhered to Confucian and Daoist ideals of harmony in its depictions.

During the Chinese Left-wing Woodcut Movement, he produced numerous realistic woodcuts depicting the lives of people and the landscapes of the southwestern province of China. In 1945, he relocated to Shanghai to work at a newspaper, where his works gained widespread recognition. Additionally, he was recruited in 1945 for a teaching position in Taiwan through the Ministry of Education examination process conducted by the Nationalist government under Chiang Kai-Shek from the 1920s to 1949. He arrived in Taiwan at the end of 1945, at the age of 25, but his time there was tragically short-lived. He spent only seven years in Taiwan before he was executed.

== Role in Taiwan's modern art movement ==
In Taiwan, Huang Rong-can was prolific in print exhibitions. Huang's spiritual guide undoubtedly was Lu Xun. Following Lu Xun in taking inspiration from early twentieth century German expressionist prints, including those by Käthe Kollwitz, Huang captured the local life of the Taiwanese people in his work.

Huang Rong-can was the owner of a bookshop outside of a university in Taipei, and taught younger artists. In 1946, he became an art editor for the newspaper, Ren Min Dao Bao (People's Tribune) and was head of the cultural supplement, Nan Hong. He formed a publishing house, and published books, journals and monthly periodicals. His writing in these various publications led him to become an active figure in introducing Western art history and his research to the Taiwanese art scene. He met some important Taiwanese writers and artists, included Wang Bai Yuan, Lee Shih-chiao, and Yang San-lang. Together, they exchanged and developed their thoughts and ideas.

Huang Rong-can was a professor of the Fine Arts Department at the National Taiwan Normal University, which was at the time called the Teacher's Institute

=== Fine Arts Study Group ===
The modern art movement in Taiwan during the White Terror period was intervened at various moments by the state apparatus of the Nationalist KMT government. In the 1950s, mainland artists through state authority positions came to dominate the art scene. Art exhibitions sponsored by government agencies were anti-communist and anti-Russian in nature. The exhibitions were made up of artists from the "New Art movement," which was named after the New Art magazine that promoted the new "Free China" art movement. It was the Chinese Association of Arts and Culture that promoted the "battle arts and culture" policy. In 1951, this association was organised into the Chinese Fine Arts Association by Hu Ko-wei, the deputy director of the General Political Warfare Department under the Department of Defense. Hu Ko-wei enlisted a mainland-born artist named Liu Shih to begin the Fine Arts Study Group under this committee.

Huang Rong-can was hired by Liu Shih to be the academic director of the Fine Arts Study Group. He ran the art class together with Liu Shih in 1950 on Hankou Street in Taipei, called the “Fine Art Study Group”. Here they taught drawing and hired other artists as instructors. In this group there were such artists as Lee Chun-Shan (Li Chung-sheng), one of the influential pioneers of the modern art movement, as well as Wu Hao, Chu Te-chun and Hsia Yang. In his role in the Fine Arts Study Group, Huang introduced new colleagues with innovative ideas to the modern art scene in Taiwan, including artists that had studied in Japan. Huang and instructors from the Fine Arts Study group made up a large part of the exhibition artists who participated in Taiwan's first modern painting exhibition, the Modern Painting Group Exhibition at Chungshan Hall in Taipei, held in 1951. Official dismissal ended the Fine Arts Study Group.

=== The Horrifying Inspection ===
In 1947, the 228 Incident occurred. Huang Rong-can did not see the scene that he depicted in The Horrifying Inspection firsthand, but had heard about it from a friend. In search for justice, he began collecting data from witnesses of the 228 Incident. Two months later, he completed the secret The Horrifying Inspection woodcut, based on oral accounts of what happened in the first occurrence that triggered the 228 Incident. The print is a rare visual representation of the 228 Incident from that time. It is a depiction of the widow who was selling cigarettes being seized by authorities, amidst an ensuing scuffle that shows a person getting shot by a bureaucrat.

On April 13, 1947, Huang personally brought The Horrifying Inspection with him on a boat to Shanghai. He published it under a pen name in the newspaper Wen Hui Bao, on April 28, 1947. In Shanghai that November it was displayed in a national woodcut exhibition. From there, Huang donated the print to a Japanese friend, from where it found its way to its present destination in the collection of the Kanagawa Museum of Modern Art in Japan.

The print was also recirculated through its reprint in the magazine Xia Chao. Its image spread widely all across Taiwan, and has become an iconic image of the 228 Incident.

After the 228 event, Huang remained in Taiwan, and taught art in colleges. He also continued to make woodcuts; however, he transferred his subject matter to the aboriginal people in Taitung or Lanyu island. He also travelled to Orchid Island to collect creative material for his work.

== Arrest and execution ==
Huang was arrested from the staffroom of the Teacher's College on December 1, 1951. He was put in jail under the accusation of engaging in propaganda, treason, and spying for the Chinese Communists. The Nationalist Government accused one of his prints of Orchid Island to be part of Communist Party research to plan the landing of their troops. The Department of Defense Military Bureau sentenced him to death, and he was executed in November 1952 at the age of 32.

In Hong Sung-dam's recount of his death, Huang and his girlfriend were arrested as part of the KMT military's suppression of resistance to their regime. They were taken to a prison in Taipei, and days later they were separately executed by gun shot at a cattle market beside a river.

The Ministry of Defense took photos of Huang before his execution, which they sent to the President Chiang Kai-shek after Huang had been killed.

According to Mei Dean-E, the official document of his burying permit is recorded as November 19, 1952. However, on his tombstone is written November 14, 1952.

Huang's death left a psychological toll on his colleagues in the modernist art movement. Fellow founder of the studio in Hankow Street, Lee Chun Shan began to discourage his students from further organisation of art associations or movements due to such political oppression, and soon after left Taipei. Many senior artists and educators exiled themselves overseas, resulting in the end of the New Art movement. Other leftist woodcut painters also migrated. Those who stayed were restricted in their work to anti-communist imagery and apolitical depictions of country life.

== Remembrance and legacy ==
Most of Huang Rong-can's prints and speeches have been lost.

The location of Huang's grave was lost and only accidentally discovered forty years later in a mass grave. A former prisoner of the White Terror period was searching for the body of his brother, another victim of the White Terror, by reportedly following directions from a dream. In 1993 they found six mass graves, one of which Huang Rong-can was buried.

Huang is buried on a deserted hill in the Taipei Municipal Cemetery, Liuzhangli, with 206 other graves of people killed in the beginning of the White Terror. A memorial was established on this site in 2003. In 2014 Taiwanese families of the victims made complaints towards the government about their neglect to care and maintain for the memorial, and that it was in need of restoration.

Artist who have made exhibitions and publications inspired by Huang's life and work are Mei Dean E (1997 and 2003). and Hung Song-dam (2013). There have been several exhibitions in the last five years dedicated to Huang, including an exhibition in the National Museum of Taiwanese Literature in 2013.

He is thought of as the first artist in Taiwan to belong to the Chinese left-wing print movement. Although there were other members of the movement who had been to Taiwan and created realistic woodcuts depicting the everyday life, like Zhu Ming Gang, Huang's artworks went beyond this style of realism. His work was able to express his deep concern for common people's lives and hardships.

Huang's work can be found in the collections of the National Gallery Australia, British Museum, Kanagawa Museum of Modern Art, Taiwan Museum of Fine Arts and the American Museum of Colgate University in Hamilton.

== See also ==
- Taiwanese art
