= Jing-Mei White Terror Memorial Park =

Museum in Xindian, New Taipei, Taiwan

- 白色恐怖景美紀念園區
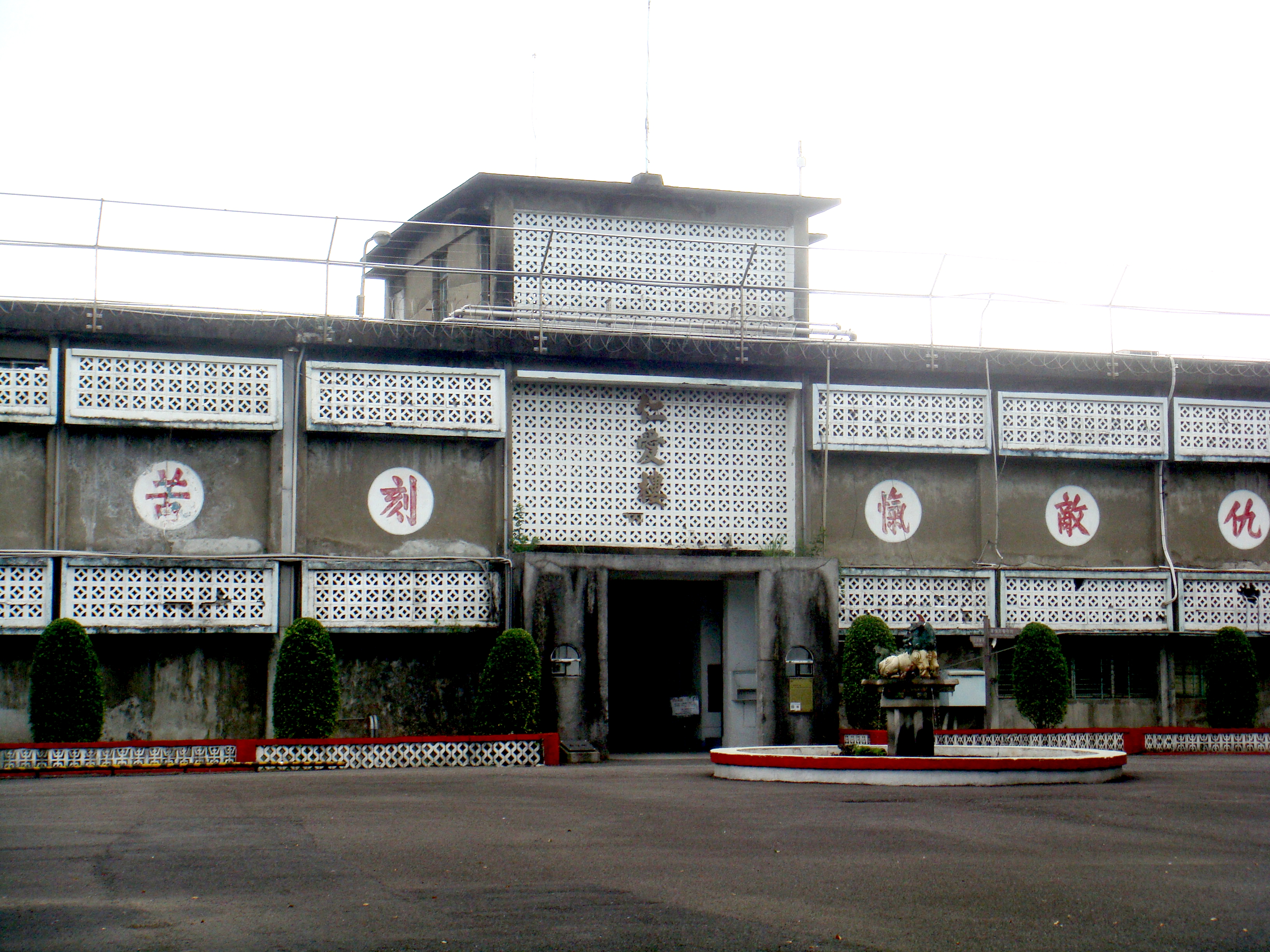
- Interactive map of the Jing-Mei White Terror Memorial Park area
- Former names: Jingmei Military Detention Center; Jing-Mei Human Rights Memorial and Cultural Park

General information
- Type: Museum
- Location: Xindian, New Taipei City, Taiwan
- Coordinates: 24°59′17.9″N 121°31′55.8″E
- Opened: 2007

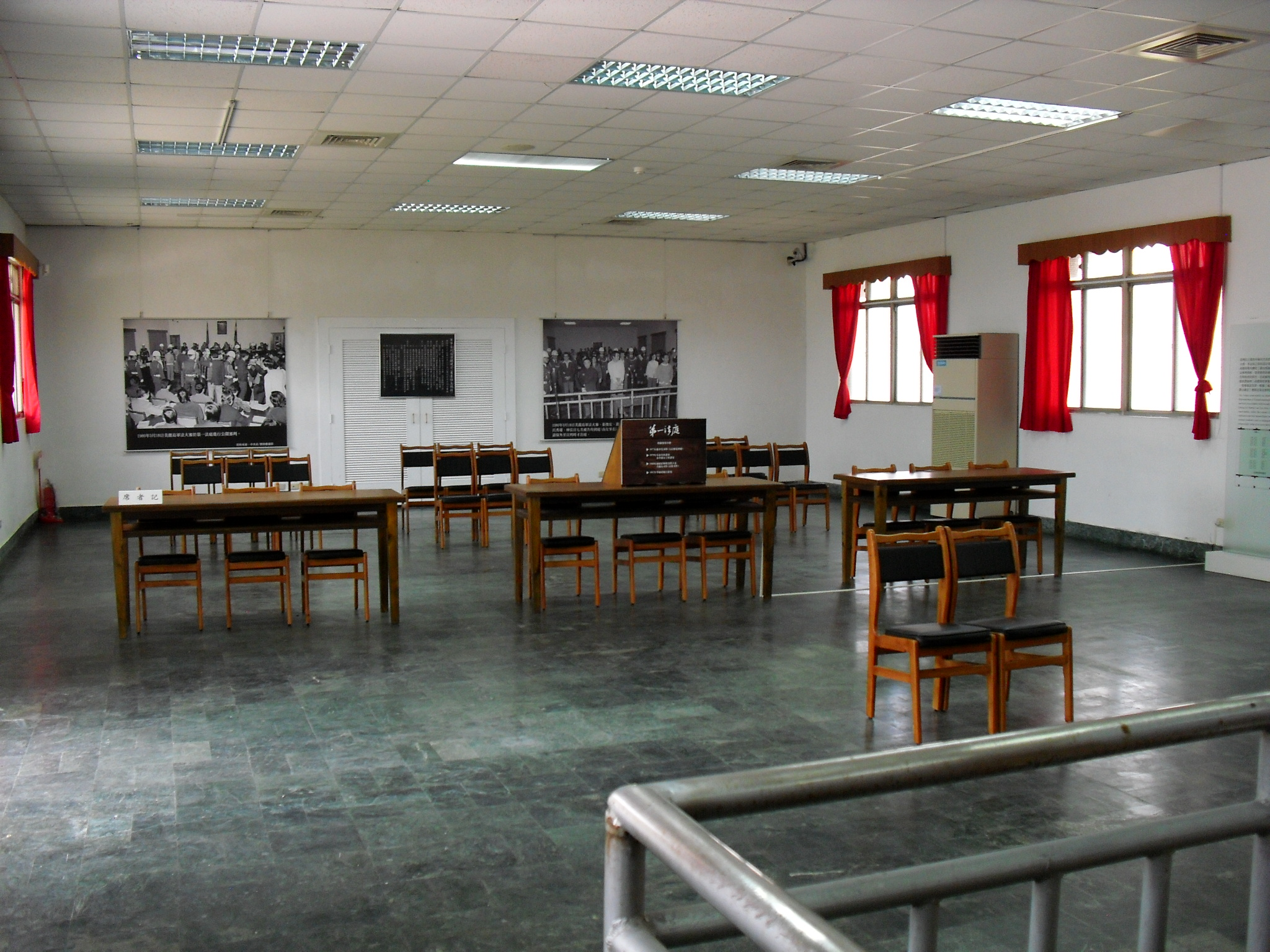
The museum interior

The Jing-Mei White Terror Memorial Park (traditional Chinese: 白色恐怖景美紀念園區; simplified Chinese: 白色恐怖景美纪念园区; pinyin: Báisè Kǒngbù Jǐngměi Jìniàn Yuánqū) is a museum in Xindian District, New Taipei City, Taiwan.

== History ==
The building used to serve as a military school from 1957 to 1967. It later housed military courts and a detention center called the Jingmei Military Detention Center (Chinese: 景美軍事看守所) for political dissidents during the White Terror period. Former prisoners in the detention center include Annette Lu, Chen Chu and Shih Ming-teh. In 1991, the center was closed.

In 2007, the center was turned into a human rights memorial and museum featuring Taiwan's democracy movement at the suggestion of Lu, who was then serving as Vice President. In early April 2009, the Council for Cultural Affairs changed the name of the site to Jing-Mei Human Rights Memorial and Cultural Park.

In 2018, the ownership has moved to the National Human Rights Museum established in the same year, who changed the name of the site to its current name Jing-Mei White Terror Memorial Park.

== Transportation ==
The museum is accessible within walking distance north west from Dapinglin Station of Taipei Metro.

== See also ==
- List of museums in Taiwan
- Green Island White Terror Memorial Park
