= White Terror (Taiwan) =

Period of martial law and political repression in Taiwan

- Part of Chinese Civil War, retreat of the government of the Republic of China to Taiwan, and Cold War
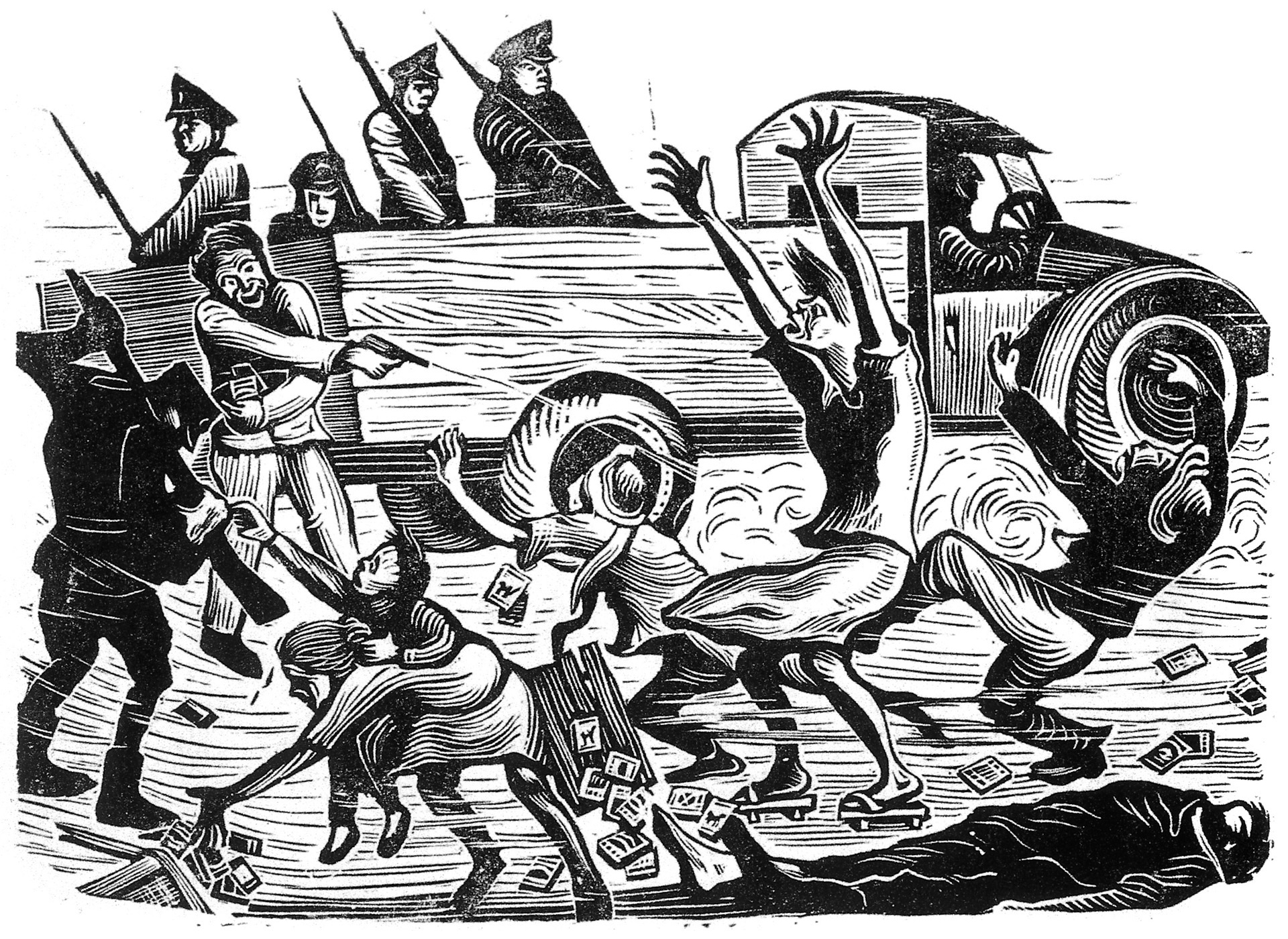
- The Horrifying Inspection by printmaker Huang Rong-can depicting the February 28 incident
- Location: Taiwan and other ROC-controlled islands
- Date: 1947–1992
- Target: Political dissidents, including leftists, liberals, independence activists, and intellectuals
- Attack type: Politicide, mass murder, political repression, police state
- Deaths: At least 3,000 to 4,000 executed, not including the 228 incident (18,000 to 28,000 killed) or extrajudicial executions
- Victim: At least 140,000 imprisoned
- Perpetrator: Government of the Republic of China (Taiwan) under the Kuomintang (KMT)
- Motive: Consolidate rule over Taiwan after retreat from mainland China

White Terror
- Chinese: 白色恐怖
- Literal meaning: White Terror
Transcriptions
Standard Mandarin
- Hanyu Pinyin: Báisè Kǒngbù
- Wade–Giles: Pai2-se4 K'ung3-pu4
Southern Min
- Hokkien POJ: Pe̍h-sek Khióng-pò͘

The White Terror (Chinese: 白色恐怖; pinyin: Báisè Kǒngbù; Pe̍h-ōe-jī: Pe̍h-sek Khióng-pò͘) was the political repression of Taiwanese civilians and political dissenters under the government ruled by the Kuomintang (KMT). The period is generally considered to have begun when martial law was declared in Taiwan on 19 May 1949, which was enabled by the 1948 Temporary Provisions against the Communist Rebellion, and ended on 21 September 1992 with the repeal of Article 100 of the Criminal Code, allowing for the prosecution of "anti-state" activities. The Temporary Provisions had been repealed a year earlier on 22 April 1991. Martial law had been lifted on 15 July 1987.

Two years after the 28 February incident, the KMT retreated from mainland China to Taiwan during the closing stages of the Chinese Civil War in 1949. Wanting to consolidate its rule on its remaining territories, the KMT imposed harsh political suppression measures, which included enacting martial law, executing suspected leftists or those they suspected to be sympathetic toward the communists. Others targeted included Taiwanese locals and indigenous peoples who participated in the 28 February incident, such as Uyongʉ Yata'uyungana, and those accused of dissidence for criticizing the government.

The KMT persecuted those who criticized or opposed the government, accusing them of attempting to subvert the regime, while dramatically expanding the scope of punishment throughout this period. It made use of the Taiwan Garrison Command (TGC), a secret police, as well as other intelligence units by enacting special criminal laws as tools for the government to purge dissidents. Basic human rights and the right to privacy were disregarded, with mass pervasive monitoring of the people, filings of sham criminal cases against anyone suspected of being a dissident, as well as labelling any individuals who did not conform to a pro-regime stance as communist spies, often without merit. Others were labeled as Taiwanese separatists and prosecuted for treason. It is estimated that about 3,000 to 4,000 civilians were executed by the government during the White Terror. The government was also suspected of carrying out extrajudicial killings against exiles in other countries. (Note: See Henry Liu and Chen Wen-chen.)

== Institutional methods of repression ==
Along with violence, the Kuomintang government used legal power and social control to maintain power during the White Terror. Under martial law declared in 1949, the KMT used offenses like overthrowing the government or threatening state stability to justify long, harsh prison sentences. Many of these cases were taken to military court, which made it much easier for the government to punish people who opposed the government. The legal action of the regime is shown by the arrests of the Kaohsiung Eight in 1979, who were leaders in a protest sparked by the arrests of 60 citizens involved in the “Formosa Magazine,” which opposed the government. The Kaoshing Eight faced trial in military courts and got 12 years to life in prison.

The government also used surveillance and security methods to keep control of the people in Taiwan. The Taiwan Garrison Command also was important for the KMT to identify citizens considered threats to the regime. Laws like the sedition law, repealed in 1992, allowed authorities to arrest suspected political opponents and jail them for at least seven years. These arrests helped the government keep control through fear and prevented dissent.

The KMT also used policies that impacted society in Taiwan to strengthen their regime. Land reform programs that started in 1949 redistributed land and reduced the power of local landowners. These policies helped the state’s authority in rural areas and allowed the KMT to collect rent for profit.

Education was also a tool for the government’s power throughout their reign. School curriculums taught children a pro-government attitude using military training courses, military anthem lessons, and new textbooks. The textbooks promoted Chinese identity and culture. These strategies allowed the KMT to keep control over Taiwan for 50 years, and prevented coup and revolution attempts.

== Time period ==
Declaration of Martial Law in Taiwan
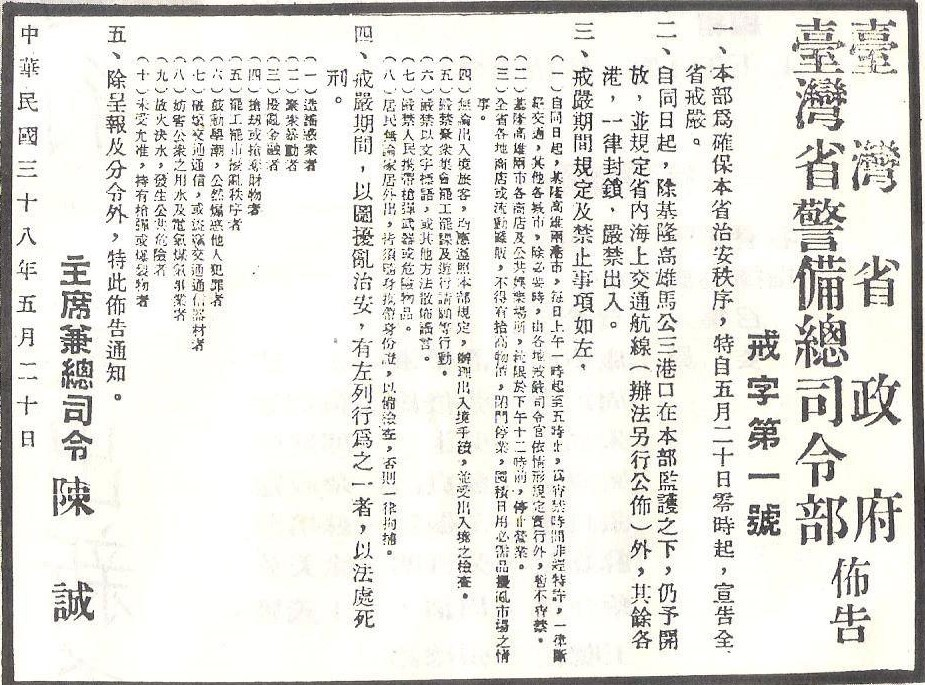
- Date effective: 20 May 1949
- Repealed: 15 July 1987

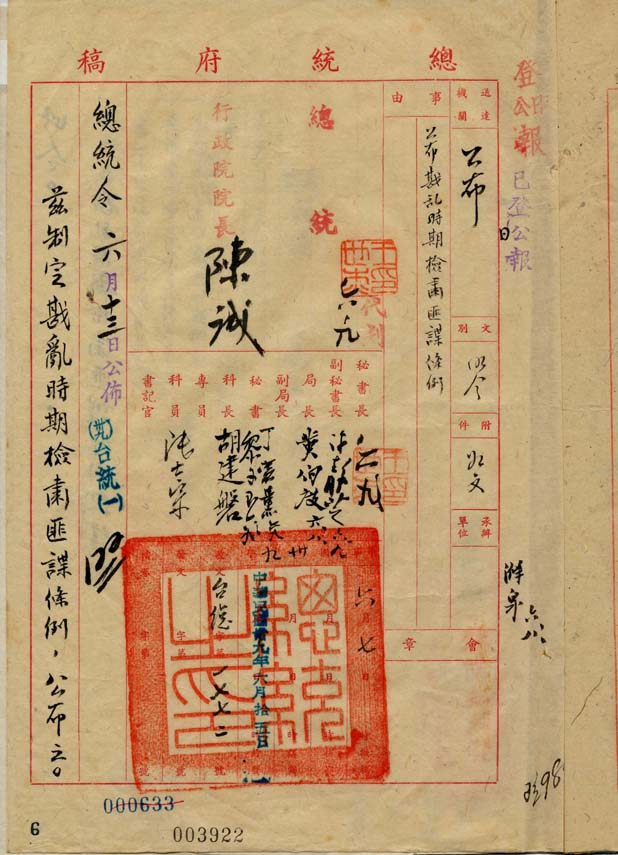
Presidential decree on 13th June 1950: Prosecuting Communist Bandits and spies during the Anti-rebellion Period

The White Terror is generally considered to have begun with the declaration of martial law on 19 May 1949. For its ending date, some sources cite the lifting of martial law on 15 July 1987, following the Lieyu Massacre, while others cite the repeal of Article 100 of the Criminal Code on 21 September 1992, which allowed for the persecution of people for "anti-state" activities. Martial law officially lasted for 38 years and 57 days, which was the longest period of martial law in the world at the time it was lifted. It is now the second longest, after Syria's 48-year period of martial law which lasted from 1963 to 2011.

Most prosecutions took place between the first two decades as the KMT wanted to consolidate its rule on the island. Most of those prosecuted were labeled by the Kuomintang (KMT) as "bandit spies", meaning communist spies, and punished as such, often with execution. Chiang Kai-shek once said that he would rather "mistakenly kill 1,000 innocent people than allow one communist to escape".

The KMT mostly imprisoned Taiwan's intellectuals and social elites out of fear that they might resist KMT rule or sympathize with communism and separatism. For example, the Formosan League for Reemancipation was a Taiwanese independence group established in 1947, which the KMT believed to be under communist control, leading to its members being arrested in 1950. The World United Formosans for Independence was persecuted for similar reasons. However, other prosecutions did not have such clear reasoning, such as in 1968, when Bo Yang was imprisoned for his choice of words in translating a Popeye comic strip. A large number of the White Terror's other victims were mainland Chinese, many of whom owed their evacuation to Taiwan to the KMT.

Many mainlander victims of White Terror, such as Bo Yang, Lei Chen, and Li Ao, moved on to promote Taiwan's democratization and the reform of the Kuomintang. In 1969, future president Lee Teng-hui was detained and interrogated for more than a week by the Taiwan Garrison Command, which demanded to know about his "communist activities" and told him "killing you at this moment is as easy as crushing an ant to death." Three years later he was invited to join the cabinet of Chiang Ching-kuo.

Fear of discussing the White Terror and the 28 February Incident gradually decreased with the lifting of martial law after the 1987 Lieyu massacre, culminating in the establishment of an official public memorial and an apology by President Lee Teng-hui in 1995. In 2008, President Ma Ying-jeou addressed a memorial service for the White Terror in Taipei. Ma apologized to the victims and their family members on behalf of the government and expressed the hope that Taiwan would never again experience a similar tragedy.

== Controversy ==
In 2009, former Presidential Policy Advisor Hsieh Tsung-min (who, along with Peng Ming-min and Wei Ting-chao, was sentenced to 10 years in prison for drafting the "Declaration of Self-Salvation of the Taiwanese People" in 1964 and was falsely imprisoned for 15 years for the 1971 Bank of America bombing in Taipei) and a group of political victims of the White Terror claimed that the martial law order issued by the Taiwan Provincial Garrison Headquarters that year had not been properly reported to Acting President Li Zongren, who then submitted it to the Legislative Yuan for ratification, and was therefore legally invalid. The Kuomintang government violated the personal freedom and property rights of some individuals by using the invalid martial law order, but the Judicial Yuan's Grand Justices refused to accept the constitutional interpretation. They demanded that the Control Yuan impeach the Grand Justices for dereliction of duty.

In 2010, Supervisory Committee member Huang Huangxiong and others submitted an investigation report pointing out that there were three martial law orders between 1948 and 1949. It is impossible to verify whether the second martial law order issued on May 20, 1949, was submitted to the Legislative Yuan for ratification in accordance with Article 3 of the Martial Law Act. If the third martial law order issued on November 22, 1949, was not issued by the President (Acting President Li Zongren was not in the territory of the Republic of China at the time and could not have signed the announcement, which was not in compliance with Article 39 of the Constitution), the formal requirements were incomplete and the legal procedures were flawed. The martial law order was invalid due to lack of formal legal effect, and the military court's jurisdiction was flawed. The property confiscated due to cases during the martial law period "may need to be re-examined", and of course there will be subsequent relief issues. However, the final legal determination of the relevant laws is made by the Judicial Yuan Grand Justices Conference.

Xie Congmin and others were excited about the results of the Control Yuan's investigation. They said that they were imprisoned because they were tried by military court during the martial law period. If the Control Yuan found that the martial law order was flawed, then the trial at that time would be untenable. They would apply to the Grand Justices for constitutional interpretation based on this investigation report, and seek redress and compensation for wrongful imprisonment.

Democratic Progressive Party legislator Guan Biling said that the implementation of martial law without following constitutional procedures was illegal and unlawful. "After the illegal martial law order was implemented, so many people's lives, freedom, and property were deprived and they were tried by military court. What should we do about this? We should carefully consider the national remedial system!" Tsai Tong-jung, a blacklisted legislator, also said: "Taiwanese people are innocent". The implementation of martial law has caused great harm to fellow Taiwanese people at home and abroad. He has been unable to return home for 30 years in the United States. He asked the government to investigate the relevant legal responsibilities and provide compensation.

In 2013, direct relatives of victims of the White Terror (Communist Spy Case) overseas came forward to demand redress and compensation for the ten-year prison sentence, but were rejected by the Republic of China government. The "Compensation Foundation for Unfair Rebellion and Spy Trials during the Martial Law Period" was facing closure on June 30, 2013. The victims and their families in these more than 30 unresolved cases had petitioned President Ma Ying-jeou to request an extension, but their petitions were all forwarded by the Presidential Office to the "Compensation Foundation for Unfair Rebellion and Spy Trials during the Martial Law Period," and thus were left unresolved. In addition, in early 2013, direct relatives of Chinese victims in the United States petitioned Legislator Lin Yu-fang overseas to request assistance for an extension, but Lin's office rejected the request on the grounds that "the organization has been closed and there is nothing else to do." In stark contrast, when more than 30 cases related to the February 28 Incident emerged in 2013 and applications were delayed due to overdue deadlines, DPP legislators immediately proposed to amend the law. As a result, the February 28 Incident Memorial Foundation has now been amended by the Legislative Yuan and its application for compensation has been postponed for another four years.

Regarding why the victims of the White Terror have not been rehabilitated, White Terror victim Lin Shuyang stated that: "Ideological issues are the most difficult to resolve... For the Kuomintang, they still believe that the anti-communist national policy of that year is unquestionable. Sympathizing with communists is like a kind of original sin... The Kuomintang only reviewed the "law enforcement procedures" of that year, but never wanted to make a public apology similar to the February 28 Incident."

== Rehabilitations ==
On December 5, 2017, the Legislative Yuan of the Republic of China passed the Act on Promoting Transitional Justice in its third reading. On May 31, 2018, the Transitional Justice Commission was officially established and began to redress cases from the White Terror period.

On October 5, 2018, the Transitional Justice Commission announced the first batch of people whose convictions were revoked by letter, revoking the convictions of 1,270 people, including Lin Qingyun.

On December 7, 2018, the Transitional Justice Commission announced the second batch of people whose convictions were revoked by letter, revoking the convictions of 1,505 people including Huang Zaoru. Among them, the convictions of five victims, including Cui Naibin, were revoked in the form of a judicial illegality decision similar to the verdict.

On February 27, 2019, the Transitional Justice Commission announced the third batch of people whose convictions were revoked by a meeting resolution, revoking the convictions of 1,056 people including Huang Dingjun. Among them, six victims, including Wang Xihe, had their convictions revoked in the form of judicial illegality decisions similar to the verdicts.

On May 30, 2019, the Commission for Promoting Transitional Justice announced the fourth batch of people whose convictions were revoked in the form of a meeting resolution, revoking the convictions of 2,006 people, including Xu Weichen. Among them, seven victims, including Liu Yongxiang, had their convictions revoked in the form of judicial illegality decisions similar to the verdicts.

In July 2021, Taiwan's National Human Rights Commission (NHRC) released its inaugural investigative report, officially exonerating early dangwai democracy advocate and former Taipei City Councilor Lin Shui-chuan (林水泉) of political persecution during the White Terror era. Following an unsuccessful independent run for the Taipei City Council in 1960, Lin was arbitrarily labeled a "hoodlum" by the Taiwan Garrison Command in 1961 and detained without due judicial process on Siaoliouciou Island for nearly two years. After winning a council seat in 1964, Lin was arrested again during a 1967 government crackdown on dangwai figures, tortured into giving a confession, and sentenced by a military court to 15 years in prison (later reduced to 10 years) on charges of subversion. While Lin had previously received state compensation and had his subversion conviction overturned, the 2021 NHRC report formally cleared him of the fabricated "hoodlum" designation after 60 years, citing his case as a prominent example of authoritarian abuse under Kuomintang rule.

== Victims ==
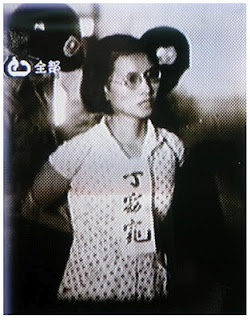
28-yr Ting Yao-tiao before execution after her toddler born in prison was forcibly removed

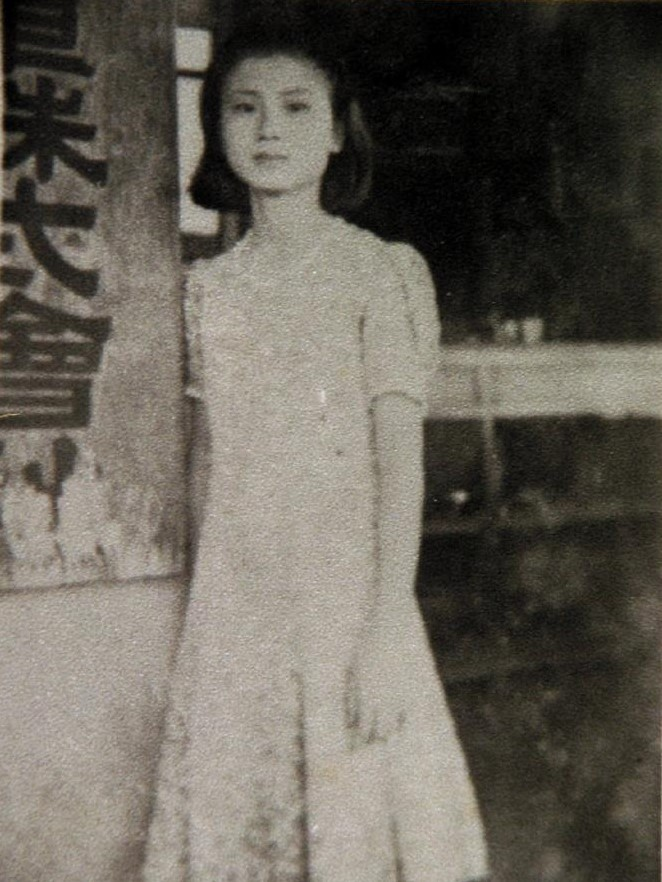
Shih Shui-huan, also executed by firing squad

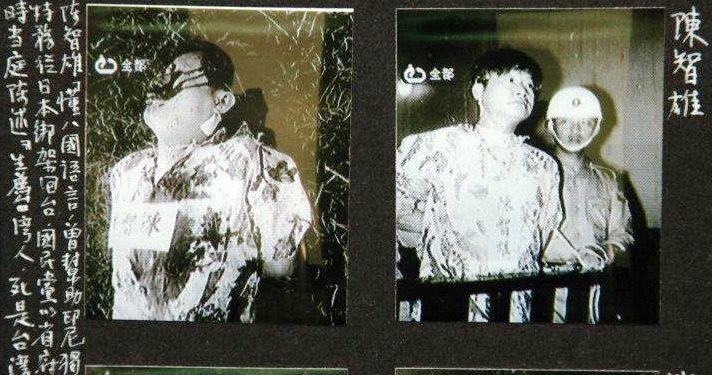
Taiwanese diplomat and independentist Chen Chih-hsiung after and prior to execution with his feet cut off by axe to be pulled by hands to the execution ground

Around 140,000 Taiwanese were imprisoned under harsh treatment during this period, with many either indirectly dying or suffering various health problems in the process. About 3,000 to 4,000 were directly executed for their real or perceived opposition to the KMT's Chiang Kai-shek government. Most of the victims of the White Terror were men, however, a number of women were tortured and/or executed.

=== Examples ===
- 1949: 6 April Incident, TGC besieged dormitories of NTU and NTNU to arrest students for a public protest incited by a bicycle traffic ticket, which started the precedent of Academic White Terror, the military custom of entering schools to arrest students and teachers.
- 1949: July 13 Penghu Incident, where secondary school students, refugees from Shandong province, were conscripted by force as soldiers on 13 July. Two school principals and five students were executed for attempting to report the incident.
- 1949–1955: ROC Navy White Terror, 1196 Navy servicemen were imprisoned with numerous members being executed.
- 1952: Chungli Yimin Middle School incident, where many teachers were arrested and executed.
- 1952: Luku incident (zh:鹿窟事件), during which 35 people were executed and 98 imprisoned.
- 1953: Aborigine leaders, including Major Yapasuyongʉ Yulunana and musician Uyongʉ Yata'uyungana, were arrested, then executed in 1954.
- 1953–1954: Polish civilian tanker Praca and general cargo ship Prezydent Gottwald were assaulted on the Pacific Ocean with 1 death in custody; 29 Chinese sailors were imprisoned for up to 35 years, with 3 being executed and 6 others dying while imprisoned.
- 1954: Tainan Post Office Case: 51 postal staff were arrested and tortured for a socialist book found on a desk; 14 were sentenced to prison, including a pregnant woman Ting Yao-tiao. Ting and her close friend Shih Shui-huan were executed two years later with Ting's daughter been born in prison being violently separated from the mother by the guard till her hair being torn off in 1956.
- 1954: Soviet civilian tanker Tuapse was privateered in high sea with 49 crew members being mistreated and detained up to 34 years, and 2 deaths and 1 suicide.
- 1955: Over 300 subordinate officers of pro-British/American general Sun Li-jen were arrested, tortured and imprisoned for high treason as communist spies. Sun was under house arrest for 33 years until 1988.
- 1957: May 24 incident, Chiang Ching-kuo's China Youth Corps along with military and police officers instigated anti-American riots after a shooting incident; Embassy of the United States was also sieged.
- 1960: Lei Chen, publisher of the Free China Journal and scholars organizing a democratic party were arrested, and imprisoned up to 10 years, where his memoir of his time in jail was incinerated.
- 1961: Su Tung-chi case: TGC arrested over 300 Taiwanese independence supporters in secret trials; the number held was reduced to 49 after reporting by French news agency AFP.
- 1963: Chen Chih-hsiung: Former ambassador of the Republic of Taiwan Provisional Government with Swiss citizenship being kidnapped by KMT agents from Tokyo in 1959, Japan, Chen was the first executed Taiwanese independentist. Not wanting to let Chen walk to the execution field like a valiant, the corporal jailers cut his feet off with an axe and dragged him by his arms to the execution field.
- 1966: Shin Sheng News Case: Following the first wave of persecution and execution in 1947, newspaper journalists were framed and persecuted as suspected communist spies. Reporter Shen Yuan-zhang was tortured to death naked by a rope cutting through the vagina, while her husband was beaten up next door to hear her screaming.
- 1968: Democratic Taiwan Union Case: Imprisonment of 36 writers including Chen Yingzhen and Chiu Yen-liang, who supported independence.
- 1972–1975: NTU Philosophy Department Incident: 13 professors including Robert Martin and Chao Tien-yi were framed and fired as "communism sympathisers" supported by John King Fairbank.
- 1978: After the US established diplomatic relations with China, the US envoy to Taipei was attacked by government-mobilized protesters with stones, metal bats, bamboo sticks eggs and paints outside Songshan Airport. Secretary of State Warren Christopher's car window was broken and Ambassador Leonard Unger's ears were injured and his eyeglasses broken. NCCU Dean admitted that schools were assigned a quota of students to participate in the incident, with transportation provided for thousands. Ministry of Education awarded the school staffs vacations to Japan and Korea two months later.
- 1979–1980: TGC arrested over 100 pro-democracy activists after a protest on 10 December 1979. Some were tortured, 8 court-martialed for rebellion, 37 charged in civilian courts, and 91 eventually released. This was later known as the Kaohsiung Incident.
- 1980: The mother and twin daughters of democracy activist Lin Yi-hsiung (arrested following the Kaohsiung incident) were stabbed to death on 28 February.
- 1981: Carnegie Mellon statistics professor Chen Wen-chen is found dead on 3 July after a long interrogation session with government officials during a visit to Taiwan.
- 1984: Journalist Henry Liu is assassinated at his home in Daly City, California for writings disparaging President of the Republic of China, Chiang Ching-kuo. The assassination is thought to have been orchestrated by Pai Wan-hsiang.
- 1987: 1987 Lieyu massacre: 24 Vietnamese refugees calling for help were killed and evidence was destroyed by the military. The ROC government denied that the incident occurred after it was reported by journalists and during questioning by the parliament.

== Legacy ==
Since the lifting of martial law in 1987, the government has set up the 228 Incident Memorial Foundation, a civilian reparations fund supported by public donations for the victims and their families. Many descendants of victims remain unaware that their family members were victims, while many of the families of victims, especially from mainland China, did not know the details of their relatives' mistreatment during the riot. The Taiwanese government also established the Transitional Justice Commission, which aimed to erase the authoritarian legacy of the KMT regime under Chiang and deliver justice to the families and relatives of the victims.

=== Oral Histories and Testimonies ===
In recent years, shifting social attitudes have encouraged more White Terror survivors to publicly recount their experiences of imprisonment and torture, often through oral histories and memoirs. The National Human Rights Museum and the Taiwan Human Rights Story House have collected extensive oral testimonies from survivors and their families, as well as published books and documentaries related to White Terror histories. Civil society groups have also played an active role in advancing transitional justice.

The book “Memories: A Witness of the White Terror” records the experiences of Chen Ming-chung, Yen Shih-hung, Huang Hua-chang, Chen Ying-tai, and others. Chen Ying-tai, who studied economics at National Taiwan University and was known for his exceptional memory, was recruited into the Communist Party by his classmate Cheng Wen-feng. He later meticulously documented the stories and life situations of the members of the underground organization, every person he met in prison, and former inmates after their release. Other survivors, such as Chang Chang-mei and Kao Chu-hua, have also publicly shared female victims’ experiences under the White Terror. In oral testimonies, Chang Chang-mei recounted witnessing fellow inmate Fu Ju-chih being led to execution and the forced separation of Ting Yao-tiao from her young daughter in prison, while in an interview, Kao Chu-hua has spoken about her experience of state-perpetrated sexual violence. Chang Chang-mei’s husband and a fellow White Terror victim, Ouyang Chien-hua, recorded forms of torture used against detainees through his artwork, now preserved by the National Human Rights Museum. Their eldest daughter, Ouyang Hui-chen, even adapted her parents’ stories into the stage play “Floating Lives: The One I Love is on Green Island”.

=== Film ===
- The 1958 film E.A. — Extraordinary Accident (Russian: Ч. П. — Чрезвычайное происшествие) by Viktor Ivchenko in 1958 tells the first year story of the Tanker Tuapse crew with the leading distribution of 47.5 million USSR viewers in 1959.
- Hou Hsiao-hsien's A City of Sadness, the first movie dealing with the February 28 incident, won the Golden Lion at the 1989 Venice Film Festival.
- The 1989 dark humor Banana Paradise is the second film of the Taiwan Modern Trilogy by Wang Toon, who applied a real cross-strait case reported in 1988 to develop the script with the preposterous irony of a Chinese Mainlander refugee couple's struggle living with fake identifications since the Chinese Civil War throughout the White Terror era till the reunion of divided families in 1988.
- The 1991 teen-crime drama A Brighter Summer Day by Edward Yang adopts a real street murder case in Taipei in 1961, where a group of high school students' lives were twisted by the gestapo-style Taiwan Garrison Command agents and the mafia activities in the military dependents' village. The film won the Best Film Award in the 36th Asia-Pacific Film Festival, Special Jury Prize in the Tokyo International Film Festival, Best Director Awards in the 13th Festival des 3 Continents and in the 5th Singapore International Film Festival.
- The 1995 romance Good Men, Good Women by Hou Hsiao-hsien based on the biography book named after the Japanese song <幌馬車の唄> in real life of Chiang Bi-Yu as a political prisoner (daughter of Chiang Wei-shui, starring Annie Yi in 3 interlude roles) to research the complexity of Taiwanese history and national identity.
- The 1995 blue drama Heartbreak Island, a winner of NETPAC Award in the 1996 International Film Festival Rotterdam describes the mind struggle flashbacks of a student activist being finally released after 10 years in prison for participating the 1979 Kaohsiung Incident, but only finding that her old comrades have changed to give up ideals and keep chilly distance.
- The 1995 film Super Citizen Ko by Wan Jen surrounding a political prisoner during martial law who looks for the grave of a friend who was executed.
- The 2000 criminal mystery Forgotten or Forgiven by Zhong-zheng Wang and Wei-jian Hong, portraits a grim police detective growing up from the harsh environment of a White Terror victim family follows a lead to discover the true identity of the low-profiled target, his partner's father, as actually a secret agency deserter with the repentance through life against the Agency who involved in his case, then solved the conundrum in 2 generations after the final showdown of the deserter confronting his old commander.
- The 2009 biography Prince of Tears by Yonfan, nominated for the Golden Lion at the 66th Venice International Film Festival and selected as the Hong Kong entry for the 82nd Academy Awards for Best Foreign Language Film, is a real-life story of Taiwanese actress Chiao Chiao (aka. Lisa Chiao), whose father was falsely accused and executed during the White Terror in 1950s. Then, her mother was also arrested, and she and her sister became homeless as their house was confiscated.
- The 2009 political thriller Formosa Betrayed by Adam Kane portraits an FBI investigator tracing multi-murder cases to find the truth, inspired by the real cases including the assassination of journalist Henry Liu in California in 1984, the unsolved death of Chen Wen-chen of Carnegie Mellon University in 1981, and the serial murders of Lin Yi-hsiung family in 1980.
- The 2019 horror film Detention, an adaptation of the eponymous video game based on true events, specifically the 1947 Keelung Senior High School Incident where dozens of students, teachers and journalists were either executed or imprisoned for political reasons during the White Terror.
- The 2019 VR film Bodyless by Prof. Hsin-Chien Huang of NTNU, Special Mention of 2019 Kaohsiung Film Festival, and Honorary Mention in the Computer Animation category of Prix Ars Electronica 2020, describes how the soul of a dead political prisoner left his jailed body in the suppressed environment of ROC military ruling with martial law, then finally freely found his way home.
- Historical film Untold Herstory about the detention of female political prisoners in the 1950s in Ludao Prison, in the beginning of the White Terror and the martial law.
- The 2025 film A Foggy Tale depicts the quest of a young girl from outside Chiayi who travels alone to Taipei to retrieve the body of her brother after he was executed by the Kuomintang during the White Terror period.

=== Literature ===
- Vern Sneider's novel A Pail of Oysters in 1953 was based on the officer's personal field survey revealing people's life in Taiwanese society under suppression in 1950s, was banned by Chinese Nationalists' authorities until being reissued in 2016 – 35 years after his death.
- Tehpen Tasi's autobiography Elegy of Sweet Potatoes (Japanese: 臺湾のいもっ子) in 1994, based on his testimony with the other political prisoners together for 13 months in 1954–1955.
- Julie Wu's The Third Son in 2013 describes the event and its aftermath from the viewpoint of a Taiwanese boy.
- Jennifer J. Chow's The 228 Legacy in 2013 focuses on how there was such an impact that it permeated throughout multiple generations within the same family.
- Shawna Yang Ryan's Green Island in 2016 tells the story of the incident as it affects three generations of a Taiwanese family.
- Ken Liu's The Paper Menagerie & Other Short Stories in 2016 includes a short story titled The Literomancer which references the 28 February incident from the perspective of a young American girl who had recently moved to Taiwan, and asks both her father, who works on an American military base, and a neighbor, and old man named Mr. Kan about the incident. It develops on these two different perspectives throughout the story, becoming progressively darker.
- Principle Jian Tian-lu's Hushen (姜天陸: 胡神), a 2019 literature award winner expresses the humanity concern in contrast with the brutality on the first scene of 1987 Lieyu massacre.
- Poet Hung-hung's The fog has no voice – mourning the souls lost in 7 March Incident (鴻鴻: 霧沒有聲音——悼三七事件亡魂), a eulogy poet in memory of the victims and refugees in 2024.

=== Television series ===
- Hotel Saltwater is a television series set in the late 1970s when Taiwan was under martial law and based on Chen Tseng-chih's 2017 book "Hotel Saltwater: Tai Chen-yao's Revolutionary Youth".

=== Games ===
- In 2014, Sharp Point Press and Future-Digi publicized the 'Rainy Port Keelung with 3 light novels telling a love story in the background of Keelung Massacre during the 28 Feb incident.
- In 2017, Taiwanese game developer Red Candle Games launched Detention, a survival horror video game created and developed for Steam. It is a 2D atmospheric horror side-scroller set in 1960s Taiwan under martial law following the 28 February incident. The critically acclaimed game also incorporates religious elements based on Taiwanese culture and mythology. Rely On Horror gave the game a 9 out of 10, saying that "every facet of Detention moves in one harmonious lockstep towards an unavoidable tragedy, drowning out the world around you."
- In 2017, Erotes Studio produced Blue Blood Lagoon with the story of high-school students running for life to escape from the bloodshed of military conscription arrest, prosecution and execution during the July 13 Penghu incident.
- In 2019, Team Padendon publicized a ghost RPG PAGUI based on a true family story of the Kaohsiung Massacre victims in 28 Feb Incident: An orphan raised by a temple uncovered his identity and looked for his dispersed family for over 60 years with no result until he died; an old lady in her 90s heard the news arrives but only find her son in the coffin.
- In 2020, MatchB Studio produced an adventure puzzle Halflight with two brothers playing near a base witnessed an execution site upon 28 Feb incident, and one fell missing in chaos, followed by the family being persecuted apart, so the little boy went back trying to find the younger brother, but only stepped into the worse ending in 50 years.

== Memorials ==
- 228 Peace Memorial Park
- Green Island White Terror Memorial Park
- Jing-Mei White Terror Memorial Park
- Tianma Tea House

== See also ==
- 1987 Lieyu massacre
- Anti-communism in China
- Anti-communist mass killings
- Campaign to Suppress Counterrevolutionaries
- Chiangism
- Chinese imperialism#political imperialism
- The dogs go and the pigs come
- Far-right politics#Taiwan (Republic of China)
- February 28 incident
- Green Terror (Taiwan)
- History of Taiwan
- History of the Kuomintang
- History of the Republic of China
- Kaohsiung Incident
- Minoritarianism#Taiwan (Waishengren)
- New Order (Indonesian mass killings of 1965–66)
- October Restoration in South Korea
- Political status of Taiwan
- Politics of Taiwan
- Period of mobilization for the suppression of Communist rebellion
- Radical anti-communism
- Shanghai massacre
- Wild Lily student movement

== Notes and references ==
=== Works cited ===
==== English language ====
- Chang, Kang-i Sun (2013). Journey Through the White Terror: A Daughter's Memoir. 國立臺灣大學出版中心. ISBN 978-986-03-5972-5.
- Chao, Linda (1997). Democracy's new leaders in the Republic of China on Taiwan. Stanford, Calif.: Hoover Institution on War, Revolution and Peace, Stanford University. ISBN 0817938028.
- Hartnett, Stephen J.; Shaou-Whea Dodge, Patrick; Keränen, Lisa B. (23 May 2019). "Postcolonial remembering in Taiwan: 228 and transitional justice as 'The end of fear'". Journal of International and Intercultural Communication. 13 (3): 238–256. doi:10.1080/17513057.2019.1614206. S2CID 182404851.
- Kerr, George H. (1965). Formosa Betrayed. Boston: Houghton Mifflin. OCLC 232303374.
- Lin, Sylvia Li-chun (Spring 2004). "Two Texts to a Story: Representing White Terror in Taiwan". Modern Chinese Literature and Culture. 16 (1): 37–64. JSTOR 41490913.
- Lin, Sylvia Li-chun (2007). Representing Atrocity in Taiwan: The 2/28 Incident and White Terror in Fiction and Film. New York: Columbia University Press. ISBN 9780231143608.
- Rowen, Ian (2021). Transitions in Taiwan : stories about the White Terror. Amherst, New York: Cambria Press. ISBN 978-1621966975.
- Schafferer, Christian (2003). The Power of the Ballot Box: Political Development and Election Campaigning in Taiwan. Lanham, Md.: Lexington Books. ISBN 0739104810.
- Tsai, Tehpen (4 May 2021). Elegy of Sweet Potatoes: Stories of Taiwan's White Terror. [S.l.]: Camphor Press Limited. ISBN 978-1-78869-243-4.

==== Chinese language (Traditional) ====
- 藍博洲, 1991, 幌馬車之歌.台北: 時報文化.
- 藍博洲, 1993, 白色恐怖.台北: 揚智.
- 魏廷朝, 1997, 台灣人權報告書, 1949–1995.台北: 文英堂.
- 台灣省文獻委員會編, 1998, 台灣地區戒嚴時期五零年代政治案件史料彙編(一): 中外檔案.南投: 台灣省文獻委員會.
- 呂芳上計劃主持, 1999, 戒嚴時期台北地區政治案件相關人士口述歷史: 白色恐怖事件查訪(上).台北: 台北市文獻委員會.
- 朱德蘭, 2001, 崔小萍事件, 南投: 省文獻會.
- 任育德, 2003, 從口述史看1950年代政治案件的女性受刑人, 近代中國第154期.
- 曹欽榮、鄭南榕基金會, 2012, 流麻溝十五號: 綠島女生分隊及其他, 臺北市, 書林出版.
- 顏世鴻, 2012, 青島東路三號: 我的百年之憶及台灣的荒謬年代, 臺北市, 啟動文化.
- 余杰, 2014, 在那明亮的地方 : 台灣民主地圖, 臺北市, 時報文化.
- 向陽主編, 2016, 打破暗暝見天光, 新北市, 國家人權博物館籌備處.
