= Taiwan Garrison Command =

Secret police force in the Republic of China (Taiwan) from 1945 to 1992

- 臺灣警備總司令部
- Active: September 1945 – 1 August 1992
- Country: Taiwan
- Branch: Ministry of National Defense
- Type: Secret police National security body
- Role: Suppression of anti-government elements
- Part of: Republic of China Armed Forces
- Garrison/HQ: Taipei
- Nickname: Ching-tsung (警總)

Commanders
- Notable commanders: Peng Meng-chi, Chen Shou-shan, Chou Chung-nan

Insignia
- Logo of Taiwan Garrison Command

Standard of the Commanding General of Taiwan Garrison

Flag of the units of Taiwan Garrison

The Taiwan Garrison Command (Chinese: 臺灣警備總司令部; pinyin: Táiwān Jǐngbèi Zǒngsīlìngbù) was a secret police and national security body under the Republic of China Armed Forces on Taiwan. The agency was established at the end of World War II, and operated throughout the Cold War. It was disbanded on 1 August 1992.

The Taiwan Garrison Command was responsible for suppressing activities viewed as promoting communism, democracy, and Taiwan independence.

== Organization ==
Taiwan Garrison Command was commanded by a three-star general officer and contained both officers or enlisted personnel from the Army, Marine Corps, Military Police, Political Warfare, or Intelligence Bureau; and members from the National Police Agency of the Ministry of the Interior, as well as civilian recruits from other colleges after special training. Because of security reasons, its military draftees were tagged and interviewed before the usual military recruit training.

== Involvement ==
Although officially a military division, Taiwan Garrison Command actually functioned as a secret police organization. It was actively involved in suppression of suspected Communist sympathizers or Taiwan Independence activists. Many pro-democracy activists were imprisoned as well. Famous cases include the arrest of Peng Ming-min, the Taiyuan Incident, and the Kaohsiung Incident. Also, it was rumored to have been involved in many politically motivated assassinations/murders, such as the murder of Lin Yi-hsiung's family and the murder of Dr. Chen Wen-chen.

The reputation of Taiwan Garrison Command is so notorious that its name symbolizes the authoritarian rule to which Taiwan was once subjected.

== History ==
=== Origins ===
The Taiwan Provincial Garrison Command (台灣省警備總司令部) was established on 1 September 1945 at Chongqing, with Chen Yi as its first commanding general. On the same day, the Governor Office of Taiwan Province (1 September 1945 — 16 May 1947) was formed, and Chen Yi was appointed Governor of Taiwan.

This command's major responsibilities included the repatriation of all Japanese nationals in Taiwan, transfer of authority over Taiwan to the Republic of China government, and maintenance of law and order. The agency was renamed as the All-Taiwan Provincial Garrison Command (台灣全省警備總司令部) and relocated to Taipei in 1947. Peng Meng-chi was appointed its new commanding general.

=== After the Retreat to Taiwan ===
In the beginning of 1949, as the Republic of China government was retreating to Taiwan in the final stages of the Chinese Civil War, the Command was re-designated as "Taiwan Provincial Garrison Command" and headed by Chen Cheng, who concurrently held the office of Governor of Taiwan. On 20 May 1949, Chen Cheng, in his capacity as commanding general for the province and its military governor, declared martial law in Taiwan. Immediately, the Taiwan Provincial Garrison Command was ordered to enforce Martial Law within Taiwan, excluding the areas Kinmen and Matsu of Fujian Province, which had been under Martial Law since 10 December 1948.

On 15 August 1949, it was further split into Southeast Military Governor Office (zh:東南軍政長官公署; 1949-08-15—1950-03-16) and Taiwan Provincial Security Command (台灣省保安司令部), with Peng Meng-chi appointed as commanding general. The Southeast Military Governor Office, headed by Chen Cheng, was responsible for the defense of four provinces: Jiangsu, Zhejiang, Fujian and Taiwan; and was directly responsible for the systematic killing of thousands of Taiwanese social elites, as part of what became known as the February 28 incident.

In 1958, the Republic of China government underwent a series of restructuring, and Taiwan Provincial Security Command was merged with Taiwan Provincial Civil Defense Command (台灣省民防司令部), Taiwan Defense Command (台灣防衛總司令部), and Taipei Garrison Command (台北衛戌總司令部), becoming the Taiwan Garrison Command under the command of Huang Chen-chiu, the commander of the defunct Taipei Garrison Command.

The Taiwan Garrison Command was involved in the 1980 murder of lawyer and opposition politician Lin I-hsiung and his family.

=== Disbanding ===
Taiwan Garrison Command continued to enforce Martial Law until 14 July 1987, the lift of Martial Law over Taipei City, Kaohsiung City, and Taiwan Province by a presidential order from Chiang Ching-kuo. On 30 April 1991, President Lee Teng-hui declared the termination of the Period of Communist Rebellion and Taiwan Garrison Command again lost its other lawful justification.

This military organization was transformed and restructured into the "Coast Guard Command and Military Reserve District Command" on 1 August 1992. The move effectively disbanded the Taiwan Garrison Command, under quiet orders from then President Lee Teng-hui:

- Coastal patrol duties were assumed by the Coastal Guard Command; and were later passed to the newly reformed Coast Guard Administration.
- Subordinate units for military reserve mobilization were regrouped into Military Reserve District Command, and later, the Reserve Command.
- Electronic intelligence units for telephone-wire-tapping and radio surveillance were assigned to the Military Intelligence Bureau.
- Duties to suppress unauthorized radio broadcasting were then transferred to the Telecommunication Directorate of the Ministry of Transportation and Communications.
- Functions for imprisoning political and dissents activists and re-educating gangsters without trial were terminated. All prison facilities were transferred to either the Military Police Command, or to the Culture Establishment Commission for memorial purposes.
- Task of riot control were shared by the National Police Agency and the Military Police Command.
- The defense of Taipei City were taken over by the Military Police Command.
- The responsibility for censoring and confiscating questionable publications or newspapers went to the Government Information Office; such functions were later terminated after the abolishment of "the Law of Publications."

=== Transitional justice ===
The transitional justice process began shortly after the Taiwan Garrison Command was disbanded. The Transitional Justice Commission is charged with overseeing the process and as of 2019 was still in operation.

== See also ==
- February 28 incident
- Kaohsiung Incident
- Lin Yi-hsiung
- Military Police Command
- Republic of China Armed Forces
- Taipei Broadcasting Station
- White Terror (Taiwan)
- Military Intelligence Bureau
