= Peng Meng-chi =

ROC Army officer and diplomat (1908–1997)

- 彭孟緝
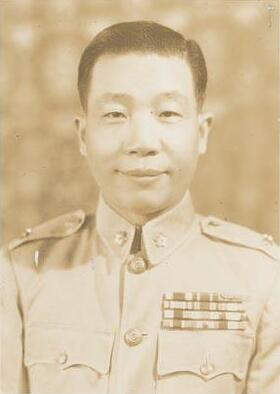

ROC Ambassador to Japan
- In office 1969–1972
- Preceded by: Chen Chih-Mai
- Succeeded by: Position abolished

ROC Ambassador to Thailand
- In office 1966–1969
- Succeeded by: Shen Chang-huan

Personal details
- Born: 12 September 1908 Hubei, Qing Empire
- Died: 19 December 1997 (aged 89) Taipei, Taiwan
- Education: Republic of China Military Academy
- Nickname: "The Butcher of Kaohsiung"

Military service
- Allegiance: Republic of China
- Branch/service: Republic of China Army
- Years of service: 1937-1966
- Rank: General
- Commands: Kaohsiung Fortress; Taipei Garrison Command
- Battles/wars: Northern Expedition; Second Sino-Japanese War; Battle of Shanghai; Battle of Changsha (1939)

Peng Meng-chi (Chinese: 彭孟緝; pinyin: Péng Mèngqī; 12 September 1908 – 19 December 1997) was a Republic of China Army officer and Republic of China diplomat. He held a position in the National Revolutionary Army and was a member of the Kuomintang. Following the retreat of the Republic of China to Taiwan, Peng served as commander of Kaohsiung Fortress in Taiwan. During and in the aftermath of the February 28 incident in 1947, he pursued a suppressive policy and ordered a massacre in Kaohsiung, earning him the nickname "Butcher of Kaohsiung" (高雄屠夫).

== Early life and military career ==
Peng was born 1908 in Hubei, China. He joined the National Revolutionary Army led by Chiang Kai-shek after graduating from the Whampoa Military Academy.

== February 28 incident and massacre ==
Peng Meng-chi was commander of Kaohsiung Fortress at the start of the February 28 incident in 1947. Chen Yi, who was chief executive of Taiwan Province, received a telegram from Chiang Kai-shek that reinforcements would arrive from Shanghai and created the "228 Incident Settlement Committee" to stall for time.

On 6 March 1947, prior to the arrival of the troops, three prominent Kaohsiung civilians including the mayor of Kaohsiung visited Peng to present conditions of peace. They were promptly arrested and executed. Peng gave orders to move on Taiwanese protestors gathered in public places, and Peng's military forces indiscriminately killed in the streets of Kaohsiung for three days, earning him the moniker "Butcher of Kaohsiung" or "Kaohsiung Butcher" (高雄屠夫). According to the report sent to the Nanking government, the assault killed 500 to 600 civilians.

Meanwhile, as a battalion from the 21st Division arrived in Chiayi on 11 March, Peng sent a regiment to Chiayi the next day. The Settlement Committee asked local legislators including Tan Teng-pho, Phuan Bok-tsi (潘木枝) and Kho Lin (柯麟) to go the airport to negotiate with the Kuomintang. They were arrested upon arrival, and only the three female members of the Settlement Committee were allowed to leave. By the end of the month, Tan Teng-pho, Phuan Bok-tsi, Kho Lin were executed.

== Later career ==
Following his military career, Peng served as the ROC ambassador to Thailand from 1966 to 1969, then as ambassador to Japan from 1969 to 1972.

After the Taiwanese Tainan Little League won in the 1971 Little League World Series, the team was formally received by Peng in Tokyo. Historian Andrew Morris noted the irony of a team made up of mostly southern Taiwanese children meeting with a man dubbed "The Murderer King" who was involved in the murderous episode in Kaohsiung.

== Death and legacy ==
Peng died on 19 December 1997. In the obituary written by his son Peng Yin-kang, the civilians slaughtered by Peng's forces five decades prior were described as "a ruthless group of violent citizens" whom Peng had no choice but to shoot. Tu Kuang-ming, son of Tu Shih-wen who died, sued Peng's son for defamation. The high court decision stated:

...this defamation suit was concerned with the historical truth of the February 28 Incident in 1947. But the Incident in the past was not allowed to talk about, and it was not until the lift of the Martial Law Decree that this Incident was openly discussed and investigations conducted. Even today, its historical facts were still not clear. Moreover, historical facts are different from legal facts. Although some new reports on the Incident have been released [which argued for Mr. Tu and against for Mr. Peng], they hardly provide any help for this court to decide on this case. This court stood in no position to decide any historical truth.

In 2022, prior to United States Speaker of the House Nancy Pelosi’s highly covered visit to Taiwan, Peng Yin-kang took out a newspaper ad to express his opposition to the visit. In response Democratic Progressive Party legislator Wang Ting-yu wrote a Facebook post characterizing him as “son of the butcher in the 228 incident, helping China threaten Taiwan.” Peng sued Wang for public insult and libel; the court found Wang not guilty in the first trial, citing documents and public information that corroborate his opinion.

=== Transitional justice initiatives ===
In 2017, at the 70th anniversary of the February 28 incident and subsequent March massacre, several academics as well as members of the Taiwan Statebuilding Party called for naming Chiang Kai-shek and Peng Meng-chi as main culprits of the massacre in Kaohsiung. The director of the 228 Memorial Museum Yang Chen-lung said the total death toll was absolutely more than 600 people, with many going missing. Yang's uncle was a victim in the massacre as well, and his family was too scared report his death until 16 years later.

In August 2020, the Transitional Justice Commission exonerated 24 political convicts who were arrested, charged, or executed in the February 28 incident, including the three Kaohsiung residents that Peng ordered to execute.
