= Tsai Ing-wen =

President of the Republic of China from 2016 to 2024

- 蔡英文
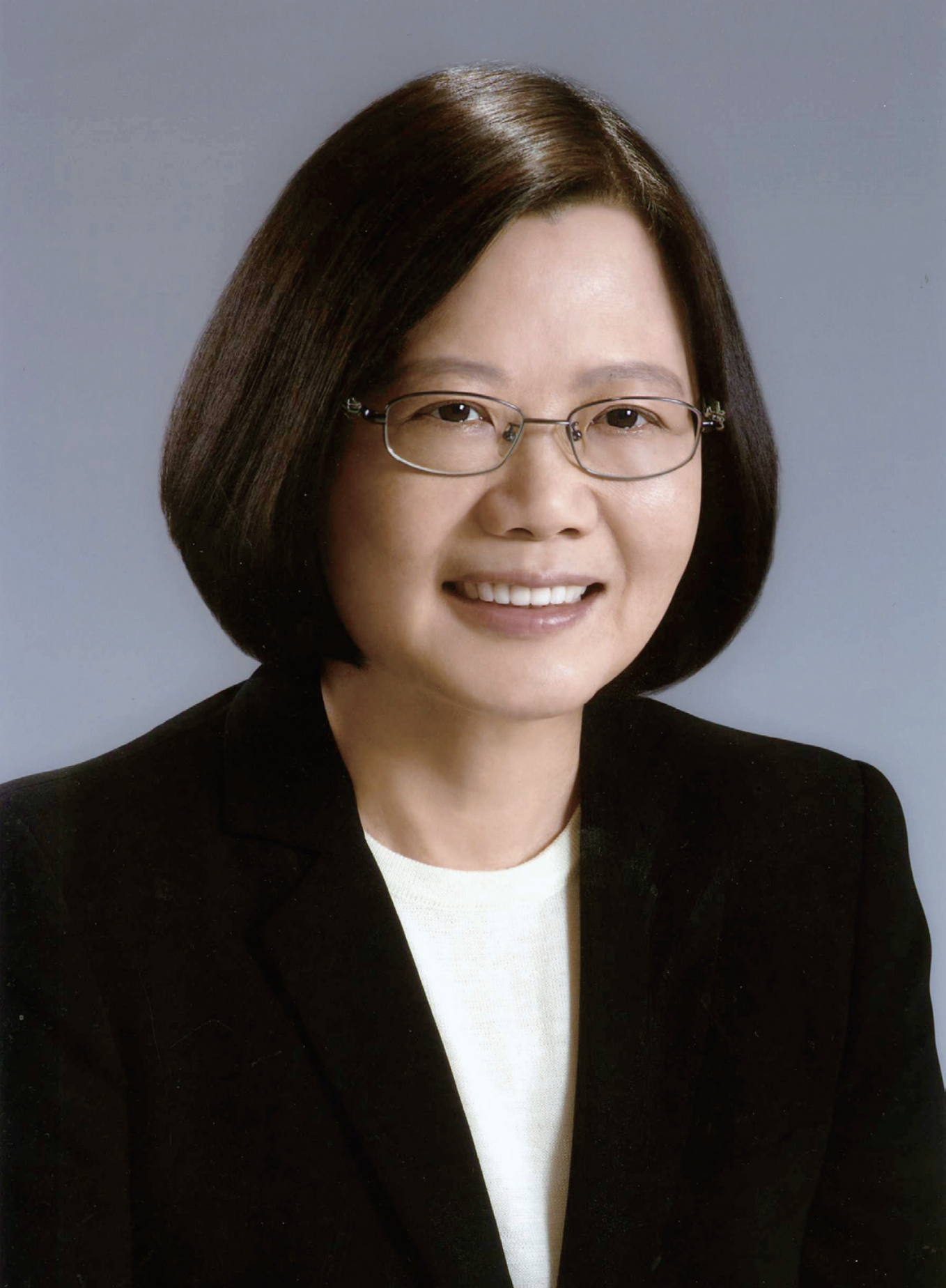
- Official portrait, 2016

7th President of the Republic of China
- In office 20 May 2016 – 20 May 2024
- Premier: See list: Lin Chuan Lai Ching-te Su Tseng-chang Chen Chien-jen
- Vice President: Chen Chien-jen; Lai Ching-te
- Preceded by: Ma Ying-jeou
- Succeeded by: Lai Ching-te

13th, 15th & 17th Chair of the Democratic Progressive Party
- In office 20 May 2020 – 26 November 2022
- Secretary General: Lin Hsi-yao
- Preceded by: Cho Jung-tai
- Succeeded by: Chen Chi-mai (acting)
- In office 28 May 2014 – 24 November 2018
- Secretary General: Joseph Wu; Hung Yao-fu
- Preceded by: Su Tseng-chang
- Succeeded by: Lin Yu-chang (acting)
- In office 20 May 2008 – 29 February 2012 (Note: Ker Chien-ming was acting secretary general from 11 March 2011 – 27 April 2011)
- Secretary General: See list: Wang Tuoh Wu Nai-ren Su Jia-chyuan
- Preceded by: Frank Hsieh (acting)
- Succeeded by: Chen Chu (acting)

26th Vice Premier of the Republic of China
- In office 25 January 2006 – 21 May 2007
- Premier: Su Tseng-chang
- Preceded by: Wu Rong-i
- Succeeded by: Chiou I-jen

Member of the Legislative Yuan
- In office 1 February 2005 – 24 January 2006
- Succeeded by: Wu Ming-ming
- Constituency: Party-list (DPP)

6th Minister of the Mainland Affairs Council
- In office 20 May 2000 – 20 May 2004
- Premier: Tang Fei; Chang Chun-hsiung; Yu Shyi-kun
- Deputy: Chen Ming-tong
- Preceded by: Su Chi
- Succeeded by: Joseph Wu

Personal details
- Born: 31 August 1956 (age 70) Zhongshan District, Taipei, Taiwan
- Party: Democratic Progressive (since 2004)
- Education: National Taiwan University (LLB); Cornell University (LLM); London School of Economics (PhD)
- Scientific career
- Fields: Law and economics
- Thesis: Unfair trade practices and safeguard actions (1983)
- Doctoral advisor: Michael Elliott

Tsai Ing-wen
- "Tsai Ing-wen" in Chinese characters
- Traditional Chinese: 蔡英文
- Simplified Chinese: 蔡英文
- Hanyu Pinyin: Cài Yīngwén
Transcriptions
Standard Mandarin
- Hanyu Pinyin: Cài Yīngwén
- Bopomofo: ㄘㄞˋ ㄧㄥ ㄨㄣˊ
- Gwoyeu Romatzyh: Tsay Ing'wen
- Wade–Giles: Tsʻai^{4} Ying^{1}-wên^{2}
- Tongyong Pinyin: Cài Yingwún
- Yale Romanization: Tsài Yīngwén
- MPS2: Tsài Yīng-wén
- IPA: [tsʰâɪ íŋ.wə̌n]
other Mandarin
- Xiao'erjing: تْسَےْ يٍڭوېنْ
Wu
- Wugniu: tshe^{5} in^{1} ven^{2}
- IPA: Shanghainese: [tshe˧ in˦ vən˨]
Hakka
- Romanization: Tshai Yîn-vun
Yue: Cantonese
- Yale Romanization: Choi Yīng-màhn
- Jyutping: coi^{3} jing^{1} man^{4}
- IPA: [tsʰɔj˧ jɪŋ˥.mɐn˩]
Southern Min
- Hokkien POJ: Chhòa Eng-bûn
- Tâi-lô: Tshuà Ing-bûn

Tsai Ing-wen (Chinese: 蔡英文; pinyin: Cài Yīngwén; born 31 August 1956) is a Taiwanese politician and legal scholar who served as the 7th president of the Republic of China from 2016 to 2024. A member of the Democratic Progressive Party (DPP), she was the first woman to serve in the office.

Born in Zhongshan District, Taipei, Tsai graduated from National Taiwan University in 1978, earned a master's degree in law from Cornell University in 1980, and earned her doctorate in law from the London School of Economics in 1984 before becoming a law professor. Appointed to government positions by the ruling Kuomintang (KMT) in 1993, she was one of the chief drafters of the special state-to-state relations doctrine under President Lee Teng-hui. During Chen Shui-bian's first term, she chaired the Mainland Affairs Council, before joining the DPP in 2004 and serving briefly in the Legislative Yuan. She was appointed Vice Premier under Su Tseng-chang but resigned in 2007.

Following the DPP's defeat in the 2008 presidential election, Tsai was elected party chair, a position she held three times (2008–2012, 2014–2018, and 2020–2022). In 2011, she became the first woman nominated as a presidential candidate by a major Taiwanese party, narrowly defeating Su Tseng-chang in the DPP primary. She lost the 2012 presidential election to incumbent Ma Ying-jeou before winning the 2016 presidential election by a landslide against Eric Chu. She was re-elected in 2020 over Han Kuo-yu and was succeeded by Lai Ching-te.

== Early life and career ==
Tsai was born at Mackay Memorial Hospital in Zhongshan District, Taipei City, on 31 August 1956. She was the youngest of eleven children. Her father, Tsai Chieh-sheng (1918–2006), was a businessman who ran an auto repair shop, and her mother, Chang Chin-fong (1925–2018), was a housewife. Chieh-sheng was of Hakka Chinese descent while Chin-fong was an aboriginal Taiwanese member of the Paiwan. Tsai also has two pet cats, Tsai Xiang Xiang and Tsai a-tsai. Both were stray cats that Tsai adopted.

Tsai went to high school at Taipei Municipal Zhongshan Girls High School. She chose to study law at the behest of her father. After graduation, she studied law at National Taiwan University and graduated with her Bachelor of Laws (LL.B.) in 1978. Tsai then completed graduate studies in the United States at Cornell University, where she earned a Master of Laws (LL.M.) from Cornell Law School in 1980. She chose to pursue doctoral studies afterwards in England at the London School of Economics and was awarded a Ph.D. in law from the University of London in 1984.

After she received her doctorate, Tsai returned to Taiwan and taught law at the School of Law of Soochow University and National Chengchi University, both in Taipei. In the 1990s, Tsai was also appointed to the Fair Trade Commission and the Copyright Commission. She served as consultant for the Mainland Affairs Council and the National Security Council. She also led the drafting team on the Statute Governing Relations with Hong Kong and Macau (Chinese: 港澳關係條例).

== Rise in politics ==
In 2000, Tsai was given the high-profile appointment of chair of the Mainland Affairs Council. Confirming the widely held belief that she maintained Pan-Green sympathies, Tsai joined the Democratic Progressive Party (DPP) in 2004. She was subsequently nominated by the DPP to be a candidate in the 2004 legislative election and was elected as a legislator-at-large.

On 26 January 2006, Tsai was appointed to the post of vice president of the Executive Yuan, a position commonly referred to as vice premier. She concurrently served as chairwoman of the Consumer Protection Commission.

On 17 May 2007, Tsai, along with the rest of the cabinet of out-going Premier Su Tseng-chang, resigned to make way for incoming Premier Chang Chun-hsiung and his cabinet. Premier Chang named Chiou I-jen, the incumbent secretary-general of the Presidential Office to replace Tsai as vice premier. She then served as the chair of TaiMedBiologics, a biotechnology company based in Taiwan. The Kuomintang accused Tsai of contracting government work out to TaiMedBiologics during her term as vice premier, while planning to leave the government and lead the company afterward. She was later cleared of all alleged wrongdoing.

In Kuomintang candidate Ma Ying-jeou's search for his running mate for the 2008 ROC presidential election, Tsai, a DPP member, was surprisingly suggested. Ma stated that there were no set criteria for a running mate, that his search would not be defined by gender, occupation, or even party affiliation.

On 19 May 2008, Tsai defeated Koo Kwang-ming in the election for DPP chair, and succeeded outgoing Frank Hsieh as the 12th-term chair of the party. She was the first woman to chair a major Taiwanese political party.

== DPP chair ==
=== First term: 2008–2012 ===
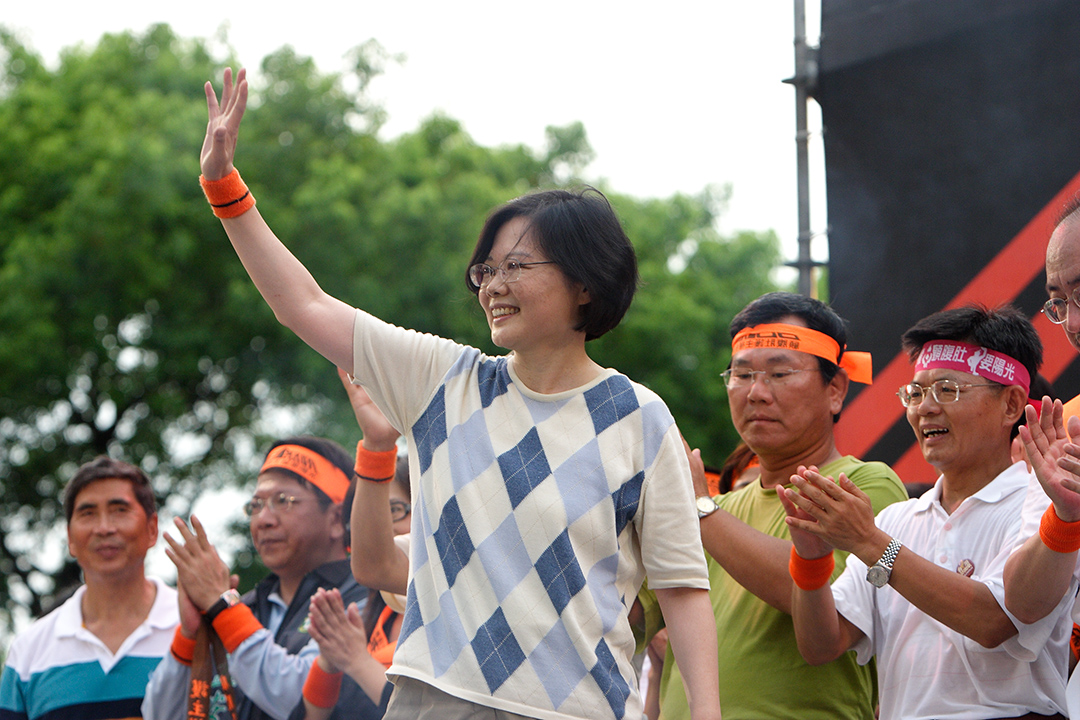
Tsai as the leader of the DPP participated in a rally hosted by the DPP in 2008.

Tsai took office on 20 May 2008, the same day Ma Ying-jeou was inaugurated as president. She said that DPP would work to deepen the Taiwanese localization movement while defending social justice. She criticized Ma for mentioning closer Cross-Strait relations but nothing about Taiwan's sovereignty and national security.

On 25 April 2010, Tsai participated in a televised debate against President and Kuomintang chairman Ma Ying-jeou over a proposed trade agreement, the Economic Cooperation Framework Agreement (ECFA); while President Ma believed ECFA would increase Taiwanese exports to mainland China and lower unemployment rates, Tsai said it "will force Taiwan to open up for cheap Chinese exports eventually" and certain domestic industries will be harmed by the mainland trade invasion. Tsai also said that the pact "will make Taiwan lose its independence in cross-strait relations and become a Chinese parasite" and that Taiwan should negotiate with China under the multilateral-framework World Trade Organization, which would offer more trade protections and emphasize Taiwan's distinct status.

Under Tsai's leadership, along with some of KMT's unpopular policies, the DPP regained momentum in elections of 2009, after major defeats from 2006 to 2008. In 2010, she was re-elected as the chair of the DPP.

Tsai resigned as chair of the DPP after losing her 2012 presidential election bid to incumbent Ma Ying-jeou.

=== Second term: 2014–2018 ===
On 15 March 2014, Tsai announced that she would once more run for party chief of the DPP against incumbent Su Tseng-chang and Frank Hsieh. However, both Su and Hsieh dropped out of the election in the aftermath of the Sunflower Student Movement. Tsai defeated Kaohsiung County deputy commissioner Kuo Tai-lin by 79,676 votes.

Tsai led the DPP to an historic victory in the local elections held on 29 November 2014, in which the party secured leadership of 13 of Taiwan's 22 municipalities and counties. The DPP's stunning victory in the elections strengthened Tsai's position within the party and placed her as the front-runner in the 2016 Presidential Elections; she announced her second bid for the Presidency on 15 February 2015. On 16 January 2016, she won the election by a landslide, winning 56.1% of votes, beating her opponent Eric Chu, who won 31.1% of the votes.

On 24 November 2018, she resigned as leader of the Democratic Progressive Party and refused Premier Lai Ching-te's resignation after a major defeat in local elections.

=== Third term: 2020–2022 ===
Tsai resumed the Democratic Progressive Party leadership from Cho Jung-tai on 20 May 2020, when she was inaugurated for her second presidential term. She resigned as party leader following the 2022 Taiwanese local elections.

== Presidential campaigns ==
=== 2012 ===
On 11 March 2011, Tsai Ing-wen officially announced her run for the presidential nomination of the Democratic Progressive Party. On 27 April 2011, Tsai became the first female presidential candidate in Taiwan after she defeated former Premier Su Tseng-chang by a small margin in a nationwide phone poll (of more than 15,000 samples) that served as the party's primary. Tsai ran against incumbent President Ma Ying-jeou of the Kuomintang and James Soong of the People First Party in the 5th direct presidential election, which was held on 14 January 2012. Garnering 45.63% of the vote, she conceded defeat to President Ma in an international press conference, resigning her seat as Chairman of the DPP.

=== 2016 ===
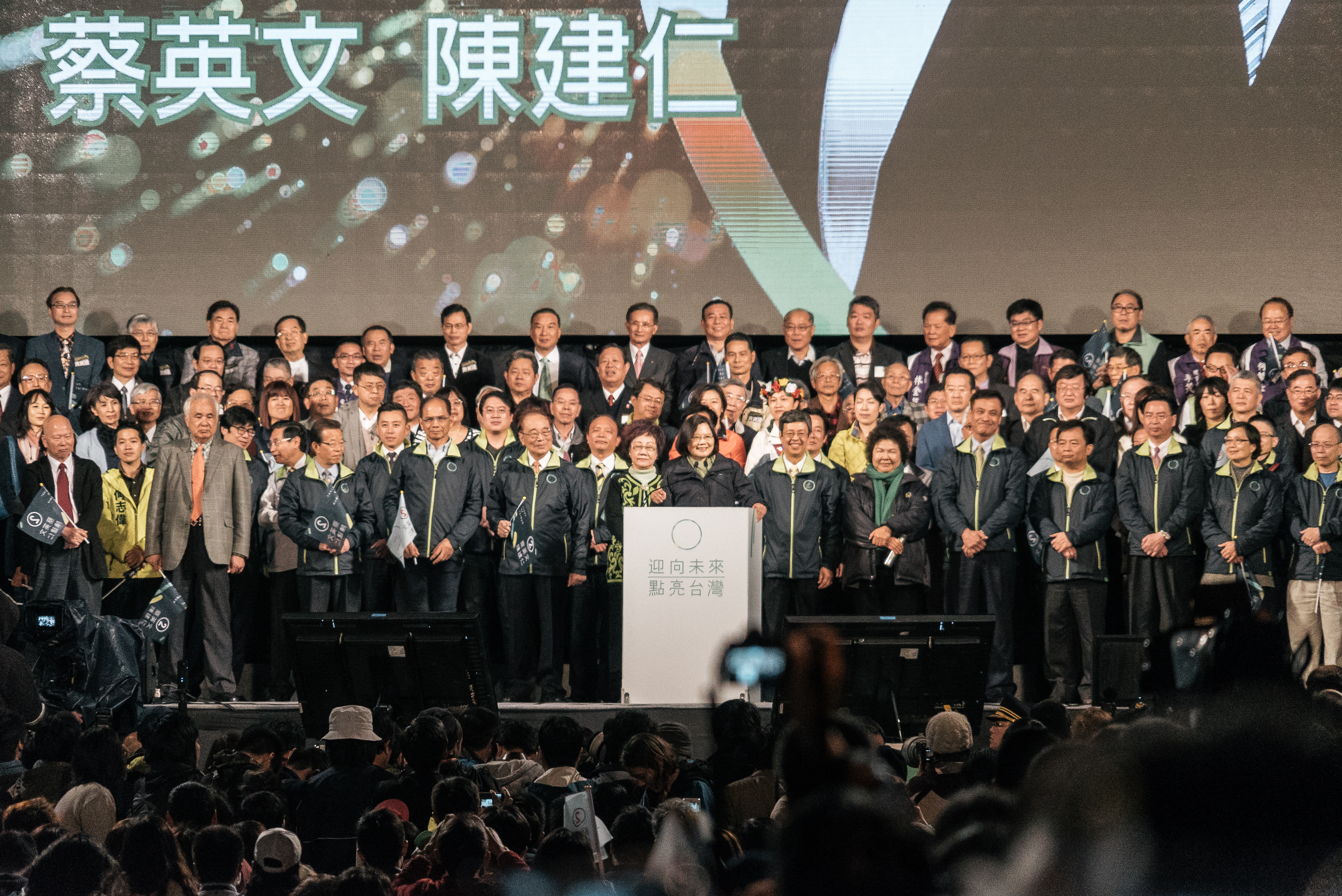
Tsai at campaign headquarters, 2016

On 15 February 2015, Tsai officially registered for the Democratic Progressive Party's presidential nomination primary. Though Lai Ching-te and Su Tseng-chang were seen as likely opponents, Tsai was the only candidate to run in the primary and the DPP officially nominated her as the presidential candidate on 15 April.

During summer of 2015, Tsai embarked on a visit to the United States and met a number of US policy makers including Senators John McCain and Jack Reed. In her speech addressing Taiwanese diaspora on the east coast of the United States, Tsai signaled a willingness to cooperate with the rising Third Party coalition in Taiwan in the incoming general election. On 14 November, Tsai's campaign announced that she had chosen Chen Chien-jen as DPP vice presidential candidate. On 16 January 2016, Tsai won the presidential election, beating her opponent Eric Chu by a margin of 25.04%. Tsai was inaugurated as president on 20 May 2016.

After her election, Tsai was named one of "The 100 Most Influential People" in TIME magazine 2 May 2016 issue.

=== 2020 ===
Tsai announced on 19 February 2019 via an interview with CNN that she would run for reelection as president in 2020. She registered to run in the Democratic Progressive Party presidential primary on 21 March 2019. Tsai defeated Lai Ching-te in the primary, and the Democratic Progressive Party nominated her as its candidate for the 2020 presidential election on 19 June 2019. Tsai and Lai formed the Democratic Progressive Party ticket on 17 November 2019.

During the campaign Tsai emphasized her administration's progressive reforms and support for social justice, national security, and democratic values. Initially, Tsai's approval ratings were low and she was expected to lose. However, amid the backdrop of the widely followed pro-democracy protests in Hong Kong, Tsai's firm rejection of unification with China and her commitment to defend Taiwan's sovereignty translated into a notable increase in public support.

Tsai won a landslide victory with a record of 8.17 million votes, representing 57.1% of the popular vote, the highest vote share won by a DPP candidate in presidential elections. She was sworn in for her second term on May 20, 2020.

== Presidency (2016–2024) ==
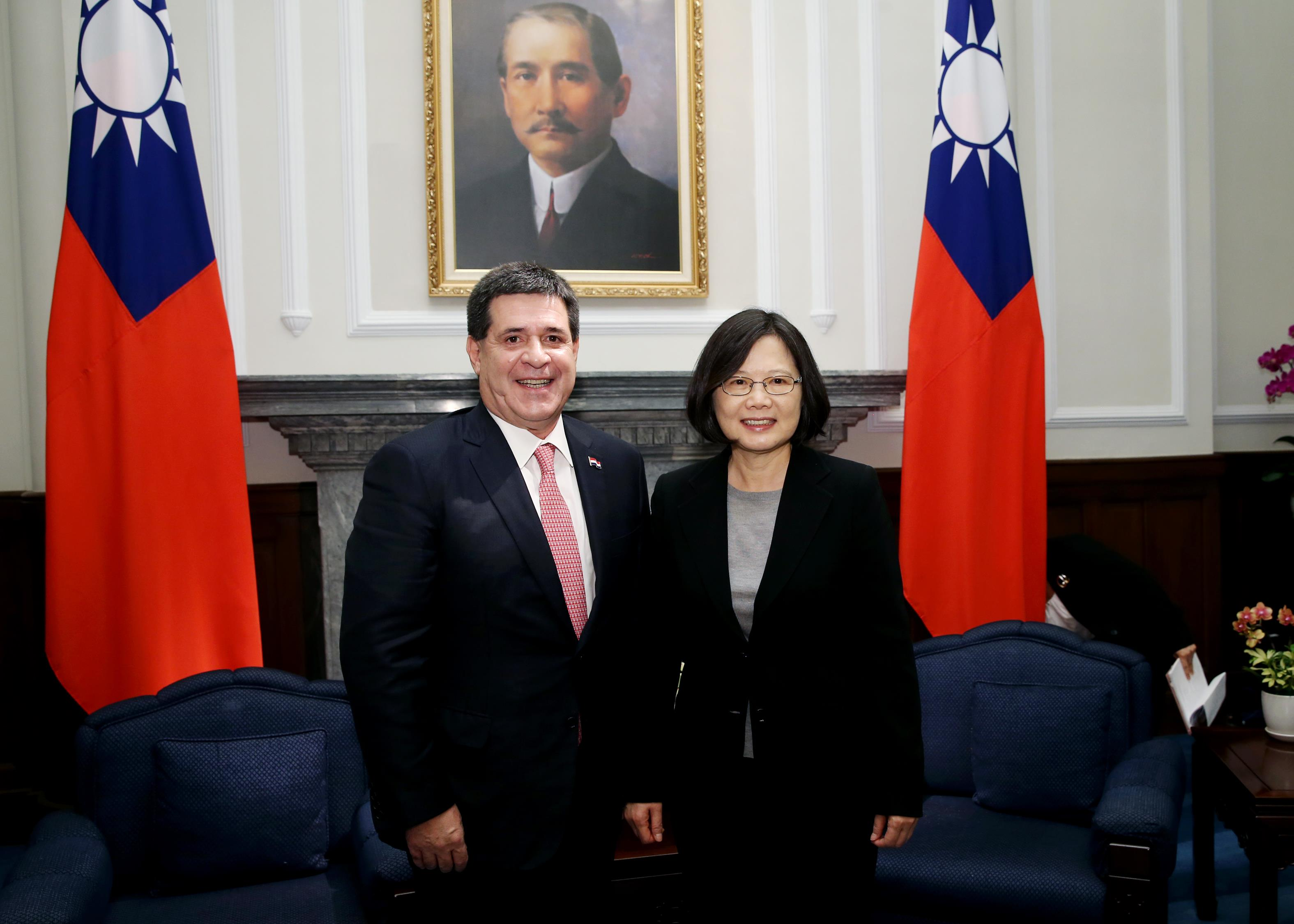
President Tsai and Paraguay's President Horacio Cartes in Taiwan, 20 May 2016

In the inauguration speech for her first term, Tsai stated policy goals such as pension reform, long-term care for the elderly, transitional justice, and judicial reform. She outlined an economic policy of diversification via the New Southbound Policy as well as prioritization of innovative industries. In terms of cross-strait policy, she acknowledged the 1992 Consensus without agreeing to it and called for continued cross-strait dialogue.

In her second inauguration speech, Tsai outlined her major goals in her second term, including instituting a lay judge system, lowering the voting age from 20 to 18, and establishing a human rights commission under the Control Yuan. She also outlined her economic policy, which included transitioning from manufacturing to high-tech industries, with a focus on existing semiconductor and information and communications technology industries, cybersecurity, biotechnology and healthcare, domestic production of military equipment, green energy and strategically-critical industries. She proposed goals for defense reform, including a focus on asymmetric warfare, maintenance of a military reserve force, and reform in management to reflect a democratic society. On cross-strait issues, she explicitly rejected the one country, two systems model proposed by Beijing and expressed a desire for both sides to coexist peacefully.

According to opinion polls, her approval ratings contrasted sharply between low levels in her first term and high levels in her second term. Nevertheless, her approval rating at the end of her term stood at over 50 percent, marking the first such case in Taiwan’s democratic era.

=== Defense policy and indigenous programs ===
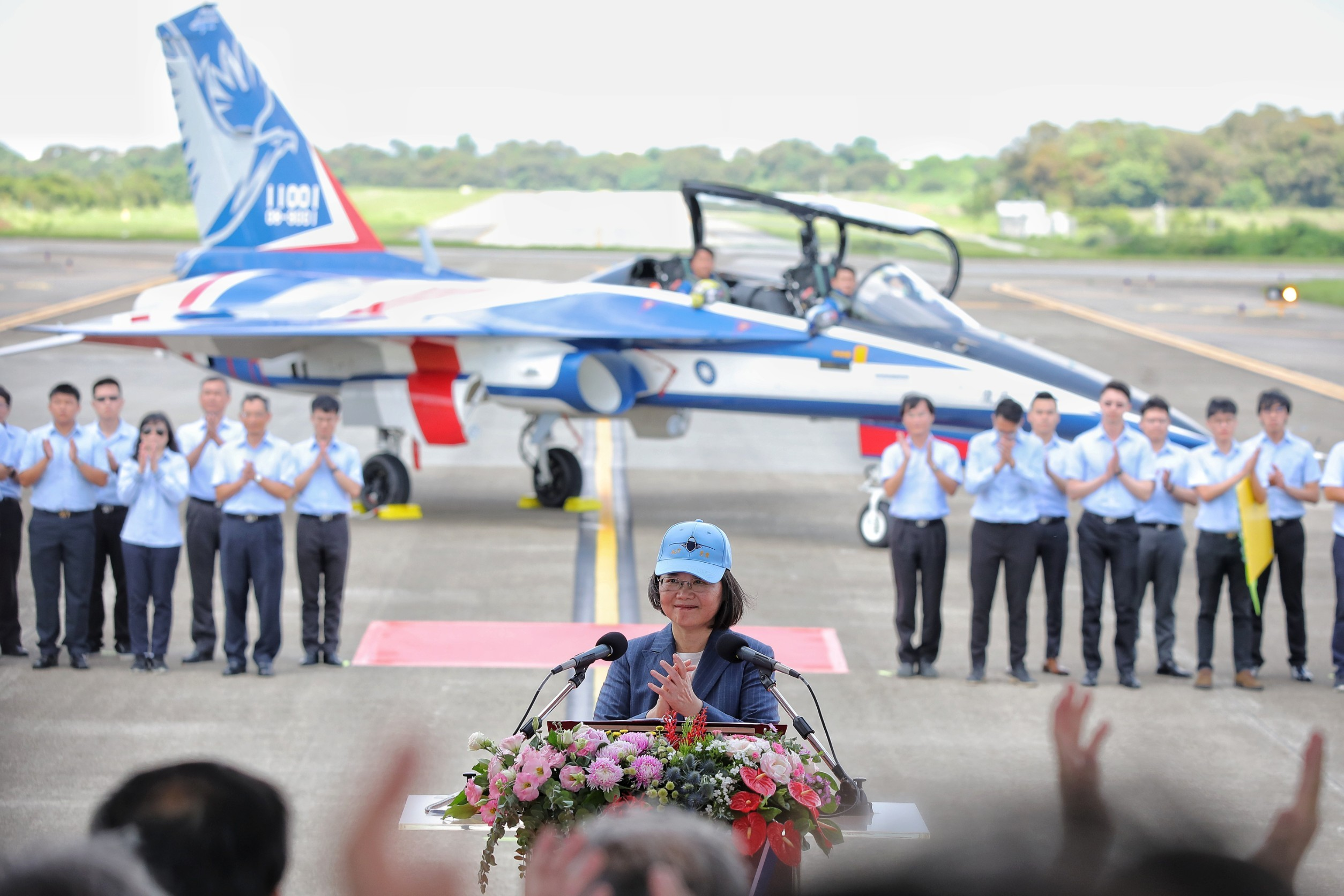
Tsai attends the first flight demonstration of the AIDC T-5 Brave Eagle

During President Tsai's second term, Taiwan increased its military spending as a share of GDP, rising from 2% in 2017–2019 to 2.5% by 2023, with annual defense expenditures reaching NT$600 billion in 2024.

The administration also focused on defensive self-sufficiency and the development of indigenous industries, including submarines and missiles. The AIDC T-5 Brave Eagle indigenous jet trainer, which started development in 2017, successfully conducted its first test flight in 2020. On 29 June 2020, Tsai announced measures to shore up Taiwan's military reserves, including assigning them the same combat gear as active servicemembers and synchronization of mobilization. The first domestically-produced rapid mine-laying ship was delivered on 4 August 2020, and construction on an indigenous diesel submarine began in November 2020. The navy's first indigenous amphibious transport dock was launched on 13 April 2021; named Yu Shan after Taiwan's highest mountain and built by CSBC, it was intended to replace the aging ROCS Hsu Hai (formerly the USS Pensacola).

In December 2022, Tsai announced the extension of compulsory military service from four months to one year, a policy set to take effect in 2024.

=== Diplomatic relations ===
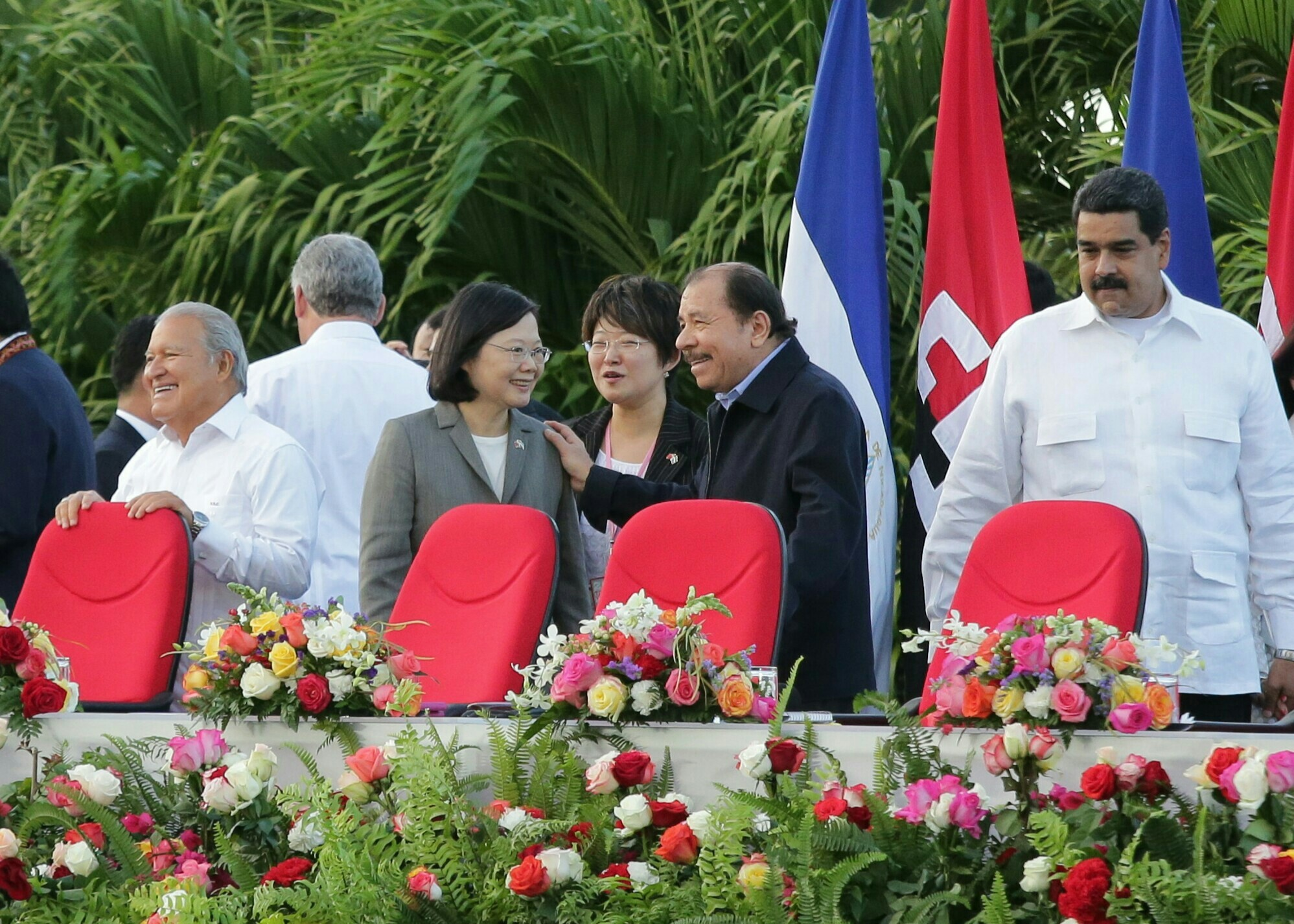
Tsai with Nicaraguan President Daniel Ortega, Venezuelan President Nicolás Maduro and Salvadoran President Salvador Sánchez Cerén in 2017

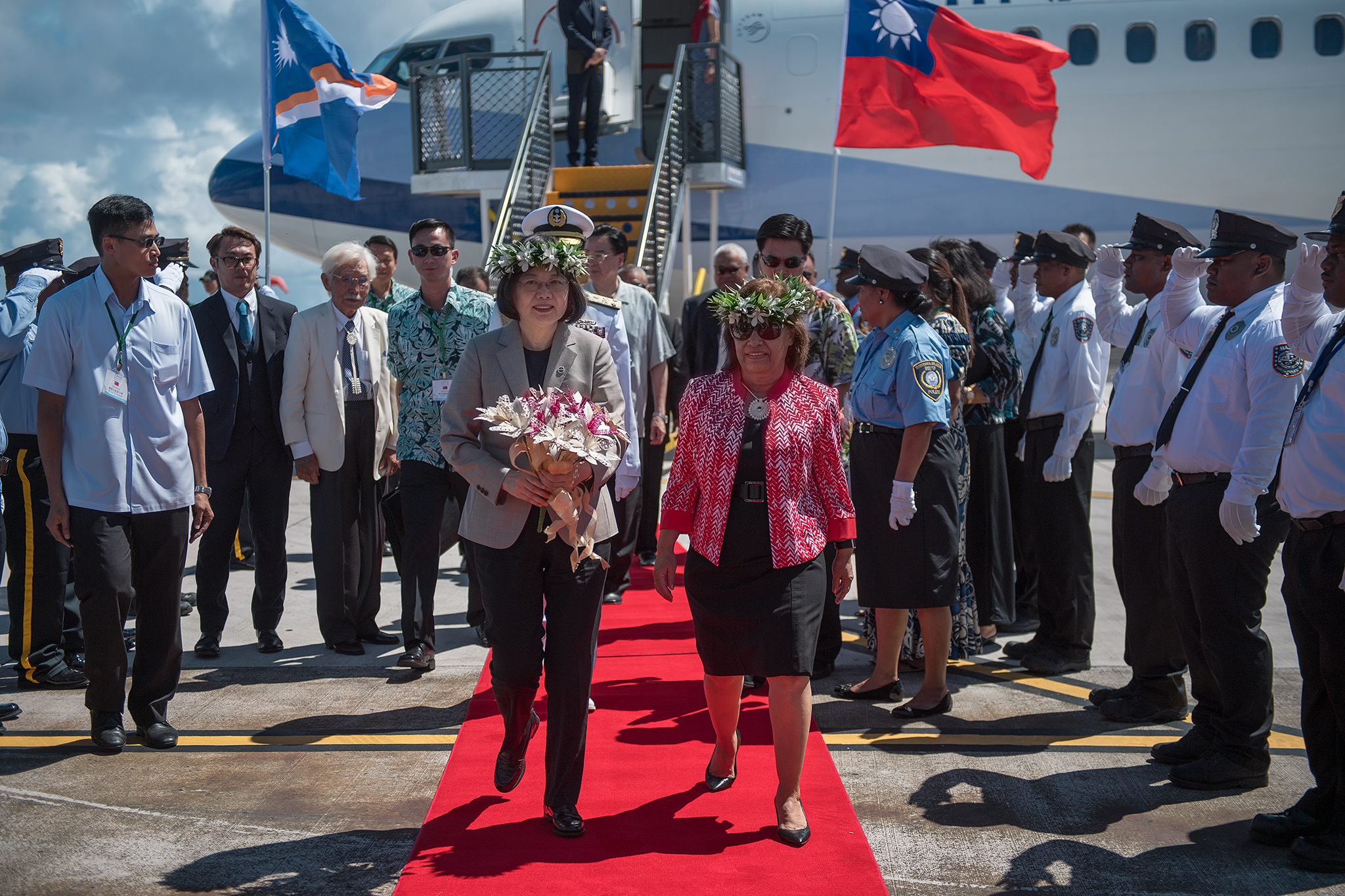
Tsai and Marshall Islands President Hilda Heine in October 2017

Under Tsai, ten countries which had formally recognized the Republic of China (ROC) switched recognition to the People's Republic of China (PRC): São Tomé and Príncipe in 2016; Panama in 2017; the Dominican Republic, Burkina Faso and El Salvador in 2018; the Solomon Islands and Kiribati in 2019; Nicaragua in 2021; Honduras in 2023; and Nauru in 2024. This continued a trend that was temporarily halted under an unofficial "diplomatic truce" during the Ma Ying-jeou administration where the PRC ceased to court official diplomatic allies of the ROC. Since 2017, Taiwan has also been excluded from participating in the World Health Assembly.

At the same time, the Tsai administration saw breakthroughs in Taiwan's unofficial relations with the United States and the European Union. On 9 August 2020, the United States Health and Human Services Secretary Alex Azar of the Trump administration became the highest-level Cabinet member to visit Taiwan since the diplomatic break between the ROC and the United States in 1979. In April 2021, the United States ambassador to Palau made an official visit to Taiwan, the first time a US ambassador had done so since the US switched recognition from the ROC to the PRC in 1979. In the same month, the United States President Joe Biden also sent an official delegation including former senator Chris Dodd to Taiwan.

On November 3, 2021 the first official European Union delegation arrived in Taiwan led by French MEP Raphael Glucksmann, and consisting of Lithuanian MEPs Andrius Kubilius and Petras Auštrevičius, Czech MEP Markéta Gregorová, Austrian MEP Andreas Schieder, Greek MEP Giorgos Kyrtsos and Italian MEP Marco Dreosto, with the purpose of conducting exchanges on disinformation and cyber attacks against democracies. The visit followed an official tour of Central Europe by foreign minister Joseph Wu which included an unofficial visit to Brussels. The Taiwanese Representative Office in Lithuania was inaugurated in November 2021, followed by the establishment of a Lithuanian Trade Representative Office in Taiwan the following year.

On August 2, 2022, U.S. House speaker Nancy Pelosi visited Taiwan with a delegation of 6 Democratic representatives, the first since a visit by Newt Gingrich in 1997, and the highest-profile visit since. The PRC responded with several days of military exercises around Taiwan.

On March 25, 2023, an official delegation of the Chamber of Deputies of the Czech Republic, led by Markéta Pekarová Adamová, visited Taiwan to conduct exchanges on trade, cultural, and academic exchanges.

=== Cross-strait policy ===
During her first inauguration speech, Tsai acknowledged that the talks surrounding the 1992 Summit took place but does not agree that a "consensus" was ever reached by both sides. She credited the talks with spurring 20 years of dialogue and exchange between the two sides. She hoped that exchanges would continue on the basis of these historical facts, as well as the existence of the Republic of China constitutional system and democratic will of the Taiwanese people. In response, Beijing called Tsai's answer an "incomplete test paper" because Tsai did not agree to the content of the 1992 Consensus. On 25 June 2016, Beijing suspended official cross-strait communications, with any remaining cross-strait exchanges thereafter taking place through unofficial channels.

On National Day in 2016, Tsai stated the New Four Noes: "our pledges will not change, and our goodwill will not change; but we will not bow to pressure, and we will of course not revert to the old path of confrontation".

In January 2019, Xi Jinping, the General Secretary of the Chinese Communist Party (CCP), wrote an open letter to Taiwan, proposing a one country, two systems formula for eventual unification. Tsai responded to Xi in a January 2019 speech by stating that Taiwan rejects "one country, two systems" and that because Beijing equates the 1992 Consensus with "one country, two systems", Taiwan rejects the 1992 Consensus as well. During her second inauguration speech, Tsai rejected one country, two systems explicitly again and reaffirmed her previous stance that cross-strait exchanges should be held on the basis of parity between the two sides. She further remarked that cross-strait relations had reached a "historical turning point".

During her 2021 National Day speech, President Tsai rejected the idea of "complete unification of Chinese motherland" through peaceful unification under "One country, two systems" proposed by the Chinese leader Xi Jinping on the 72nd Anniversary of the founding of the People's Republic of China. Tsai stated her commitment to the principle that the Republic of China and the People's Republic of China should not be subordinate to each other.

=== COVID-19 pandemic ===
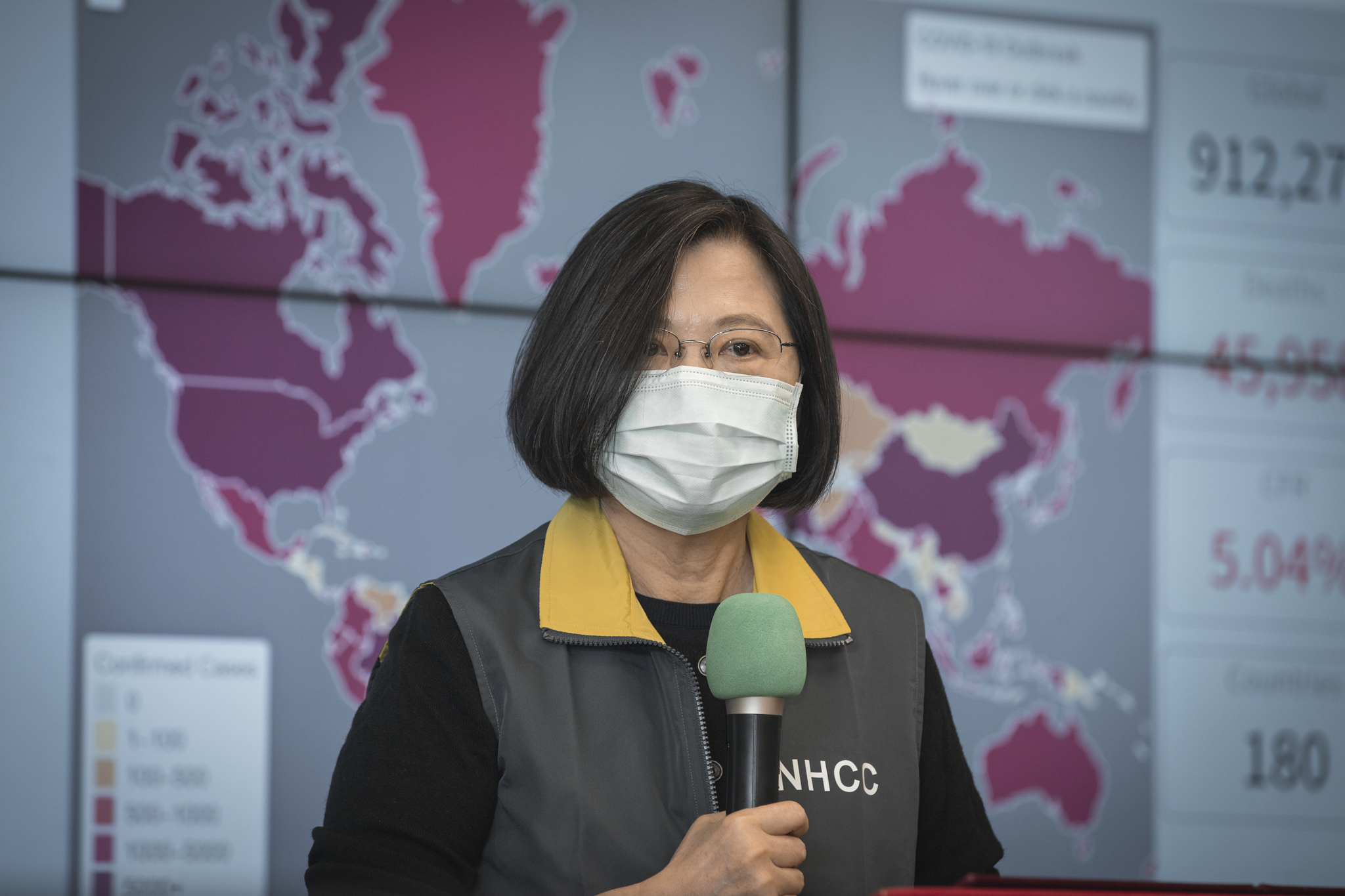
President Tsai during the COVID-19 pandemic in Taiwan

The Tsai administration oversaw Taiwan's response to the COVID-19 pandemic. The Central Epidemic Command Center was activated on January 20, 2020, and deactivated May 1, 2023. The Tsai administration increased domestic mask production during the early stages of the COVID-19 outbreak and later donated masks to other countries.

=== Economy ===
==== Trade relations ====
The New Southbound Policy was launched on 5 September 2016 with the intent to make Taiwan less dependent on Mainland China and to improve Taiwan's cooperation with other countries. The 18 countries the New Southbound Policy targeted for increased cooperation are: Thailand, Indonesia, Philippines, Malaysia, Singapore, Brunei, Vietnam, Myanmar, Cambodia, Laos, India, Pakistan, Bangladesh, Nepal, Sri Lanka, Bhutan, Australia and New Zealand. The policy designated areas of cooperation in trade, technology, agriculture, medicine, education, and tourism. In mid-2019, the Taiwanese government announced that since the implementation of the policy, bilateral trade between Taiwan and the targeted countries increased by 22%, while investment by targeted countries increased by 60%. Further, the number of medical patients from targeted countries increased by 50%, the number of visitors increased by 58%, and the number of students increased by 52%.

On 28 August 2020, the Tsai administration lifted a ban on leaning agent ractopamine, clearing the way for U.S. pork imports and removing a major hurdle for bilateral trade talks between Taiwan and the United States. This move proved controversial domestically, and a referendum to reinstate the ban was defeated in 2021. On 1 June 2022, Taiwan and the United States established a trade negotiation framework titled the U.S.-Taiwan Initiative on 21st-Century Trade. In 2023, an initial trade agreement was signed under this framework, which streamlined customs regulations, established common regulatory practices, and introduced anti-corruption measures, with further measures still in discussion.

==== Energy policy ====
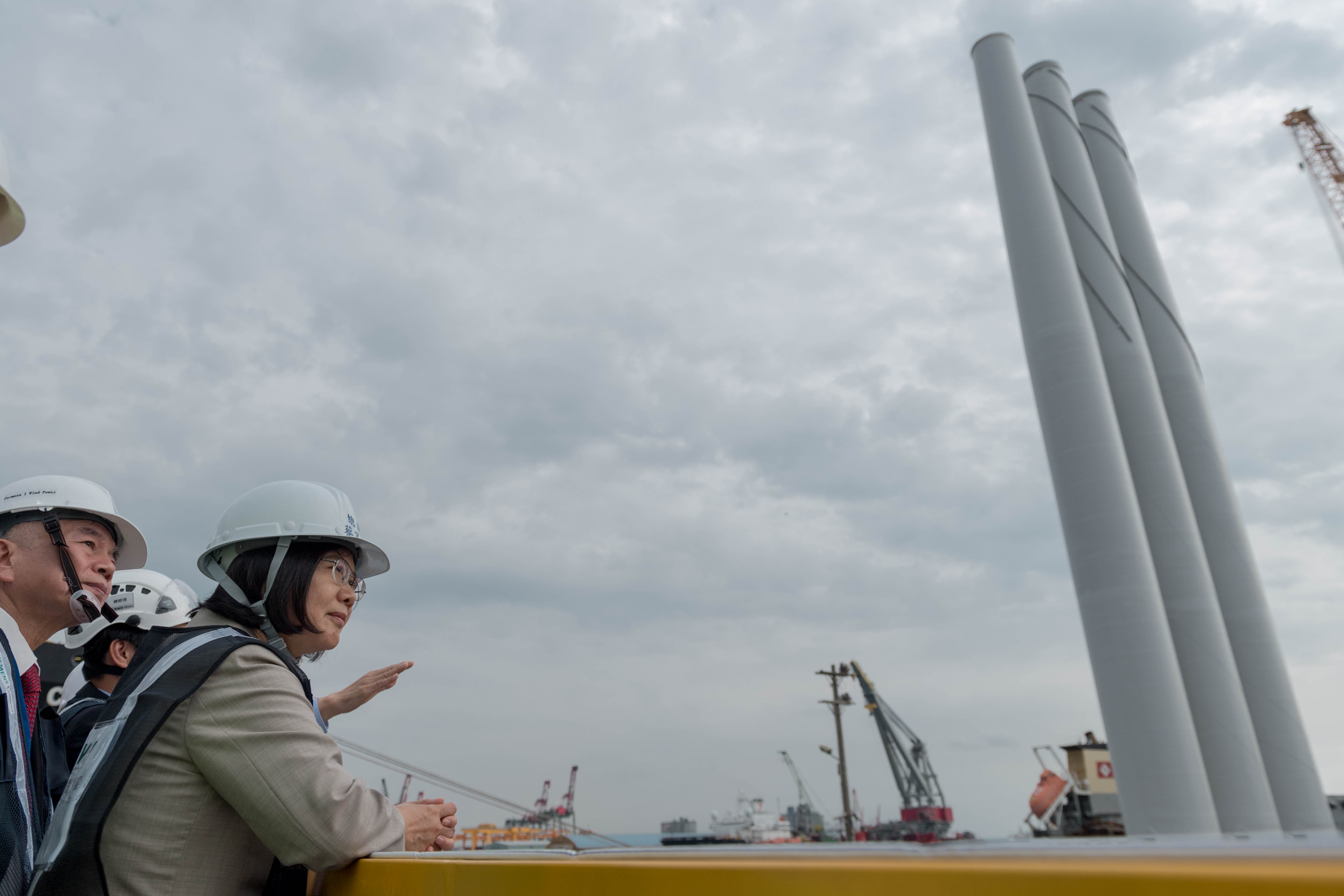
President Tsai visits an offshore wind power demonstration site

The Tsai administration has stated an electricity supply goal of 20% from renewables, 30% from coal and 50% from liquefied natural gas by 2025.

The government approved amendments to the Electricity Act on 20 October 2016 to break up the state-owned monopoly Taipower into subsidiaries and further liberalize the power sector by allowing companies to sell electricity to users directly rather than selling through Taipower. In particular, the generation and distribution divisions of Taipower are to be separated. Amongst the stated motivations for liberalisation was to allow for the direct purchase of green energy by consumers. The plan also included emissions controls, the creation of a regulatory agency, mandatory reserve margins (waived for start-up green energy companies), and measures for price stabilization. The plan was met with protests by Taipower employees.

Tsai campaigned on a promise to make Taiwan nuclear-free by 2025, which was codified into law on 11 January 2017 via amendments to the Electricity Act. An energy blackout due to an unrelated operational mistake have led some to question the nuclear phase-out. According to the results of the 2018 referendum, this provision was abolished on 7 May 2019. Nonetheless, the administration maintained its goal of phasing out nuclear energy. Without renewing the licenses of the three remaining nuclear power plants, which were set to expire after 40 years, the Jinshan Nuclear Power Plant was shut down in July 2019, followed by the decommissioning of the Kuosheng Nuclear Power Plant in March 2023. The final nuclear facility, the Maanshan Nuclear Power Plant, was scheduled to be shut down in May 2025.

Bills under the umbrella of the Forward-Looking Infrastructure initiative were used to fund green energy initiatives. The administration planned to install 1,000 wind turbines on land and offshore and contracted Ørsted of Denmark to install 900 MW of capacity and wpd of Germany to install 1 GW of capacity. Taiwan's first offshore wind farm, Formosa I, consisting of 22 wind turbines expected to produce 128 MW, began operations at the end of 2019. The government also purchased 520 MW of solar capacity in 2017 and more than 1 GW in 2018; total capacity was 2.8 GW at the end of 2018. On 30 May 2023, the Renewable Energy Development Act was amended to require solar panels on all new buildings.

By the end of 2023, the installed capacity of solar photovoltaic power had reached 12.418 GW, while offshore wind power had reached 1.763 GW. Although the government had originally set a target for renewable energy to account for 20% of electricity generation by 2025, projections were later adjusted, with the revised goal set at 15% by 2025 and 20% by November 2026.

==== Forward-looking infrastructure ====
On 5 July 2017, the first Forward-Looking Infrastructure Bill passed the Legislative Yuan. The bill provided $420 billion NTD in funds over a period of 4 years toward infrastructure projects in light-rail infrastructure, water supply infrastructure, flood control measures, and green energy, talent development, urban and rural infrastructure, digital infrastructure and food safety. Other projects include improving road safety and aesthetics, locally oriented industrial parks, recreation centers, bicycle paths, and public service centers for long-term care.

=== Justice ===
==== Transitional justice and judicial reform ====
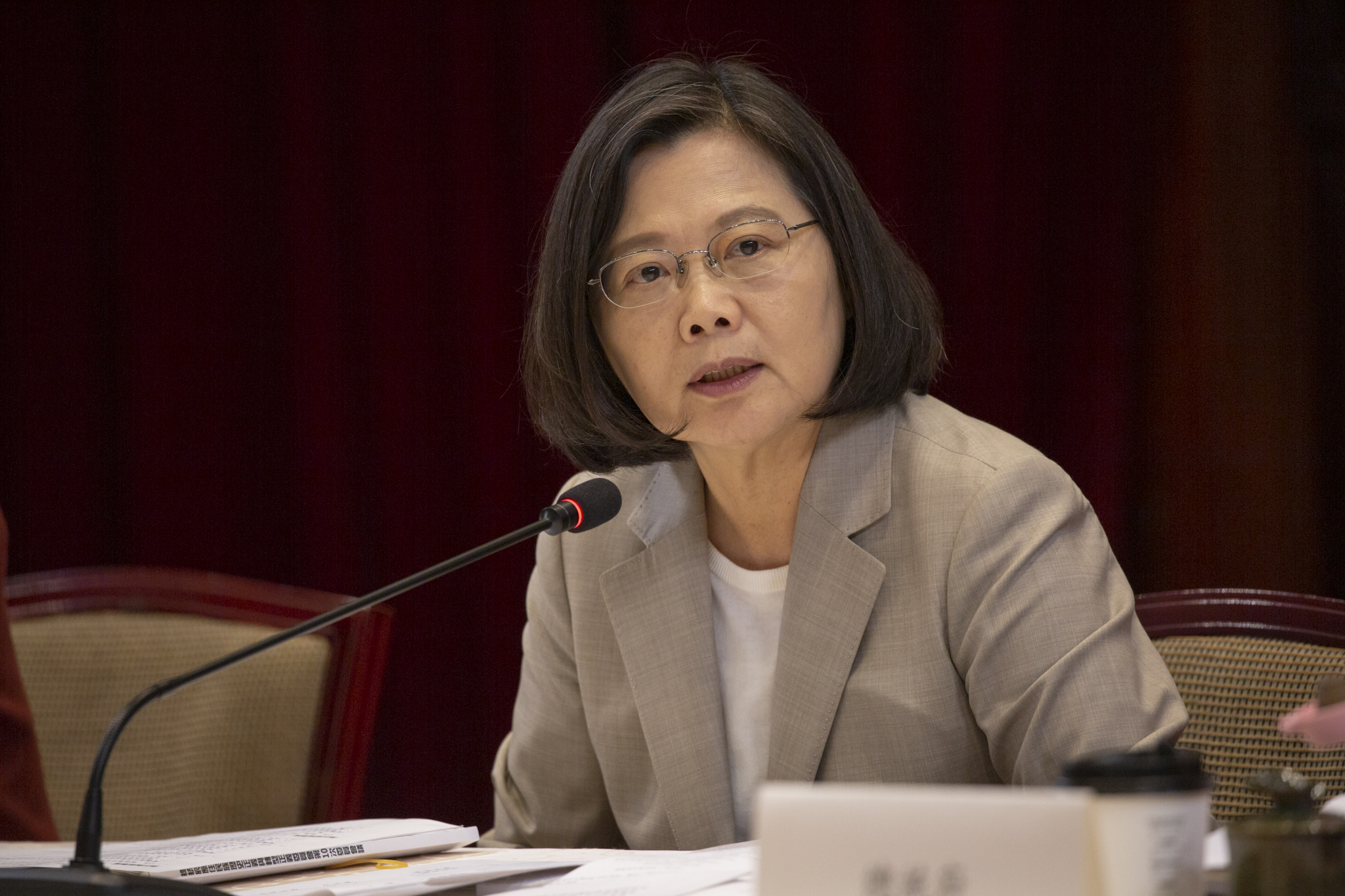
President Tsai at a Transitional Justice Commission meeting

The Act on Promoting Transitional Justice was passed by the Legislative Yuan on 5 December 2017. The act sought to rectify injustices committed by the authoritarian Kuomintang government of the Republic of China on Taiwan, and to this end established the Transitional Justice Commission to investigate actions taken from 15 August 1945, the date of the Hirohito surrender broadcast, to 6 November 1992, when president Lee Teng-hui lifted the Temporary Provisions against the Communist Rebellion for Fuchien Province, Republic of China, ending the period of mobilization. This time period, in particular, includes the February 28 Incident as well as White Terror. The committee's main aims include: making political archives more readily available, removing authoritarian symbols, redressing judicial injustice, and producing a report on the history of the period which delineates steps to further promote transitional justice. During its operation, the commission exonerated political criminals from the martial law era, made recommendations on the removal of authoritarian symbols, and declassified government documents from the martial law era.

The Act Governing the Handling of Ill-gotten Properties by Political Parties and Their Affiliate Organizations was passed in July 2016, and Wellington Koo, one of the main authors of the act, was appointed chairman of the Ill-gotten Party Assets Settlement Committee in August. The stated goal of the act was to investigate state assets which had been illegally transferred to private political parties and their affiliates during the martial law era, and therefore it applied only to political parties officially formed before the end of martial law. This effectively limited its scope to the KMT, which claimed that it had been illegally and unconstitutionally persecuted, arguing that the investigation was a political witch hunt. However, the ruling Democratic Progressive Party (DPP) maintained that the means were necessary for achieving transitional justice and leveling the playing field for all political parties. The committee determined that the China Youth Corps, Central Motion Picture Corporation, National Women's League, and the Broadcasting Corporation of China were KMT-affiliated organizations, and either froze their assets or ordered them to forfeit them.

The KMT reportedly had difficulty paying salaries as its assets were frozen during the investigation. The party challenged the constitutionality of the Ill-gotten Properties Act, asserting that the law deprived the right of citizens to form political parties by depriving those parties of assets needed for their operation. In August 2020, the Constitutional Court ruled that the law was constitutional. In its interpretation, Judicial Yuan secretary-general Lin Hui-Huang wrote that the law was a form of transitional justice and viewed it as a corrective measure for actions during the martial law period which were legal in form but contrary to the principles of constitutional democracy.

The Tsai administration proposed a lay judge system modelled after Japan's over a jury system proposed by the New Power Party. The Citizen Judges Act was passed on 22 July 2020, instituting a lay judge system with three professional judges along with six lay judges. The law took effect on 1 January 2023.

==== Same-sex marriage ====
On 24 May 2017, the Constitutional Court ruled that the constitutional right to equality and freedom of marriage guarantees same-sex couples the right to marry under the Constitution of the Republic of China. The ruling (Judicial Yuan Interpretation No. 748) gave the Legislative Yuan two years to bring the marriage laws into compliance, after which registration of such marriages would come into force automatically. Following the ruling, progress on implementing a same-sex marriage law was slow due to government inaction and strong opposition from some conservative people and Christian groups. In November 2018, the Taiwanese electorate passed referendums to prevent recognition of same-sex marriages in the Civil Code and to restrict teaching about LGBT issues. The Government responded by confirming that the Court's ruling would be implemented and that the referendums could not support laws contrary to the Constitution.

On 20 February 2019, a draft bill entitled the Act for Implementation of J.Y. Interpretation No. 748 (Note: Also translated as the Enforcement Act of Judicial Yuan Interpretation No. 748.) was released. The draft bill would grant same-sex married couples almost all the rights available to heterosexual married couples under the Civil Code, with the exception that it only allows adoption of a child genetically related to one of them. The Executive Yuan passed it the following day, sending it to the Legislative Yuan for fast-tracked review. The bill was passed on 17 May, signed by the President on 22 May and took effect on 24 May 2019 (the last day possible under the Court's ruling).

=== Labor and pension ===
On 1 January 2017, the amended Labor Standards Act, which was passed on 6 December 2016 by the legislature, took effect. The amendments stipulated, with some exceptions, a 40-hour five-day work week with one compulsory rest day and one flexible rest day. On the flexible rest day, workers may work for overtime pay, and the compulsory rest day guaranteed that workers could not work more than six days in a row. The amendments also reduced the number of national holidays from 19 to 12, eliminating Youth Day, Teachers' Day, Retrocession Day, Chiang Kai-shek's birthday, Sun Yat-sen's birthday, Constitution Day and the day following New Year's Day. Prior to the amendments, the Labor Standards Act stipulated a maximum of 84 hours of work in any given 14 day period. The amendments were met with protests from labor groups, who opposed the reduction of national holidays and demanded that work on flexible rest days should result in compensatory vacation days in addition to overtime pay.

After taking effect, the amendments were criticized for their lack of flexibility, resulting in a net decrease in total pay and an increase in cost of living, and for having an overly complicated scheme for calculating overtime pay, leading the administration to further revise the Labor Standards Act. On 1 March 2018, the second revision of the Labor Standards Act came into effect. The revisions relaxed the previous regulations by stipulating two compulsory rest days for each 14 day period rather than one compulsory rest day for each 7 day period, meaning that workers could work for 12 days in a row. The revisions also simplified the formula for overtime pay. The revisions were met with protests and hunger strikes by labor groups.

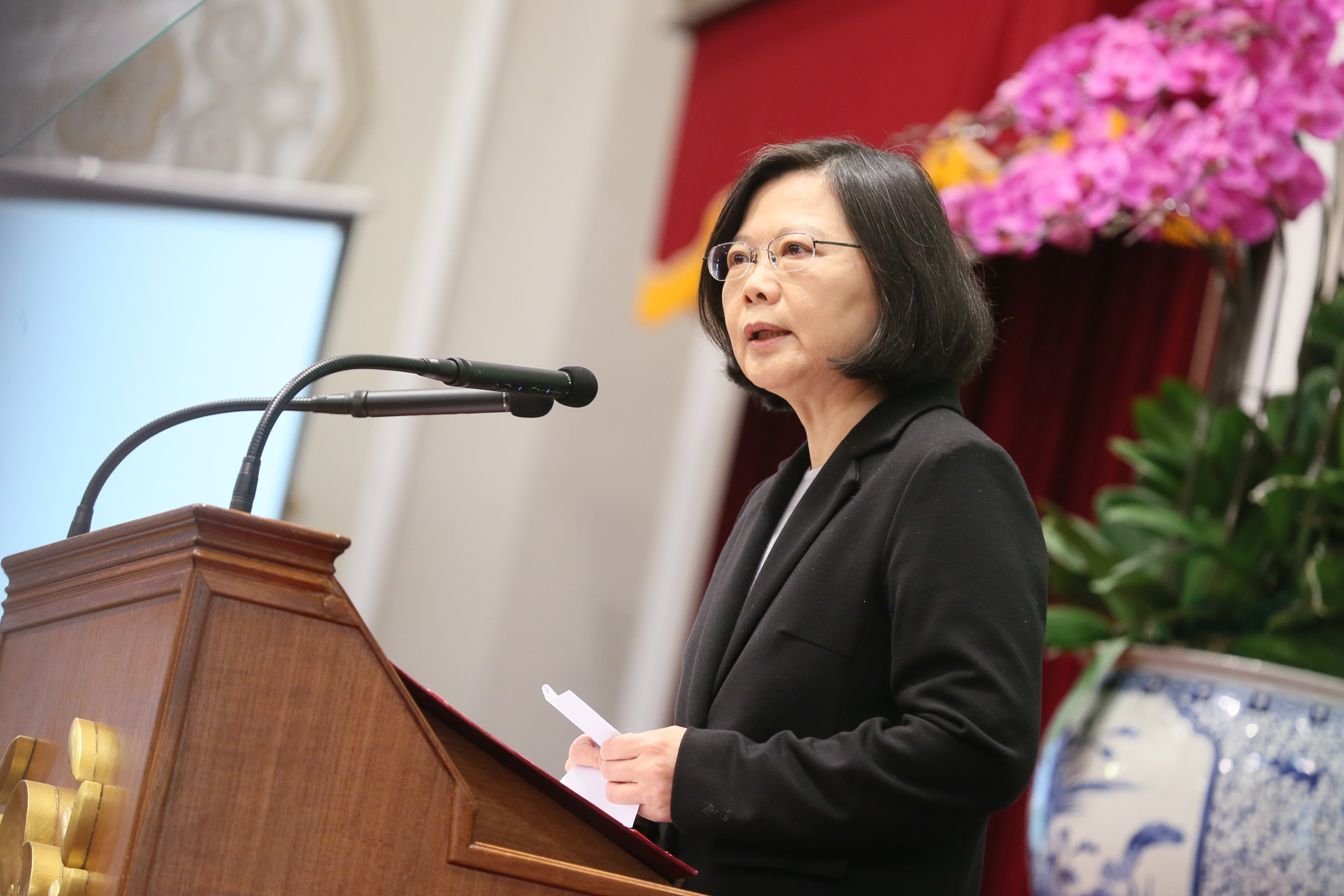
President Tsai attends the opening ceremony of the National Conference on Pension Reform in 2017

International observers had noted that Taiwan's pre-reform pension system was due to default by 2030 for civil servants and by 2020 for the military. Pension reform was passed via two separate bills, one dealing with civil servants and schoolteachers on 27 June 2017 and another dealing with military veterans on 20 June 2018. On 1 July 2018, the pension reforms came into effect. Civil servants, upon retirement, were given a choice between receiving pensions in monthly instalments subject to a preferential interest rate or via a lump sum. Under the reforms, the previous preferential interest rate for those who opted for monthly instalments would be gradually reduced from 18% to 0% over the span of 30 months. Civil servants who opted for a lump sum would see their interest rates decreased from 18% to 6% over a period of 6 years. The reforms were estimated to affect 63,000 military veterans, 130,000 public servants and 140,000 schoolteachers. The reforms simultaneously set minimum monthly pensions for schoolteachers and civil servants at $32,160 NTD and for military veterans at $38,990 NTD. The reforms also raised the minimum retirement age from 55 to 60, with a further increase of 1 year annually until the retirement age reached 65. Though the reforms were met with protests from government retirees and veterans, polls indicated that the majority of Taiwanese are satisfied with the outcome of the pension reforms. After a legal challenge by the KMT, the Constitutional Court found most of the pension reform constitutional, while striking down clauses regarding the suspension of pensions for retirees that took jobs later in the private sector.

=== National languages ===
The Tsai administration took actions to preserve languages facing a crisis of inheritance and to put them on more equal footing to Mandarin. Previously, the only national language was Mandarin; during her administration, the national languages of Taiwan were eventually broadened to include Mandarin, Taiwanese Hokkien, Hakka, 16 indigenous Formosan languages, Taiwanese Sign Language and the Matsu dialect of Eastern Min spoken on the Matsu Islands.

The Indigenous Languages Development Act took effect on 14 June 2017, designating 16 indigenous Formosan languages as national languages. Hakka was made a national language via amendments to the Hakka Basic Act on 29 December 2017. On 25 December 2018, the sweeping National Languages Development Act passed the legislature, creating broadcast services for each national language of Taiwan, providing interpreters for all national languages in the legislature, guaranteeing access to public services in each language (including legislative, and introducing elective language classes in primary schools. The act also directed the government to work with civic groups to create standard orthographies for each national language, and to develop a plan for preserving and revitalizing threatened languages. It furthermore automatically designated, in Article 3, all languages of all ethnic groups in Taiwan as national languages, thus clearing the way for Taiwanese Hokkien, Taiwanese Sign Language, and the Matsu dialect to become national languages.

On 15 August 2019, the government amended the Enforcement Rules of the Passport Act to allow for the use of romanizations of names in any national language (Hakka, Hoklo or indigenous languages) in passports.

== Post-presidency ==
Since leaving office, Tsai has taken on a role as an unofficial diplomat for Taiwan. She has visited countries that strengthened ties during her time as president; in 2025, she visited Lithuania, Denmark, and the United Kingdom.

== Political positions ==
=== United States ===
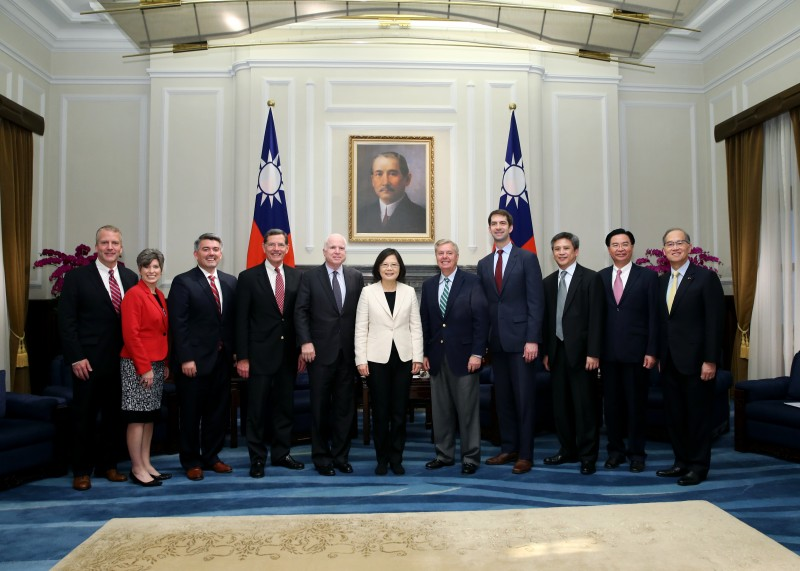
President Tsai (center of image) meets with Republican U.S. Senate delegation led by John McCain, 5 June 2016

Tsai supports strong and stable relationships between Taiwan (ROC) and the United States. In early December 2016, Tsai held an unprecedented telephone call with President-elect Donald Trump. This was the first time that the President of the ROC spoke with the president or president-elect of the United States since 1979. Afterwards, she indicated there had been no major "policy shift". Apart from a three-year pause amidst the coronavirus pandemic, Tsai has visited the U.S. every year as president.

In January 2021, Tsai met with United States Ambassador to the UN Kelly Craft by video link. Craft said: "We discussed the many ways Taiwan is a model for the world, as demonstrated by its success in fighting COVID-19 and all that Taiwan has to offer in the fields of health, technology and cutting-edge science.... the U.S. stands with Taiwan and always will." Chinese Ministry of Foreign Affairs spokesman Zhao Lijian said: "Certain U.S. politicians will pay a heavy price for their wrong words and deeds." On her last day in office later that month, Craft called Taiwan "a force for good on the global stage – a vibrant democracy, a generous humanitarian actor, a responsible actor in the global health community, and a vigorous promoter and defender of human rights."

In March 2023, Tsai traveled to the United States on a 10-day tour of the Americas. The trip comes after Honduras severed ties with Taiwan in order to establish diplomatic relations with China. Tsai will stop in New York before visiting Guatemala and Belize, before heading to Los Angeles before heading back to Taiwan. During the trip, Tsai met Kevin McCarthy in the Ronald Reagan Presidential Library during her stop in Los Angeles. Chinese diplomats threatened a strong response, if senior American politicians, including McCarthy, met with Tsai. Despite China's threat, McCarthy confirmed that he would meet Tsai when she arrived in California. The meeting would also count with the participation of members from the Republican and Democratic parties.

=== Cross-strait relations ===
The DPP's traditional position on the issue of cross-strait relations is that the Republic of China, widely known as Taiwan, is already an independent state governing the territories of Kinmen, Matsu, Penghu Islands, and the island of Taiwan, thus rendering a formal declaration of independence unnecessary. While Tsai has never departed fundamentally from the party line, her personal approach to the issue is nuanced and evolving. Tsai has been described as a Taiwanese nationalist.

During the 2012 presidential election cycle, Tsai said that she disagreed with the 1992 Consensus as the basis for negotiations between Taiwan and mainland China, that such a consensus only served to buttress the "One China Principle", and that "no such consensus exists" because the majority of the Taiwanese public does not necessarily agree with this consensus. She believed that broad consultations should be held at all levels of Taiwanese society to decide the basis on which to advance negotiations with Beijing, dubbed the "Taiwan consensus". During the 2016 election cycle, Tsai was notably more moderate, making "maintaining the status quo" the centerpiece of party policy. She vowed to work within the Republic of China governing framework in addition to preserving the progress made in cross-strait relations by previous governments, while preserving "freedom and democracy" for the residents of Taiwan.

Tsai believes in the importance of economic and trade links with mainland China, but publicly spoke out against the Economic Cooperation Framework Agreement (ECFA), a preferential trade agreement that increased economic links between Taiwan and mainland China. She generally supports the diversification of Taiwan's economic partners.

In response to the death of Chinese Nobel Peace Prize laureate Liu Xiaobo, who died of organ failure while in government custody, Tsai pleaded with the Communist government to "show confidence in engaging in political reform so that the Chinese can enjoy the God-given rights of freedom and democracy".

Tsai has accused the 50 Cent Party of spreading fake news via social media to influence voters and support candidates more sympathetic to Beijing ahead of the 2018 Taiwanese local elections.

In January 2019, Xi Jinping, General Secretary of the Chinese Communist Party (CCP), had announced an open letter to Taiwan proposing a one country, two systems formula for eventual unification. Tsai responded to Xi in a January 2019 speech by stating that Taiwan rejects "one country, two systems" and that because Beijing equates the 1992 Consensus with "one country, two systems", Taiwan rejects the 1992 Consensus as well.

Tsai expressed her solidarity with Hong Kong protesters, remarking that Taiwan's democracy was hard-earned and had to be guarded and renewed. Pledging that as long as she was Taiwan's president, she would never accept "one country, two systems", Tsai cited what she considered to be the constant and rapid deterioration of Hong Kong's democracy over the course of 20 years.

=== Domestic policy ===
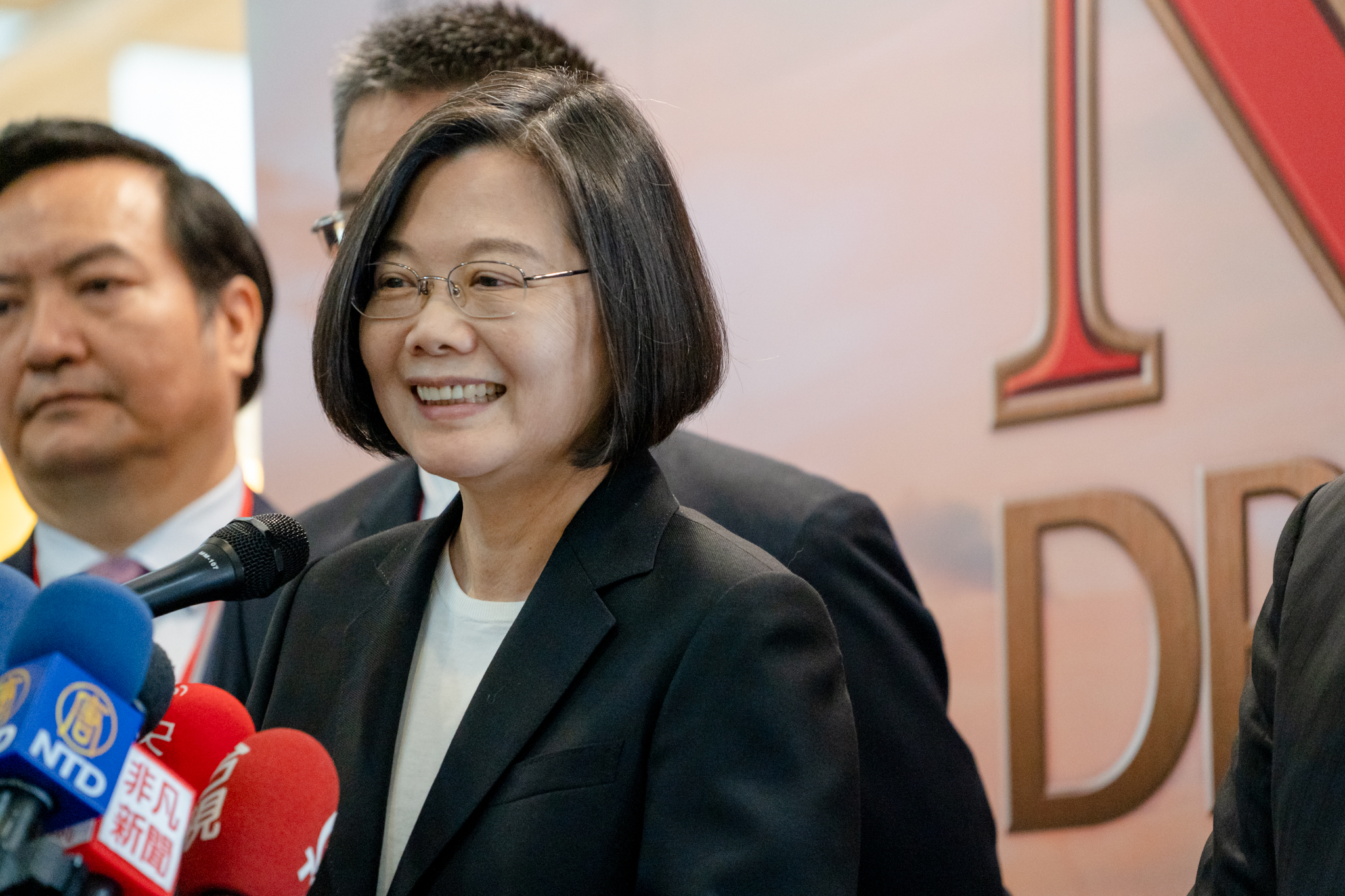
President Tsai attends the 108 Anti-drug Responsible Persons Group in June 2019

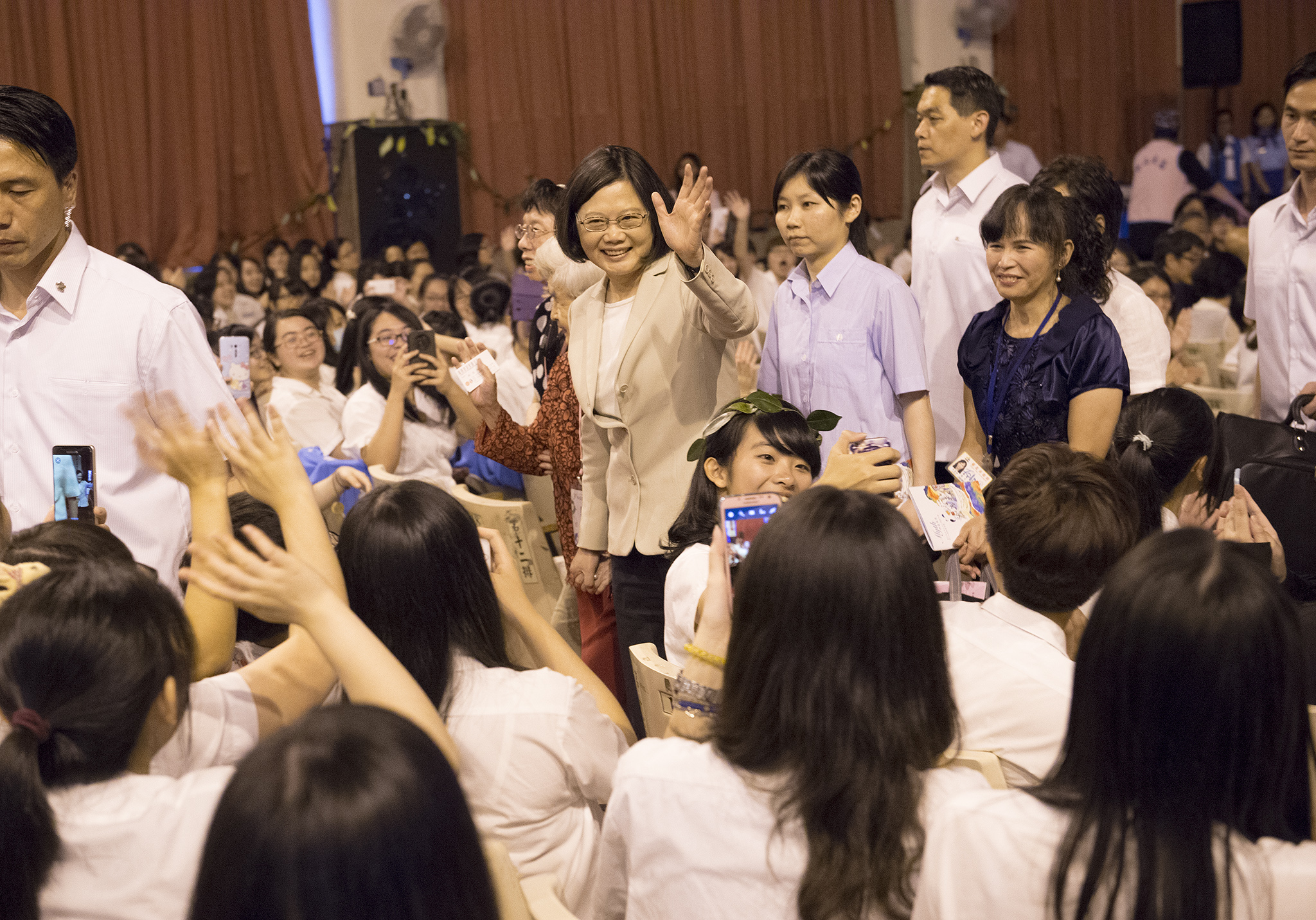
Tsai attends the commencement of her alma mater, Zhongshan Girls High School in Taipei, June 2016

Tsai has traditionally been supportive of disadvantaged groups in society, including the poor, women and children, Taiwanese indigenous peoples, and LGBT groups. She favours government action to reduce unemployment, introducing incentives for entrepreneurship among youth, expanding public housing, and government-mandated childcare support. She supports government transparency and more prudent and disciplined fiscal management.

Tsai advocated for the non-partisanship of the president of the Legislative Yuan, the increase in the number of "at-large" seats in the legislature, the broadening of participation among all political parties and interest groups. She supports proactively repairing the damage done to Taiwanese aboriginal groups, as well as the government actions in the February 28 Incident and during the phase of White Terror. She has also called for the de-polarization of Taiwanese politics, and advocates for a more open and consensus-based approach to addressing issues and passing legislation.

Tsai also has beliefs intertwined with social liberalism.

=== LGBT rights ===
Tsai supports LGBT rights and has endorsed the legalization of same-sex marriage in Taiwan. On 21 August 2015, the day of the Double Seventh Festival, she released a campaign video in which three same-sex couples actors appeared. On 31 October 2015, when the biggest gay pride parade in Asia was held in Taipei, Tsai expressed her support for same-sex marriage. She posted a 15-second video on her Facebook page saying "I am Tsai Ing-wen, and I support marriage equality" and "Let everyone be able to freely love and pursue happiness". During her presidency, Tsai advocated for the legalization of same-sex marriage, despite opposition from ultra conservative religious groups. After the 2018 Taiwanese referendum, Tsai led the government to legalize same-sex marriage outside of the Civil Code, making Taiwan the first country in Asia to legalize marriage equality.

== Personal life and family ==
Tsai's paternal grandfather came from a prominent Hakka family in Fangshan, Pingtung. Her grandmother, from Shizi, Pingtung, was of aboriginal Paiwan descent. Tsai's father, Tsai Chieh-sheng (蔡潔生; Cài Jiéshēng) owned a car repair business. Tsai's mother is Chang Chin-fong (張金鳳; Zhāng Jīnfèng), the last of her father's four wives. Tsai is the youngest of her parents' four children. She also has seven elder half-siblings on her father's side and a half-brother on her mother's side. She is the first Taiwanese president of aboriginal descent, and the second of Hakka descent after Lee Teng-hui.

Tsai is unmarried and has no children, making her Taiwan's first unmarried president. According to traditional Chinese genealogical naming practices, Tsai's name should have been 蔡瀛文, since her generation name is 瀛 (yíng), not 英 (yīng). However, Tsai's father believed the former to have too many strokes for her to learn, so she was instead named 英文, which can be literally translated by its individual parts as "heroic" and "literature". The word 英文 is coincidentally also the Chinese name for the English language (which Tsai speaks) as yīng is also used as a phonetic approximation of the first syllable of "England". Tsai also bears the Paiwan name Tjuku.

Tsai is known to be a cat lover, and her two cats, "Think Think" and "Ah Tsai", featured prominently in her election campaign. In October 2016, she adopted three retired guide dogs, named Bella, Bunny, and Maru.

== Honours ==
Tsai was named one of Time's most influential people of 2020 and was ranked ninth on Forbes's most powerful women in 2021, being the second-highest ranking female politician after Kamala Harris (who placed second in the list, behind philanthropist MacKenzie Scott). Internationally, Tsai has been praised for her response to the COVID-19 pandemic, and for standing up to pressure from the People's Republic of China.

She has received:

- Belize:
  - Order of Belize (2018)
- El Salvador:
  - Grand Cross with Gold Star of the National Order of Doctor José Matías Delgado (2017)
- Eswatini:
  - Collar of the Order of the Elephant (2018)
- Guatemala:
  - Grand Collar of the Order of the Quetzal (2017)
  - Grand Cross with Gold Star of the Order of the Five Volcanoes (2023)
  - Peace Ambassador
- Haiti:
  - Grand Cross of the National Order of Honour and Merit (2018)
- Honduras:
  - Grand Cross with Gold Star of the Order of Francisco Morazán (2016)
- Paraguay:
  - Grand Collar of the National Order of Merit (2016)
- Saint Kitts and Nevis
  - Order of St Christopher and Nevis (2019)

== Notes ==
Political offices
Preceded by Su Chi	Minister of the Mainland Affairs Council; 2000–2004	Succeeded by Joseph Wu
Preceded by Wu Rong-i	Vice Premier of the Republic of China; 2006–2007	Succeeded by Chiou I-jen
Preceded by Ma Ying-jeou	President of the Republic of China; 2016–2024	Succeeded by Lai Ching-te
Party political offices
Preceded by Frank Hsieh; Acting	Leader of the Democratic Progressive Party; 2008–2011	Succeeded by Ker Chien-ming; Acting
Preceded by Ker Chien-ming; Acting	Leader of the Democratic Progressive Party; 2011–2012	Succeeded by Chen Chu; Acting
Preceded by Frank Hsieh	DPP nominee for President of the Republic of China; 2012, 2016, 2020	Succeeded by Lai Ching-te
Preceded by Su Tseng-chang	Leader of the Democratic Progressive Party; 2014–2018	Succeeded by Lin Yu-chang; Acting
Preceded by Cho Jung-tai	Leader of the Democratic Progressive Party; 2020–2022	Succeeded by Chen Chi-mai as Acting chair
