= Dang Guo =

One-party system used by the Kuomintang (1924–1987)

Flag of the Kuomintang

Flag of the Republic of China

Dang Guo (Chinese: 黨國; pinyin: Dǎngguó; Wade–Giles: Tang^{3}kuo^{2}; lit. 'party-state'), also known as Tang Kuo, was the one-party system adopted by the Republic of China (ROC) under the Kuomintang, lasting from 1924 to 1987. It was adopted after Sun Yat-sen acknowledged the efficacy of the nascent Soviet Union's political system, including its system of dictatorship, however in practice it also borrowed from fascism. Chiang Kai-shek later used the Kuomintang to control and operate the Nationalist government and the National Revolutionary Army. All major national policies of the government bureaucracy were formulated by the Kuomintang, giving the party supreme power over the whole nation, as well as ideological supremacy across China, dominating the Chinese political landscape until the rise of Chinese Communist Party.

Following the beliefs of Sun Yat-sen, political power should have been returned to the people after the National Revolutionary Army militarily ended the Warlord Era. However, martial law in Taiwan continued from 1949 until 1987, during which other political parties were banned. Martial law was lifted in 1987 by president Chiang Ching-kuo, a move that legalized other political parties such as the Democratic Progressive Party and ended the Dang Guo era.

== Origin ==
Dang Guo was short for Yi Dang Zhi Guo (以黨治國), which literally means "using the political party to run the state". In 1920, Sun Yat-sen, founding father of the Republic of China, made Dang Guo the official ROC national policy during the phase of military rule and political tutelage (two of the three phases of the Fundamentals of National Reconstruction). He was influenced by Leninist ideology, which led to the October Revolution in Russia. According to Sun, the Kuomintang should be paramount over the Republic of China in the course of revolution (war against the warlords) and should issue orders to the ROC bureaucracy, all NGO groups, and indeed to all individuals.

In 1924, Sun said regarding state-building:

當俄革命時，用獨裁政治，諸事均一切不顧，只求革命成功……，其能成功，即因其將黨放在國上。我以為今日是一大紀念日，應重新組織，把黨放在國上。
Dāng é gémìng shí, yòng dúcái zhèngzhì, zhūshì jūn yīqiè bùgù, zhǐ qiú gémìng chénggōng ..., Qí néng chénggōng, jí yīn qí jiāng dǎng fàng zài guó shàng. Wǒ yǐwèi jīnrì shì yī dà jìniànrì. Yīng chóngxīn zǔzhī, bǎ dǎng fàng zài guó shàng.
When the Russian Revolution took place, it (the Bolsheviks) adopted a dictatorship, disregarding everything else and focusing solely on achieving revolutionary success... Its success lay in placing the party above the nation. I believe today is a great day of remembrance—we should reorganize and place the party (Kuomintang) above the nation (ROC).

== In practice ==
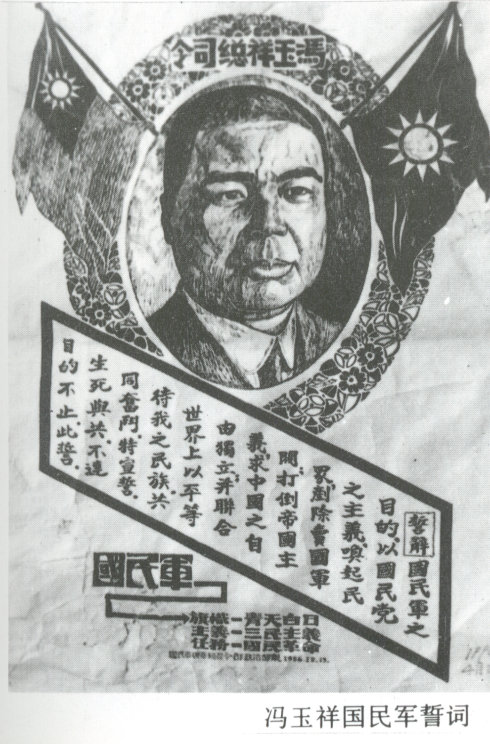
Blue Sky with a White Sun flag above the oath of Guominjun

After Sun Yat-sen decided to follow and copy the Soviet political system, his successor Chiang Kai-shek used the Kuomintang to control and operate both the Nationalist government and the National Revolutionary Army, which was sometimes called "The Party's Army" (黨軍). The ROC bureaucracy had then become the means and the tools of Kuomintang, where all the major national policies were formulated, while resulted in the party holding the supreme power of the whole nation.

The concept of Dang Guo was an outgrowth of Sun's concept of "political tutelage" during which the Kuomintang was to lead the state and to instruct the people on how the democratic system would work prior to the transition to full democracy.

Under Dang Guo, ROC military personnel and civil servants alike were expected to owe their allegiance to Kuomintang first and the state second, a policy reflected by such phrases as "Service to the Party and the Nation" (功在黨國) and in the national anthem, which makes an explicit reference to "Our Party". Likewise, the emblem of the Kuomintang was used as the emblem of the state, and the flag of the Kuomintang has been used as the naval jack to this day. The Kuomintang sought to build a one-party ideological state, which had some influence from fascist ideology.

The Kuomintang unified China in 1927 and started to prepare the state for political reform, as according to Sun's teaching. The Constitution of the Republic of China, enacted in 1947, stipulates that different parties shall enjoy equal status, and the National Revolutionary Army was returned to civilian control as the Army of the Republic of China. However, the outbreak of the Chinese Civil War caused the ROC to be under military rule of the KMT during the period of mobilization when the ROC government relocated to Taiwan in 1949.

In October 1926, the KMT Central Committee resolved three possible arrangements to define the relationship between provincial party headquarters and provincial governments: provincial governments would either operate under the guidance of the provincial party headquarters; under the joint guidance of special political commissioners and the provincial party headquarters; or cooperate with the provincial party headquarters on an equal basis. The specific arrangement for each province was to be determined by the Central Executive Committee.

As the Chinese Communist Party gained growing influence within grassroots KMT organizations, the Nationalist government became increasingly alarmed at the rise of local party power. Following the "party purge" of 1927, widespread purges and reorganizations of local party headquarters not only caused party activities to stagnate, but also led to a marked decline of party authority and left the relationship between local party organs and local governments ambiguously defined.

After the loss in Chinese civil war, the Kuomintang launch the Party Reform Program to introduced personnel rotation mechanisms such as "functional rotation," "regional rotation," "vertical rotation between senior and junior posts," and "domestic–overseas rotation" as methods intended to restrain the development of intra-party factions and practice Dang Guo. Although these measures could not eliminate factionalism, the Kuomintang, through its early post-relocation reforms in Taiwan, established organizational principles described as those of a "revolutionary democratic party," in which organizational decisions were prioritized, leaders were expected to act in accordance with collective resolutions, and cadres were required to implement the will of the leadership. On this institutional basis, Chiang Kai-shek's authority within the Kuomintang was reported to have become less constrained by factional politics than during the mainland period.

Following successive rounds of organizational consolidation, by the early 1950s the Kuomintang had consolidated control over political power in Taiwan and was able to redirect attention toward strengthening its grassroots institutional foundations. This development has been described in the historiography as a significant transformation in the Kuomintang's party–state system. During the mainland period, weak lower-level organizational capacity and the absence of effective grassroots party structures had constituted major structural limitations. Local political forces often exercised autonomous power, and party personnel dispatched by the central leadership reportedly encountered resistance and pressure, limiting the party's local presence and organizational expansion.

By contrast, in the Taiwan period after the reforms, appointments of provincial party directors and secretaries-general reportedly required personal interviews with Chiang Kai-shek, while county and municipal party branches evolved from primarily administrative relay units into actors involved in the allocation of local political power. In this respect, Kuomintang local party operations in Taiwan have been widely regarded as substantially different from those of the mainland period.

At the same time, a substantial proportion of mid- and high-ranking cadres in the early period consisted of members with longer party tenure who were predominantly from outside Taiwan. This relative underrepresentation of native Taiwanese party members constrained the deepening of local organizational penetration. Nevertheless, the government of the Republic of China succeeded in establishing a system of lower-level power structures through which state institutions distributed and controlled political and economic resources, rewarding loyalty among both Taiwanese and mainland-origin officials.

In parallel, the Kuomintang expanded neighborhood-level organizations, including the establishment of "public service stations" (民眾服務站), and carried out the reorganization of farmers’, fisheries’, and irrigation associations. It also developed electoral nomination and mobilization mechanisms, and utilized forms of economic privilege as instruments for cultivating local political support.

After martial law ended in 1987, all political parties became legal, and the Republic of China was democratized. Since then, the president of the Republic of China has been democratically elected by the people of Taiwan. In 2000, Chen Shui-bian of the Democratic Progressive Party was elected as the first non-KMT president under the Constitution.

== Scholarly assessment ==
The concept of the Dang Guo in the Republic of China developed with the KMT's reorganization during the First National Congress in 1924, when Sun Yat-sen established the principle of “party-state tutelage” as the basis of national governance. In 1931, historian Prof. Li Jiannong of Wuhan University argued that Sun's action in 1924 marked the beginning of a new political order in China, in which political legitimacy would derive from party authority rather than constitutional law. He summarized the shift as a transition from “rule of law” to “rule of the party,” and from defending constitutionalism to defending the party itself.

Both the KMT and the Chinese Communist Party initially adopted their party-state frameworks from the Soviet model, wherein local party committees were intended to serve as the highest decision-making bodies and control state administration through cadre appointments. However, divergence soon emerged. The KMT's 1927 purge weakened party institutions while empowering the military, resulting in a persistent imbalance between political and party authority. Despite the formal doctrine of “supremacy of party power,” party organizations struggled to exert effective control over state and military institutions.

Studies of KMT governance during the period of political tutelage indicate that the party-state structure suffered from unclear functional divisions between party and government. He Zhiming, associate professor at Sichuan University, found in his study of the Jiangsu–Zhejiang party apparatus—the key locus of KMT governance during the tutelage period—that between 1928 and 1931, repeated attempts by local party organizations to strengthen their authority all failed. He attributed this to the central government's unclear definition of grassroots party roles. Rather than adhering to the Leninist principle of “the party above the state,” local party organs were instead treated as supervisory bodies akin to those under parliamentary government. He writes: “Within the KMT, the positions taken by the central and local party departments were each based on their own interests. For the party center, although it had its own understanding of ‘strengthening party power’—such as believing that ‘party power above all means the central party’s power above all’—it was unwilling for the party to stand above the government at the local level.” As a result, when confronted by challenges from local governments, grassroots party organizations often received no support from the KMT's central leadership.

== See also ==
- Chinese state nationalism
- Democratic centralism (Kuomintang)
- Neoauthoritarianism
- Particracy
- Party-state capitalism
- The Party leads everything
- Transitional Justice Commission
- Wild Strawberry student movement
