= Yeh Hung-ling =

Taiwanese activist and politician

- 葉虹靈

Acting Chairperson of the Transitional Justice Commission of the Republic of China
- In office 31 May 2021 – 30 May 2022
- Preceded by: Yang Tsui
- Succeeded by: office disestablished

Personal details
- Party: Social Democratic Party

Yeh Hung-ling (Chinese: 葉虹靈) is a Taiwanese activist and politician.

Yeh served the Taiwan Association for Truth and Reconciliation (TATR) as executive secretary and chief executive. While she was affiliated with the organization, Yeh's views on the February 28 Incident, transitional justice, and Lung Ying-tai were published in the Taipei Times. By 2016, Yeh had left her position at TATR, but continued advocating for victims of the February 28 Incident and their families.

After the Social Democratic Party was founded in 2015, Yeh became the party's secretary-general.

On 7 April 2018, Yeh was nominated to serve on the Transitional Justice Commission. In materials submitted to the Legislative Yuan, Yeh opined that the primary focus on the committee should not be on handling authoritarian symbols, but on uncovering the truth and determining accountability. Her nomination was confirmed by the Legislative Yuan in May 2018. Yeh became the commission's spokesperson.

After the legislature voted to extend the term of the commission, Yeh's reappointment was confirmed in May 2020. Yeh was additionally elevated to vice chairwoman of the commission. When Yang Tsui resigned as chair of the Transitional Justice Commission, Yeh was named acting chair. In this position, Yeh commented on the possible removal of the Chiang Kai-shek statue at Chiang Kai-shek Memorial Hall, discussed the commission's research into the Dang Guo system, and remarked on the commission's finding that Chiang Ching-kuo was an authoritarian figure, and the Ching-kuo Chi-hai Cultural Park was an authoritarian symbol. She remained the commission's acting leader until May 2022, when its final report was published.
