= 2017–2018 Taiwanese tax reform protests =

2018 tax reform protests in Taiwan

The 2017-2018 Taiwanese protests was demonstrations and popular protests held throughout Taiwan, mainly in its capital city, Taipei, as part of two waves of massive and violent demonstrations, in 2017, a wave of protests against a new pension reform was dispersed by Riot police as the Taiwanese yellow vests movement was protest campaigns against various new taxing and working laws in December 2018, mainly directed at president Tsai Ing-wen.

Demonstrations first broke out after police fired tear gas at hundreds of protesters in January 2017, mainly retirees and military veterans, protesting new pension bills and new reform programs. Protesters rallied in Taipei outside the Legislative Yuan or presidential office in February, on the anniversary of the February 28 incident. Thousands participated in the next few days and next couple of weeks in nonviolent protest rallies.

A lot of chants and episodes of violence during the anti-reform and anti-China protests was recorded, like Down with independence (anti-independence) and Reverse the reforms. After the wave of protests, the government ignored the demands and the protests, soon surpassing the new reform in parliament (Legislative Yuan).

Thousands participated in an unprecedented wave of mass protests and demonstrations in support of the Yellow vests movement ongoing in France against a new taxing law, threatening workers. Huge crowds with yellow vests nodded and used chants to demand the withdrawal of the new taxing; however, similar to the last time, the government ignored the demands and the bites succeeded in parliament. Their main demands were fair handling of tax disputes and lower taxes.

== See also ==
- Sunflower Student Movement
