= Huang Huang-hsiung =

Taiwanese politician (born 1944)

Huang Huang-hsiung MLY
- 黃煌雄
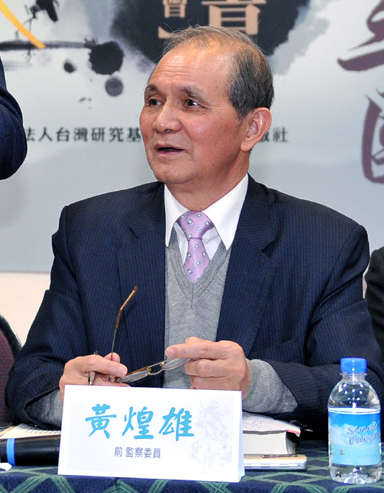
- Huang in March 2015

Chairperson of the Transitional Justice Commission of the Republic of China
- In office 31 May 2018 – 6 October 2018
- Deputy: Chang Tien-chin
- Preceded by: Office established
- Succeeded by: Yang Tsui

Member of the Control Yuan
- In office 1 August 2008 – 31 July 2014
- In office 1 February 1999 – 31 January 2005

Member of the National Assembly
- In office 1 February 1992 – 31 January 1993

Member of the Legislative Yuan
- In office 1 February 1993 – 31 January 1996
- Constituency: Taipei County
- In office 1 February 1987 – 31 January 1990
- Constituency: Taipei County
- In office 1 February 1981 – 31 January 1984
- Constituency: Taipei County

Personal details
- Born: 15 September 1944 (age 81) Taihoku Prefecture, Japanese Taiwan
- Party: Democratic Progressive Party
- Education: National Taiwan University (BA, MA)

Huang Huang-hsiung (Chinese: 黃煌雄; born 15 September 1944) is a Taiwanese politician.

== Education ==
Huang graduated from National Taiwan University with a bachelor's degree in political science in 1967 and a master's degree in political science in 1971. From 1996 to 1998, he was a visiting scholar at Harvard University in the United States. He later worked as a lawyer.

== Political career ==
Huang was first elected to the first Legislative Yuan in 1980, only to lose reelection in 1983. He won in the next election cycle, 1986, and served until 1990. Huang then ran in the National Assembly elections of December 1991, and sat in the assembly until 1993 when he returned to the Legislative Yuan. He left the Legislative Yuan in 1996 after losing reelection and was appointed to the Control Yuan by President Lee Teng-hui in 1999. In his first Control Yuan stint, Huang began investigating the assets of the Kuomintang. The inquiry lasted fourteen years, by which time Huang had been nominated for a second term on the Control Yuan by Ma Ying-jeou. Huang did not receive a third nomination, and stepped down from the Control Yuan in July 2014.

Besides his long-running inquiry into the Kuomintang, undertaken during his first Control Yuan term, Huang also looked into the status of social welfare in Taiwan, and the actions of the Ministries of Justice and Finance in regards to financial crime prevention. He and fellow Control Yuan member Ma Yi-kung were credited with persuading the government to rebuild the Wufeng Lin Family Mansion and Garden, which had been damaged in the 1999 Jiji earthquake. Huang next served on the Control Yuan starting in 2008. After an October visit to Taiwan by Association for Relations Across the Taiwan Strait chairman Chen Yunlin, he launched an inquest into allegations of civil liberties violations by the National Police Agency and National Security Bureau while providing security for the visit. An investigation into corruption headed by Huang and Chien Lin Hui-chun ended in December, resulting in the impeachments of four officials who had worked for the Third River Management Office of the Water Resources Agency. In June 2009, Huang found that Examination Yuan presidential candidate Chang Chun-yen did not solicit donations from Wayne Pai. Three months later, a Control Yuan report publicized by Huang showed that the Public Construction Commission had wrongly ignored Taipei City Government in a drawn-out dispute over the construction of the Taipei Dome. Huang led a 2011 probe into the construction of the Lungmen Nuclear Power Plant, the findings of which revealed that Taipower had not adequately considered safety concerns in the plant's design. In April 2012, the Control Yuan simultaneously impeached eight customs officials on charges of corruption, which Huang stated was one of the largest such cases involving customs to be tried by the Control Yuan. Near the end of 2013, Huang began another land use investigation into the Taoyuan Aerotropolis urban development. Soon after, Huang and Chao Chang-ping announced the end of a review into the Republic of China Armed Forces. The pair stated that transitioning to an entirely volunteer-based force by 2017 would be difficult. The earliest plans to phase out conscription called for a volunteer military by 2015, a date that has been repeatedly postponed.

In March 2018, William Lai appointed Huang to lead the Transitional Justice Commission. Huang resigned the position on 6 October 2018.

== Activism ==
Huang founded the Taiwan Research Foundation in 1988, an organization credited with helping spread Taiwan studies worldwide, and is domestically recognized for its contribution to Taiwan's democratization up to the first direct presidential election in 1996. He is also known for his comprehensive research into Taiwan's National Health Insurance program while serving on the Control Yuan and is a proponent of health care reform. Huang has also served as president of the Chiang Wei-shui Foundation. He chaired the Taipei School of Economics and Political Science Foundation, which proposed the founding of the Taipei School of Economics and Political Science as National Tsing Hua University's eleventh college in 2020.
