= Taiyuan Incident =

1970 rebellion in Taiwan

Taiyuan Incident (Chinese: 泰源事件; Pe̍h-ōe-jī: Thài-goân Sū-kiāⁿ), was an anti-government rebellion in Taiwan in 1970. It was conducted by political prisoners and guards at Taiyuan Prison in Donghe Township, Taitung County, as well as some aboriginal youths sympathetic to their cause. The incident was classified by the government as a prison riot, while many Tangwai elements considered it to be a failed uprising against the ruling Kuomintang regime.

== The Incident ==
In February 1970, a group of political prisoners in Taiyuan Prison, led by Chiang Ping-hsing, secretly laid out a plan to take over the prison and began a guerrilla campaign aimed at the realization of Taiwan independence. They were able to convince some fifty Taiwanese prison guards and a number of aboriginal youths to join their cause, and planned to seize the nearby army arsenal, radio station, and a fleet docked at Taitung harbor. At noon on February 8, launched an attack on and disarmed six guards, killing one. However, the noise alerted prison authorities, thwarting further action. The prisoners could not unlock nor breach the gates of other blocks, and the commander of the guard company, who was collaborating with the prisoners, advised them to escape into the mountains.

Soon after the prisoners escaped, the prison was taken over by the infamous Taiwan Garrison Command, with its deputy commander General Liu Yu-chang taking command personally. The ROCMC Special Service Company and the ROCMC Amphibious Reconnaissance and Patrol Unit (also known as the Frogmen Unit) units were dispatched to secure the prison, and the entire guard company was arrested and interrogated. A forward command center was also established, and thousands of police officers, soldiers, and aboriginal youths were sent to locate and apprehend the prisoners. All prisoners were arrested by February 23.

== Aftermath ==
In all, five prisoners and more than twenty guards were sentenced to death, while one prisoner claimed he was forced to participate and was sentenced to 15 and half years. An unspecified number of collaborators also received various sentences from 15 years to life. The authority believed that more were involved, but the prisoners claimed that no one else was involved in planning the uprising.

Not long after the incident, all prisoners of Taiyuan Prison were transferred to the so-called "Oasis Villa" on Green Island.
