= Transitional Justice Commission =

Government agency of the Republic of China

- 促進轉型正義委員會; Cùjìn Zhuǎnxíng Zhèngyì Wěiyuánhuì

Agency overview
- Formed: 31 May 2018
- Dissolved: 30 May 2022
- Jurisdiction: Republic of China(Taiwan)
- Headquarters: Daan, Taipei
- Agency executives: Yang Tsui Chinese: 楊翠, Chairperson; Yeh Hung-ling Chinese: 葉虹靈, Vice Chairperson
- Website: www.tjc.gov.tw (in Chinese)

The Transitional Justice Commission (TJC; Chinese: 促進轉型正義委員會; pinyin: Cùjìn Zhuǎnxíng Zhèngyì Wěiyuánhuì) was an independent government agency of the Republic of China (Taiwan) active from 31 May 2018 to 30 May 2022 based on the Act on Promoting Transitional Justice. The commission is responsible for the investigation of actions taken by the Kuomintang between 15 August 1945 and 6 November 1992. The commission's main aims include: making political archives more readily available, removing authoritarian symbols, redressing judicial injustice, and producing a report on the history of the period which delineates steps to further promote transitional justice.

== History ==
The Act on Promoting Transitional Justice (促進轉型正義條例) was passed by the Legislative Yuan on 5 December 2017. The act sought to rectify injustices committed by the authoritarian Kuomintang government of the Republic of China on Taiwan, and to this end established the Transitional Justice Commission to investigate actions taken from 15 August 1945, the date of the Hirohito surrender broadcast, to 6 November 1992, when president Lee Teng-hui lifted the Temporary Provisions against the Communist Rebellion for Fuchien Province, Republic of China, ending the period of mobilization. This time period, in particular, includes the February 28 Incident as well as White Terror.

The commission was established formally on May 31, 2018 for a period of two years. Huang Huang-hsiung was chosen to chair the committee and five other members were nominated by 31 March 2018: Chang Tien-chin, Hua Yih-fen, Hsu Hsueh-chi, Eleng Tjaljimaraw, and Greg Yo. Peng Jen-yu, Yang Tsui, and Yeh Hung-ling were selected on 7 April. All nine candidates were confirmed in May 2018, though both the Kuomintang and People First Party legislative caucuses abstained from voting. The committee began operations on 31 May 2018. Following a scandal, vice chairman Chang Tien-chin resigned from the commission on 12 September 2018, Huang Huang-hsiung resigned the chairmanship on 6 October 2018, and Yang Tsui was subsequently appointed acting chairperson.

In April 2020, the Legislative Yuan extended the committee's tenure by one year, and the committee members were formally reappointed on May 26, 2020, although the Pan-Blue Coalition again boycotted the vote. Yang Tsui was formally elected chairperson, serving alongside committee members Awi Mona, Chen Yu-fan, Hsu Wei-chun, Lin Chia-fan, Peng Jen-yu, Frank Wang, and Yeh Hung-ling. Following this extension, the Commission is scheduled to deliver its final report in May 2021.

=== Interaction with other transitional justice organizations ===
The commission has worked together with other organizations dedicated to transitional justice, such as the May 18 Memorial Foundation from South Korea and the Stasi Records Agency of Germany. An exhibit on the Gwangju Uprising opened in Taipei on 6 December 2019 and a letter of intent to hold regular workshops and exchanges with the Stasi Records Agency was signed on 13 December 2019.

=== Website blockage in Hong Kong ===
On 13 February 2021, Hong Kong netizens reported that its website cannot be accessed from Hong Kong. Some local medias confirmed that they couldn't access the site without using a Virtual Private Network (VPN). The police refused to comment on the blockage.

== Results ==
=== Exonerating political convictions ===
As a result of the commission's recommendations, a total of 5,837 people convicted of political crimes during White Terror have been exonerated due to recommendations made by the commission. The first recommendation, also the first in Taiwanese history, came on 5 October 2018, when 1,270 people were exonerated, including writer Yang Kui and 27 Taiwanese aborigines. On 27 February 1,056 people were exonerated. On 30 May 2019, 3,062 people were exonerated, including former vice president Annette Lu, former mayor of Kaohsiung Chen Chu, editor of Free China Journal Lei Chen, and Shih Ming-teh. On November 8, 2020, the commission further overturned 12 sentences, bringing the total to 5,874. On October 2, 2021 the Commission overturned the sentences of five inmates who were executed in the 1970 Taiyuan Incident.

=== Removing symbols of authoritarianism ===
On 17 December 2018, the commission recommended that the honor guard at Chiang Kai-shek Memorial Hall be discontinued, as it is a symbol of the authoritarian era. The commission also recommended that the hall display permanent exhibits dedicated to human rights and democracy. On 30 March 2019, the commission announced its intention to survey roads in Taiwan named after Chiang Kai-shek for potential renaming, as well as a survey on statues of Chiang in parks across the country for potential removal. A report was released on July 10, 2020 which listed a total of 1,814 sites named after Chiang Kai-shek and Chiang Ching-kuo, as well as 1,235 monuments to them, and 848 statues of Chiang Kai-shek remaining (excluding those in Cihu Park). The commission recommended the removal of the statues and renaming of the sites, leaving implementation to the respective agencies. On October 26, 2020, the commission reported that 70% of the statues have been removed. On April 6, 2021, the commission reported that 537 authoritarian symbols remained, while 403 have been removed, though the Ministry of Education, Ministry of Defense and Veterans Affairs Council have not reported on statues within their jurisdiction. In April 2024, the DPP-led government announced that it would remove 760 remaining statues of Chiang Kai-shek.

=== Declassifying documents from the martial law period ===
On 4 July 2019, the Legislative Yuan passed a bill declassifying all government documents relating to the February 28 Incident, White Terror and period of mobilization. When the act was passed, the National Security Bureau held files concerning the deaths of Chen Wen-chen and the Lin family massacre which were still classified.

On 7 December 2019, the commission announced that government intelligence reports regarding the Kaohsiung Incident had been declassified. The reports were said to show that the government had an informer inside staff of Formosa Magazine, which organized the protests. The commission did not say when the reports would be released to the public.

On 17 February 2020, the commission released a report that found that intelligence agencies were most likely involved in the Lin family massacre during martial law. The report found that Lin had been under surveillance for the year leading up to the murders, and that the National Security Bureau had destroyed evidence related to the murders. On 28 February 2020, President Tsai Ing-wen ordered the National Security Bureau to declassify political documents requested by the commission within one month. On March 28, the National Security Bureau transferred the files to the National Archives Administration, including files related to the Lin family massacre and the death of Chen Wen-chen. On 4 May 2020, a report on the death of Chen Wen-chen was released. It concluded that Chen was most likely killed by state security, in contradiction with the official ruling of suicide at the time.

Some of the declassified files have shown a close relationship between the Kuomintang and members of the Bamboo Union gang during martial law. Documents from the Taiwan Provincial Police Division, now the National Police Agency, declassified on November 12, 2020 showed the extent of the KMT surveillance apparatus, which continued until Chen Shui-bian won the presidency in 2000 and reached its peak of 15,000 people in a year.

=== Political trials database and reports ===
On February 26, 2020, the commission publicly released a database consisting of government documents concerning military trials during martial law, covering 3,195 court cases. The database does not contain information on those who were executed without trial. This database was expanded to include 13,000 cases by February 2021, revealing that Chiang Kai-shek participated directly in about 5,000 of them. The database also showed that 55% of the defendants were born in Taiwan, while 45% were born in China.

On 8 March 2020, a report totalling over 1,200 pages titled The Draft Report on the Truth of the 228 Incident and Transitional Justice was published by the commission.

=== Other ===
In May 2020, the commission announced that the concept of transitional justice would be included as a part of the civics and social sciences curriculum in public schools, in addition to the current topics of human rights and state-perpetrated violence.

== Eastern Depot scandal ==
During an internal meeting on 24 August 2018, then vice chairperson Chang Tien-chin named Hou You-yi, who was then running for mayor of New Taipei City as a member of the opposition Kuomintang party, as a potential subject of investigation to benefit his party, the ruling Democratic Progressive Party, in the 2018 Taiwanese municipal elections. During the conversation, researcher Hsiao Jinan compared the committee to the Eastern Depot from the Ming Dynasty. Associate researcher Wu Pei-rong recorded the conversation and leaked it to the media. It was published on 11 September 2018 and resulted in Chang's resignation the next day, followed by Wu and Hsiao shortly thereafter. Commission chairperson Huang also resigned a month later. Commission member Yang Tsui subsequently served as Acting Chairperson before being formally named Chairperson on 26 May 2020. Chang was later impeached by the Control Yuan on 1 October 2019.

== Final report and dissolution ==
A mission conclusion report is due to be published on 30 May 2022, after which the Transitional Justice Commission will be dissolved. A transitional justice board will replace the TJC and be responsible for coordination of transitional justice initiatives between government agencies. The report recommended removing Chiang from currencies.

== Chairpersons ==
Democratic Progressive Party Independent/unknown Social Democratic Party

No.	Name	Term of Office		Days	Political Party	Premier
1	Huang Huang-hsiung (黃煌雄)	31 May 2018	6 October 2018	128	Democratic Progressive Party	William Lai
2	Yang Tsui (楊翠)	16 October 2018	30 May 2021	957		William Lai Su Tseng-chang II
--	Yeh Hung-ling (葉虹靈)	31 May 2021	30 May 2022	729	Social Democratic Party	Su Tseng-chang II

== See also ==
- Human rights in Taiwan
- Ill-gotten Party Assets Settlement Committee
- National Human Rights Museum
