= Period of mobilization for the suppression of Communist rebellion =

- Traditional Chinese: 動員戡亂時期
Transcriptions
Standard Mandarin
- Hanyu Pinyin: Dòngyuán Kānluàn Shíqí
- Wade–Giles: Tung⁴-yüan² K′an¹-luan⁴ Shih²-ch′i²
Hakka
- Pha̍k-fa-sṳ: Thûng-yèn Khâm-lon sṳ̀-khì
Southern Min
- Hokkien POJ: Tōng-oân Kham-loān sî-kî
- Tâi-lô: Tōng-uân Kham-luān sî-kî

Period of mobilization for the suppression of Communist rebellion (Chinese: 動員戡亂時期; pinyin: Dòngyuán Kānluàn Shíqí; Pe̍h-ōe-jī: Tōng-oân Kham-loān sî-kî) is a political term used by the Kuomintang-led government of the Republic of China to indicate the country's entering into a state of emergency with the raising Chinese Civil War. The term aimed to mobilize the people and resources under Kuomintang's control to fight the Chinese Communist Party rebellion.

The term was announced in July 1947 by Chiang Kai-shek, the chairman of the Nationalist Government, as an administrative order. As the situations worsen by time, it was then turned into a constitutional amendment named Temporary Provisions against the Communist Rebellion (動員戡亂時期臨時條款) on 10 May 1948. As the Chinese Communist Revolution progressed, the Temporary Provisions were no longer enforced in most areas of China as the CCP's armed forces expelled the Kuomintang's armed forces. However, it was still enforced by the Kuomintang-led government of the Republic of China in Taiwan until the early 1990s.

== The temporary provisions ==
In 1946, the Chinese Civil War between the Chinese Communist Party (CCP) and the Government of the Republic of China had resumed, in response of the war, the first session of the National Assembly convened in 1948 enacted the "Mobilization for the Suppression of Communist Rebellion Provisional Act". The Provisional Act is provided to the then President Chiang Kai-shek extended powers to mobilize against the CCP. After the central government of the Republic of China had relocated to Taiwan in 1949, the Provisional Act provided the government ways to suppress its opponents.

== Enforcement of the temporary provisions ==
=== Mainland China ===
This Temporary Provisions extended the power of the President and limited civil liberties. The Kuomintang-led government also released two Declaration of Nationwide Martial Law in 1948 and 1949. With the progression Chinese Communist Revolution, the Temporary Provisions were no longer valid in most of the Chinese territory after the Communist's armed forces expelled the Kuomintang's armed forces. By the end of 1949, the Chinese Communist Party have founded the People's Republic of China and controlled almost the whole mainland China. Thus Temporary Provisions is no longer enforced except some small piece of territory that is still controlled by the Kuomintang, notably the following territories that is transferred after 1949

- Hainan: ROC government lost control after the Landing Operation on Hainan Island in May 1950.
- Some offshore islands of Chekiang: ROC government lost control after the Battle of Yijiangshan Islands in January 1955.

=== Kinmen and Matsu ===
Kinmen and Matsu Islands is part of the traditional Fujian and was declared as Alert Zone in the first Declaration of Nationwide Martial Law on 10 December 1948. Then, they were moved to the War Zone in the second Declaration of Nationwide Martial Law on 7 July 1949. With the government of the Republic of China's retreat to Taiwan, the islands became the frontier between the administration of Taiwan and China. Several battles happened in Kinmen in the 1950s.

The government of the Republic of China in Taipei enforced the War Zone Administration in Kinmen and Matsu Islands since 1956. Under this special decree, the civil Fujian Provincial Government was replaced by the military defense commands in Kinmen and Matsu Islands. Kinmen County Government, Lienchiang County Government and other field offices of the central government were all placed under the control of the military defense commands in the two places.

The War Zone Administrations existed even after the temporary provisions was repealed in May 1991. Kinmen and Matsu experienced the longest period of military control under the period of mobilization for the suppression of Communist rebellion from 1948 to November 1992.

=== Taiwan and Penghu ===
Taiwan was under Japanese rule before 1945. After the World War II, the Republic of China occupied Taiwan on behalf of the Allies. However, with the fast changing situation of the Chinese Civil War. Taiwan hosts the lost Kuomintang-led government of the Republic of China after December 1949. The Temporary Provisions were brought to Taiwan along with the government. In Taiwan the term "White Terror" is often used to describe the era.

== Termination ==
The period was formally ended by President Lee Teng-hui on 1 May 1991 by repealing the Temporary Provisions against the Communist Rebellion and replaced with the Additional Articles of the Constitution. All the declarations of martial laws based on Temporary Provisions were nullified when the Temporary Provisions repealed on 1 May 1991. However, the Ministry of National Defense then issued a temporary declaration of martial law effective in the frontier region including Fukien Province (Kinmen and Matsu) and South China Sea Islands (Tungsha, and Taiping Island in Nansha). The temporary martial law was lifted on 7 November 1992, this marked that all the Free area of the Republic of China has turned into constitutional democracy.

== See also ==
- History of the Republic of China
- Republic of China (1912–1949)
- Chinese Civil War
- Chinese Communist Revolution
- Temporary Provisions against the Communist Rebellion
- Transitional Justice Commission
