= Wind power in Taiwan =

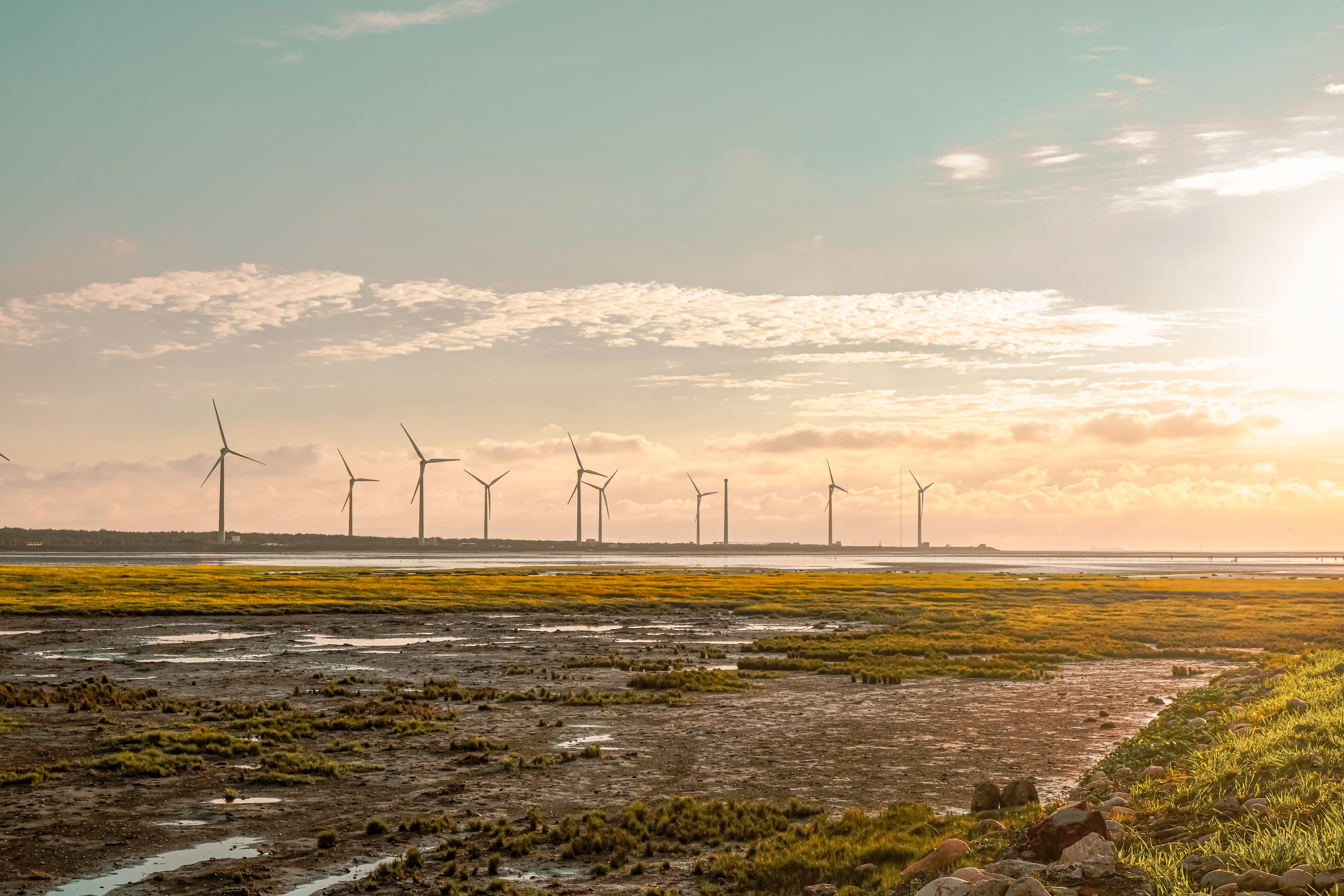
A wind farm in Qingshui District, Taichung

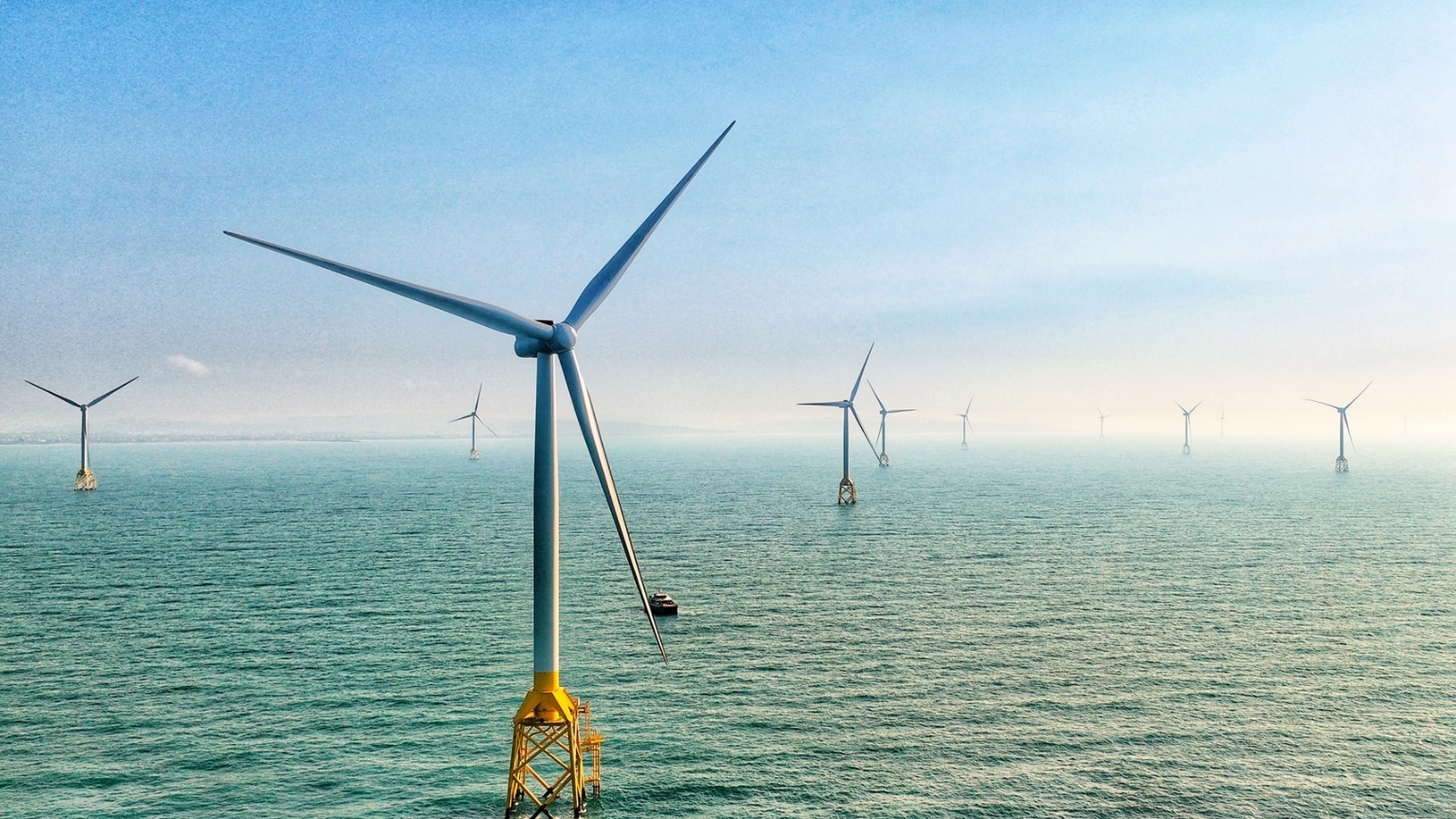
Part of the Formosa 2 Offshore Wind Farm

Wind power is a major industry in Taiwan. Taiwan has abundant wind resources, but a lack of space on land means that most major developments are offshore.

== Industry ==
Taiwan has abundant wind power resources. In 2013, Taiwan's onshore wind farm capacity factor is 28-29%, while its future offshore wind farm is 33-38%, with the total installed onshore wind capacity of 530 MW. There are currently 55 integrated and automated wind power forecasting systems established in Zhongtun, Kinmen, Mailiao, Changgong and Shihu.

The first phase of wind power installation was done in January 2003 until December 2008, in which 59 wind turbines were put into commercial operations in Shinmen, Tatan Unit 1, Guanyuan, Shianshan, Port of Taichung, Taichung Power Plant and Hengchun with a total installed capacity of 96.96 MW. The second phase was done in January 2005 until September 2011, in which 58 turbines were put into operation in Changgong Unit 1, Yunlin Mailiao, Sihu, Linko and Tatan Wind Power Stations. The third phase was done in January 2007 until July 2011, in which 28 turbines were put into operation in Changgong Unit 2, Yunlin Mailiao Unit 2, Changhua Wanggong and Tatan II Wind Power Stations with a total capacity of 59.6 MW.

The fourth phase of wind power installation is currently under construction with the expected completion schedule by June 2015. Once completed, it will bring the total capacity of wind power to be 14.8 MW, generating 43.081 GWh per year. The Penghu Island Low-Carbon Island Wind Power Project is scheduled to be completed by the end of June 2016 with a total capacity of 33 MW, generating 116.251 GWh per year.

In 2007, the National Penghu University of Science and Technology in Penghu County started a project commissioned and funded by National Science Council to establish a 5,000 m^{2} wind park at the campus area for educational and research purposes. It now hosts 47 small, experimental turbines installed by 20 international companies. All of the turbines have their own monitoring system which record the condition and efficacy. Data is then transmitted by Internet for analysis and improvements. The government plan to construct a total of 450 onshore wind turbines and 600 offshore wind turbines by 2030, aiming at a capacity of 4,200 MW, of which 1,200 MW will be for onshore and 3,000 MW will be for offshore. Two 4 MW Siemens Wind Power offshore turbines in the "Formosa 1" project were being installed in 2016-2017, and guidelines for offshore wind developments were finalized.

In 2020 developer Orsted sold a 50% stake in the Greater Changhua 1 Offshore Wind Farm to Caisse de depot et placement du Quebec and Cathay PE for $2.7 billion.

== Offshore wind farms ==
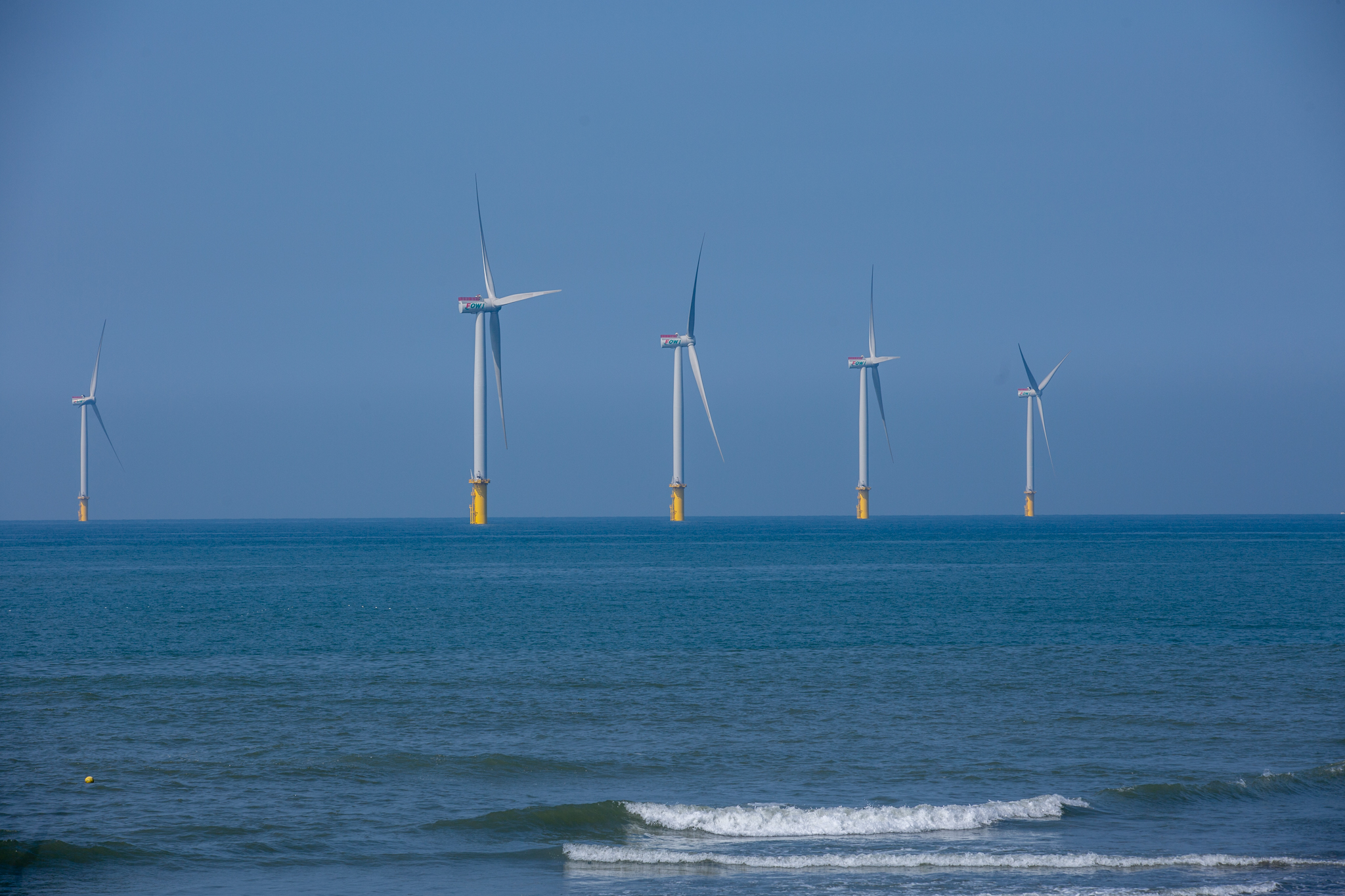
Formosa 1 Offshore Wind Farm

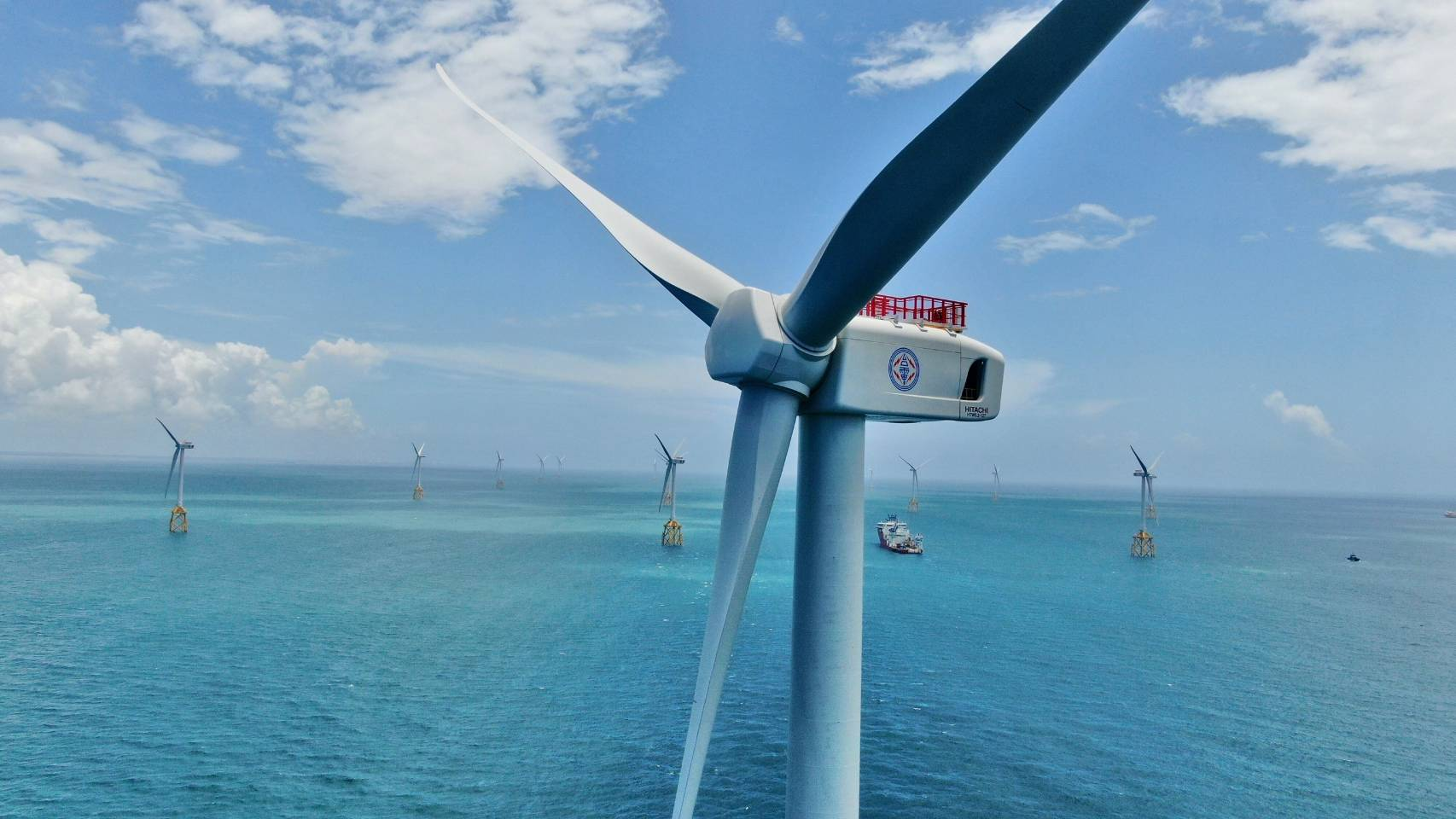
Formosa 2 Offshore Wind Farm

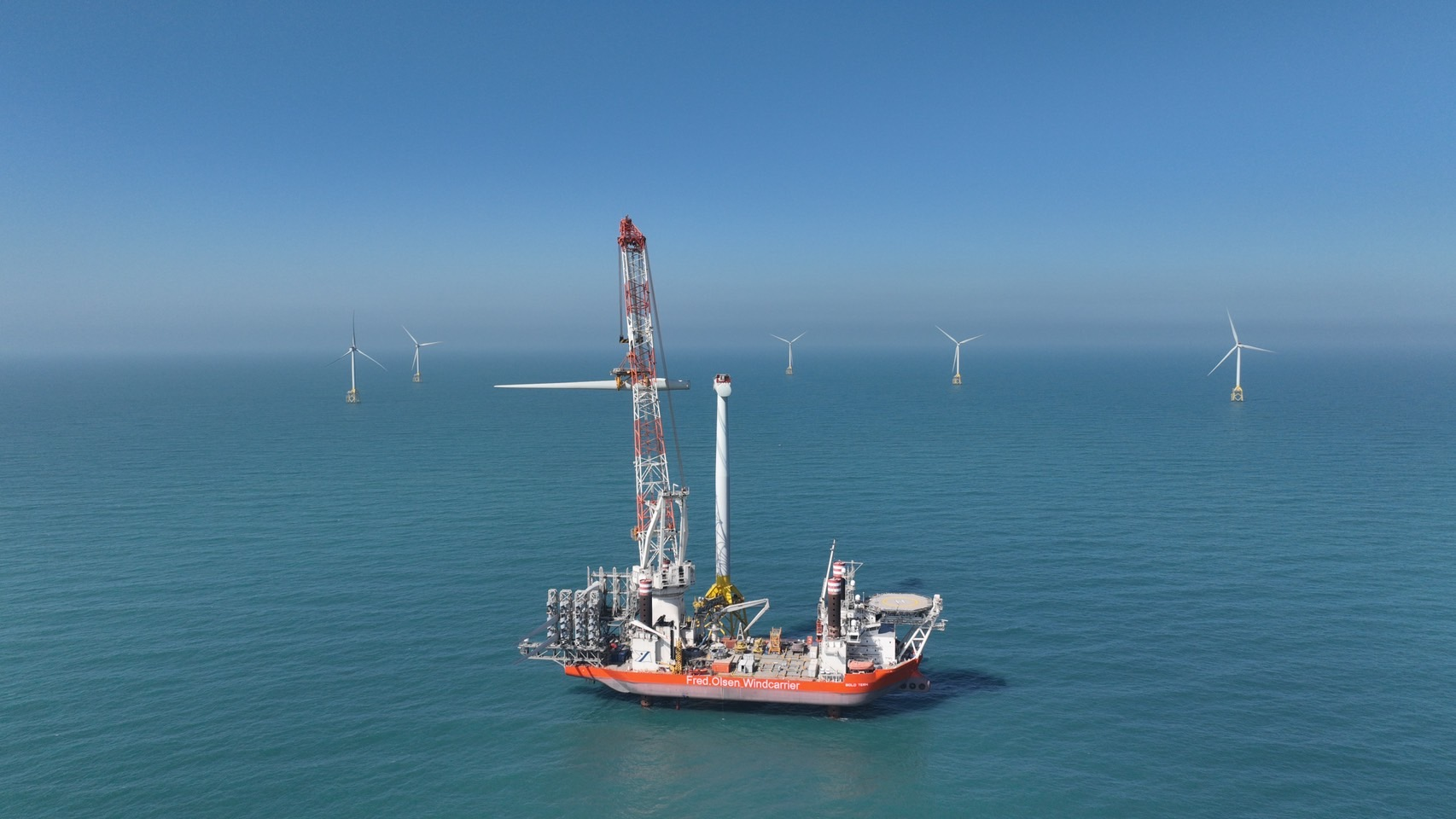
Formosa 2 Offshore Wind Farm installation

The first offshore wind farms in Taiwan, Formosa 1 Offshore Wind Farm, started its commercial operation in April 2017 at off the coast of Miaoli County. The development project is led by Swancor Renewable. The firsts stage of the construction involved two 4 MW wind turbines which were installed in November 2016 with a total generation capacity of 8 MW. The second stage of the construction was on-grid in December 2019 which involved 20 Siemens Gamesa SWT-6.0-154 turbines with a total capacity of 120 MW. The Yunlin project first yielded power in late 2021.

The Formosa II wind farm was also constructed offshore Miaoli County, with a capacity of 376MW. It was completed and inaugurated on May 16, 2023. Formosa III wind farm will be constructed offshore Changhua County with a planned capacity of 1,900 MW. It is also expected to pass the EPA and obtain its license in 2017. In 2020 TSMC signed a 20-year power purchase agreement (PPA) from 2026 for 920 MW.

At the end of 2022, the Ministry of Economic Affairs approved seven projects, of which three were zero-subsidy with corporate PPAs. The 298 MW Zhong Neng offshore wind farm started construction in 2023, the 1 GW Hai Long started construction in 2024, and the 640 MW Yunlin was completed in 2025.

By 2026, Taiwan had 4.8 GW of offshore wind power capacity.

== Generation ==
=== Installed capacity and generation ===
Installed wind power capacity and generation in Taiwan in recent years is shown in the table and the diagram below:

Diagram with installed wind power capacity and generation in Taiwan in recent years. View chart definition.

Year	Capacity (MW)	Generation (GWh)
2025	4517.2	10,202.45
2024	3905.04	10,509.81
2023	2677.42	6,238.2
2022	1581.05	3,577.4
2021	1094.16	2,270.7
2020	937.1	2,308.8
2019	845.15	1,892.2
2018	713.19	1,706.8
2017	692.39	1,722.5
2016	682.09	1,457.1
2015	646.69	1,525.2
2014	637.19	1,500.4
2013	614.19	1,640.0
2012	570.99	1,413.4
2011	522.69	1,492.7
2010	475.89	1,026.3
2009	374.29	786.6
2008	250.39	588.2
2007	185.99	439.5
2006	101.99	276.1
2005	23.94	91.3
2004	8.54	25.3
2003	8.54	23.8
2002	8.54	15.9
2001	5.04	12.2
2000	2.64	1.4

== See also ==
- Wind power
- Offshore wind power
- Energy in Taiwan
- Solar power in Taiwan
- Renewable energy in Taiwan
- Electricity sector in Taiwan
- Renewable energy by country
- List of power stations in Taiwan
- Plug-in electric vehicles in Taiwan
- Green Jade
