= Formosa 2 Offshore Wind Farm =

Upcoming wind farm in Miaoli County, Taiwan

Formosa 2 Offshore Wind Farm 海能離岸風力發電場
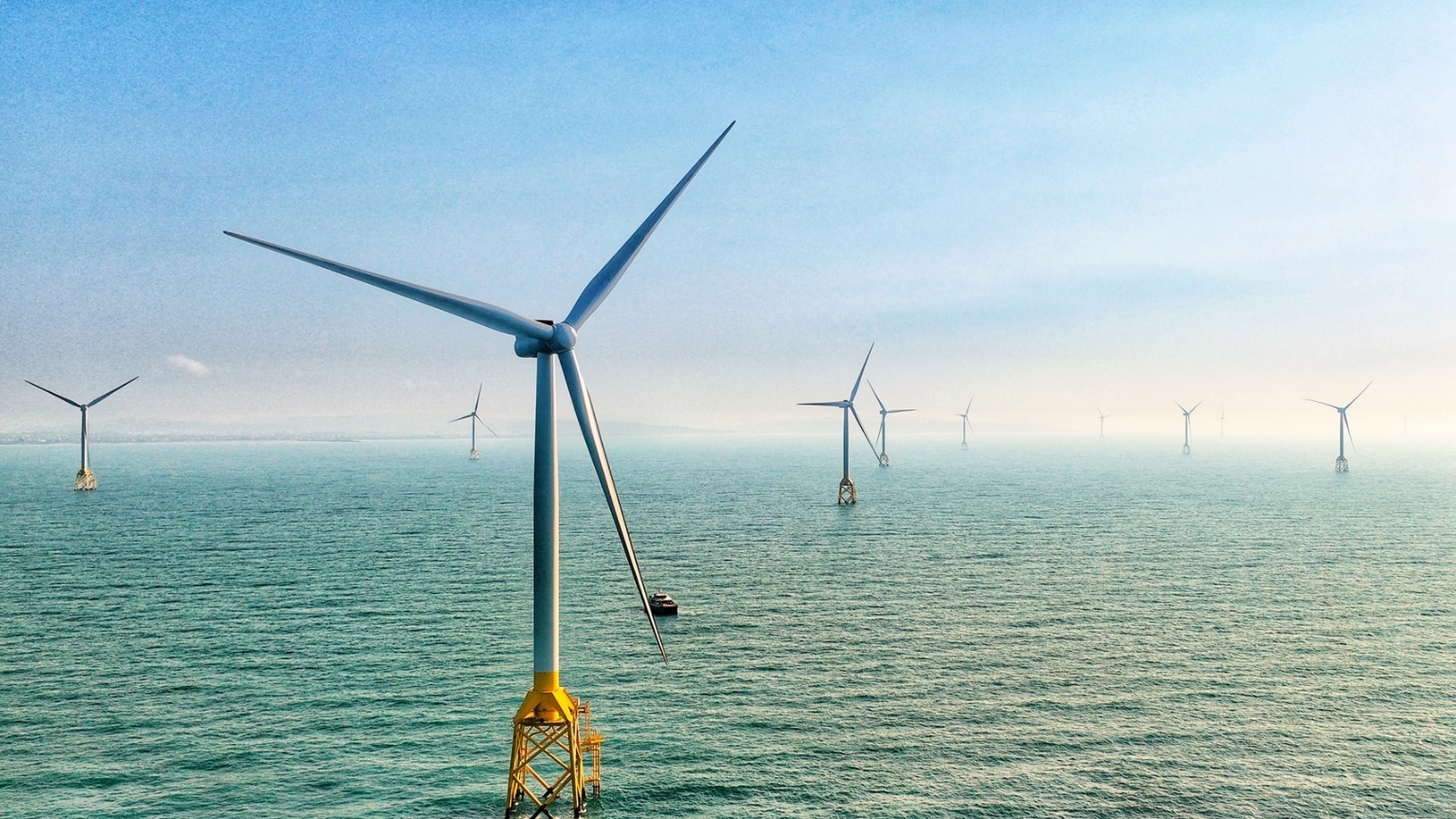
- Country: Taiwan
- Location: Miaoli County, Taiwan
- Coordinates: 24°42′58.3″N 120°46′31.8″E
- Status: Operational
- Commission date: 21 March 2023
- Owners: JERA; Macquarie Group

Wind farm
- Type: Offshore
- Distance from shore: 9.5 km

Power generation
- Units operational: 47
- Nameplate capacity: 376 MW

External links
- Website: Official website

The Formosa 2 Offshore Wind Farm (traditional Chinese: 海能離岸風力發電場; simplified Chinese: 海能离岸风力发电场; pinyin: Hǎinéng Lí'àn Fēnglì Fādiànchǎng) is a 376 MW offshore wind power station located near Miaoli County, Taiwan.

== History ==
Jan De Nul was awarded the engineering, procurement, and construction contract for the foundation and subsea cable installation in June 2019. In July 2019, Seajacks International was subcontracted by Siemens Gamesa for the wind turbines transportation and installation and LS Cable & System was subcontracted by Jan De Nul for the supply of 130 km submarine cable. Sembcorp Marine Offshore Platforms and Saipem were subcontracted by Jan De Nul to fabricate jacket foundations in September 2019 and November 2019 respectively. In October 2019, Seaway 7 was subcontracted by Jan De Nul to transport and install the jacket foundations in October 2019.

The financial close for the project was made in October 2019. The onshore construction works started in December 2019 and the offshore construction works started in the first half of 2020.

The project was completed and inaugurated on May 16, 2023, and is expected to supply power to approximately 380,000 households.

== Architecture ==
The wind farm is located 9.5 km offshore of Miaoli County.

== Technical specifications ==
The wind farm consists of 47 generating units. Each of its turbine will have a 167-meter diameter rotor and 81.5 meter blades, with a swept area of 21,900 m^{2}, with a rated capacity of 8 MW.

== See also ==
- Renewable energy in Taiwan
- Wind power in Taiwan
- Electricity sector in Taiwan
