= Greater Changhua Offshore Wind Farms =

Offshore wind farms under construction off Changhua County, Taiwan

- Country: Taiwan
- Location: Changhua County, Taiwan
- Status: Under construction
- Construction began: November 2019
- Commission date: April 2024 (Changhua 1, Changhua 2A); 2026 (Changhua 2B, Changhua 4)
- Owner: Ørsted

Wind farm
- Type: Offshore
- Site area: 108.7 km^{2} (Changhua 1)

Power generation
- Units planned: 2.4 GW

The Greater Changhua Offshore Wind Farms (Chinese: 大彰化離岸風力發電場; Pe̍h-ōe-jī: Toā Chiong-hoà lî-hoāⁿ hong-le̍k hoat-tiān-tiûⁿ) are a series of offshore wind farms currently under construction off the coast of Changhua County, Taiwan.

== History ==
The project was approved by the Environmental Protection Administration in February 2018 and is owned by Ørsted. The approval for Ørsted to connect the wind power to Taiwan's electrical grid was granted in April 2018. The construction for the 900 MW wind farms began with the onshore construction for Changhua 1 and Changhua 2A wind farms in November 2019. The first turbines sent electricity to the grid in April 2022, and completion is expected for year's end. A coral growth program tests ability to mitigate coral bleaching.

== Technical specifications ==
The proposed wind farms consists of four wind farms, which are Changhua 1, Changhua 2A, Changhua 2B and Changhua 4. Changhua 1 has a capacity of 605 MW and will be located in a water depth of 34.4–44.1 meters across an area of 108.7 km^{2}. Changhua 2a has a capacity of 295 MW.

2b is 337 MW and uses suction bucket foundations and recycled wind turbine blades.

== See also ==
- Renewable energy in Taiwan
- Wind power in Taiwan
- Electricity sector in Taiwan
