= Green Jade =

Crane vessel

Green Jade is a crane vessel built to support the offshore wind industry.

== Design ==
Green Jade is 216.5 metres (710 ft 4 in) long, 49 metres (160 ft 9 in) wide. Its main crane capacity is 4,000 tonnes (3,900 long tons; 4,400 short tons). Crew accommodations are for up to 160. The main crane was made by Huisman Equipment.

== Naming ==
Green Jade is named after Yu Shan, the tallest mountain in Taiwan.

== History ==
Green Jade was built at CSBC Corporation, Taiwan's Kaohsiung yard. First steel was cut in September 2020 and the keel was laid in March 2021.

Green Jade's launching in April 2022 was attended by Taiwanese Premier Su Tseng-chang. At the time of its launching it was the second largest vessel of its kind in the world. Green Jade is owned by CSBC-DEME Wind Engineering Co.

Green Jade was involved in the installation of the Hai Long offshore wind farm.

In 2024 multinational Wärtsilä entered into an operating agreement for the Green Jade with its owners.

== See also ==
- Wind power in Taiwan
