= Solar power in Taiwan =

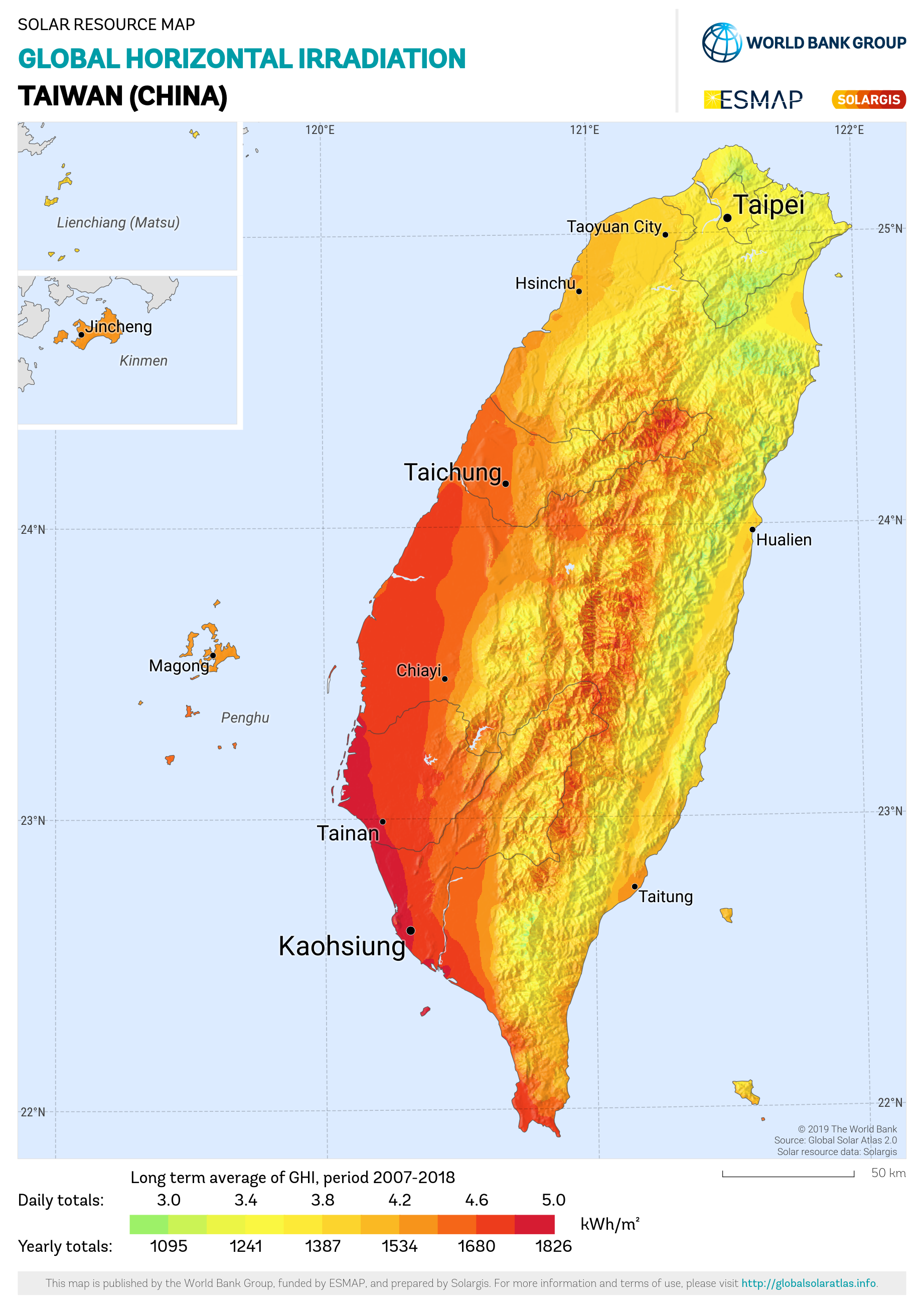
- Solar irradiation map of Taiwan
- Installed capacity: 14.28 GW (2024) (17th)
- Annual generation: 14.91 TWh (2024)
- Capacity per capita: 605 W (2024)
- Share of electricity: 5.2 (2024)

Solar power contributes 15.29 TWh of generation to the Taiwanese grid, accounting for 5.2% of total electric power generation as of 2024. Taiwan has 14.28 GW of installed capacity.Taiwan's goal, in the net-zero roadmap of the country's National Development Council (NDC), is to construct 20 GW by 2025 and 40-80 GW by 2050.

== History ==
There is strong solar energy potential in the entire country. Research published in 2022 noted that Taipei has the weakest solar irradiance, but there is still substantial benefit to rooftop solar, especially in the pursuit of an ambitious net-zero goal.

In 2012, the Million Rooftop Photo Voltaic and Thousand Wind Turbines programs were initiated. In 2014, the Rising Green Energy Industry Program was also initiated.

== Statistics ==
Taiwan's installed solar power capacity and generation in recent years is shown in the table below:

Year	Capacity (MW)	Generation (GWh p.a.)
2000	0.1	0.12
2001	0.2	0.26
2002	0.3	0.34
2003	0.4	0.46
2004	0.5	0.58
2005	1.0	0.96
2006	1.4	1.45
2007	2.4	2.18
2008	5.5	4.47
2009	9.5	9.11
2010	34.5	21.72
2011	129.9	61.62
2012	231.2	159.87
2013	409.9	321.09
2014	635.9	528.76
2015	884.2	850.26
2016	1245.0	1109.00
2017	1767.7	1667.45
2018	2738.1	2712.03
2019	4149.5	4015.94
2020	5817.2	6074.67
2021	7700.2	7970.19
2022	9723.7	10675.32
2023	12417.6	12909.73
2024	14281.1	15295.93

== See also ==
- Solar power
- Photovoltaics
- Growth of photovoltaics
- Energy in Taiwan
- Renewable energy in Taiwan
