= Renewable energy in Taiwan =

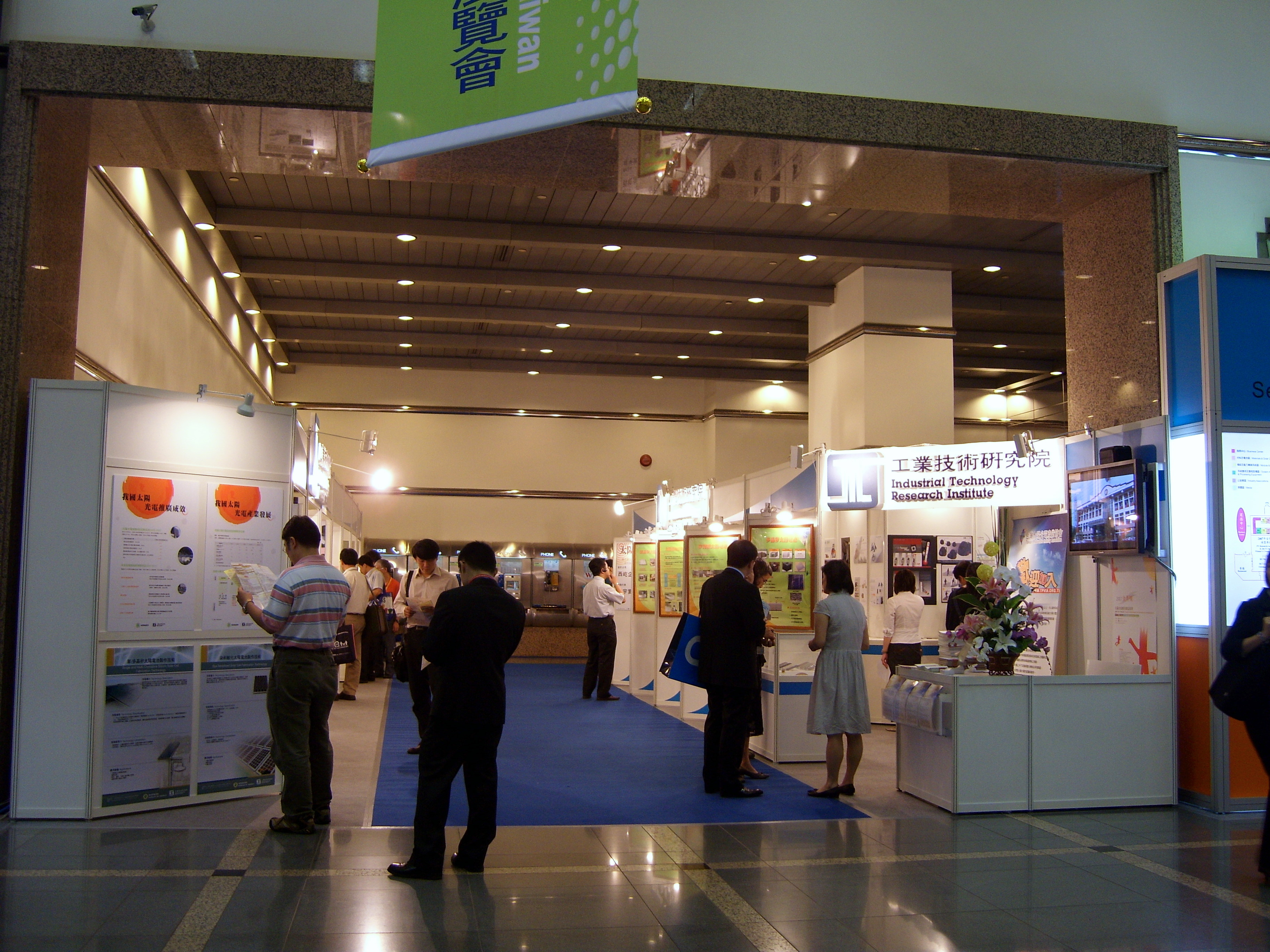
Renewable energy technology exhibition in Taiwan in 2007

Renewable energy in Taiwan contributed to 16.8% of national electricity generation as of 2024. Taiwan used renewables to generate 30.02 TWh in 2024. The total installed capacity of renewable energy in Taiwan by the end of 2013 was 3.76 GW.

As of 2021, Taiwan had set a target to generate 20% of its energy from renewable sources by 2025, an increase from the 5% achieved in 2020. This plan is part of a broader policy to reduce coal usage, enhance the use of liquefied natural gas (LNG), and transition towards a "nuclear-free homeland." The strategy includes adding 5.7 GW of offshore wind power and increasing solar energy capacity to 20 GW by 2025.

== Renewable energy policy ==
In November 2003, the government introduced guaranteed prices of electricity generated from renewable energy sources. In 2009, the government passed the Renewable Energy Development Act (REDA) aiming to increase the installed renewable energy capacity in Taiwan to 9.95 GW by 2030. Feed-in tariff regulated by REDA applies to solar, onshore wind, offshore wind, biomass and hydro energy.

In 2012, the Million Rooftop Photo Voltaic and Thousand Wind Turbines programs were initiated. In 2014, the Rising Green Energy Industry Program was also initiated.

A Greenhouse Gas Reduction and Management Act was passed by the Legislative Yuan on 15 June 2015 and promulgated by President Ma Ying-jeou on 1 July 2015, providing a legal basis for government action on climate change. The measures, ranging from inventory, registration, inspection, management, efficiency standards and cap and trade system, call for gradual, phased process with control targets every five years.

President-elect Tsai Ing-wen said in January 2015 that her party aimed to phase out nuclear power in Taiwan by 2025 and to increase the share of renewable energy generation to 20% by that year.

As part of its efforts to promote solar power, the Cabinet in October 2017 stimulus package to subsidize the construction and design of solar panel installations on residential rooftops, to be implemented in 2018. The package covers 40 percent of construction costs and 100 percent of design costs until 2020. Furthermore, the government lifted restrictions on illegal solar structures, allowing owners to keep the panels. According to Minister of Economic Affairs Shen Jong-chin (沈榮津), the plan seeks to cover 100 percent of the construction costs of public solar power stations in remote and Aboriginal areas. However, Taiwan's Bureau of Energy said Wednesday stated the government would only cover 50 percent of the costs "in remote areas."

In 31, December, 2020, "Regulations for the Management of Setting up Renewable Energy Power Generation Equipment of Power Users above a Certain Contract Capacity" was launched as the first regulations practicalising the implementation of renewable infrastructure in the specific building development type.

The Statute for Renewable Energy Development in Taiwan, as detailed by the International Energy Agency (IEA), represents the government's efforts to transform its energy sector. This statute outlines targets, striving for 8% of electricity from renewable sources by 2025 and the installation of 6,500 to 10,000 MW of renewable energy capacity by 2030. The targeted energy sources encompass a range including solar, geothermal, ocean energies, wind power, biofuels, and renewable hydrogen power.

== Renewable energy ==
=== Biogas ===
Biogas is widespread in the Taiwanese agricultural industry with 70-80% of large livestock operations having a biogas system. These convert agricultural waste into electricity or heat.

=== Hydro energy ===
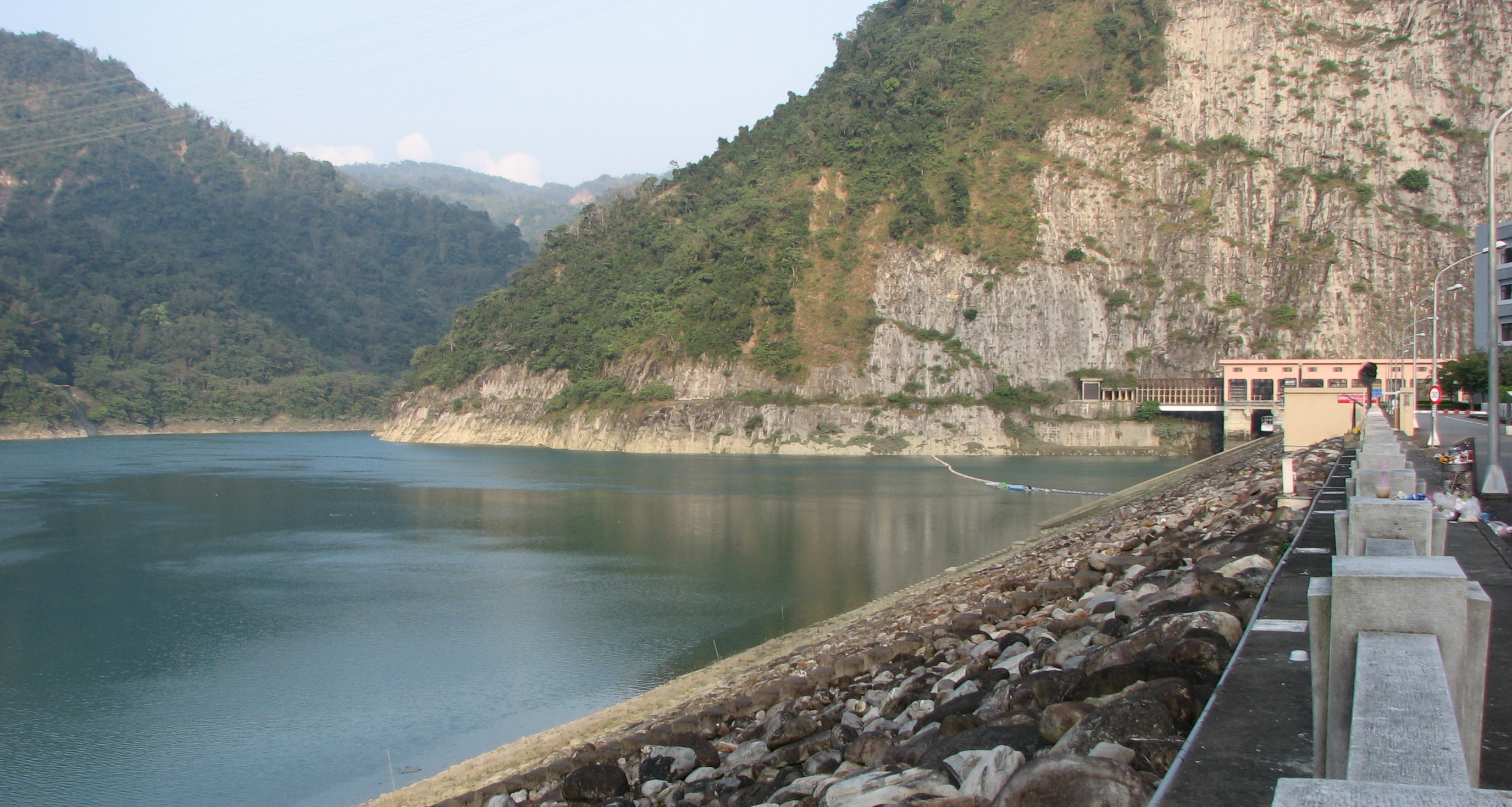
Mingtan Pumped Storage Hydro Power Plant in Shuili Township, Nantou County

The first hydro power plant in Taiwan was built in 1905 during the Japanese rule of Taiwan. Because of environmental concern, the construction of large hydro power plants are no longer planned, thus the trend moves to constructing small hydro power plants. In June 1995, Taipower and Water Resources Agency of the Ministry of Economic Affairs completed an investigation to determine the potential of hydro power in Taiwan. The research concluded that there is a potential of 11,730 MW theoretical hydro energy capacity, while the feasible capacity is 5,000 MW. Since 2001, contribution of electricity from hydro power has decreased due to the aftermath of the 1999 Chi-Chi earthquake.

At the end of 2005, the total installed capacity of hydropower in Taiwan was 4,539.9 MW, of which 2,602 MW came from pumped-storage hydroelectricity. Taiwan's largest hydro power plant is the Mingtan Pumped Storage Hydro Power Plant opened in 1995. The plant is located in Shuili Township, Nantou County with a capacity of 1,602 MW, acting as the pump-storage hydroelectricity source.

=== Photovoltaic energy ===
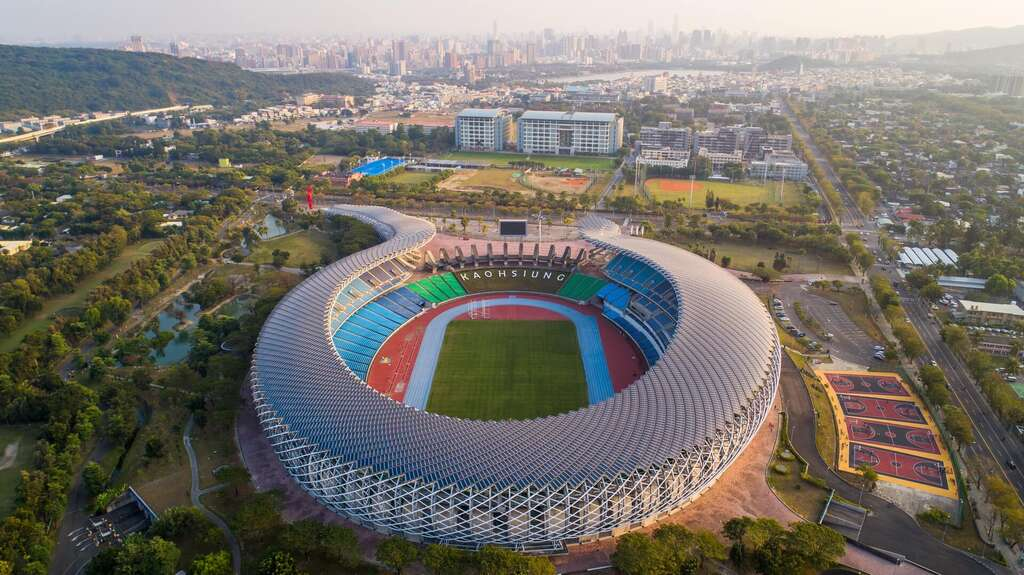
National Stadium in Zuoying District, Kaohsiung

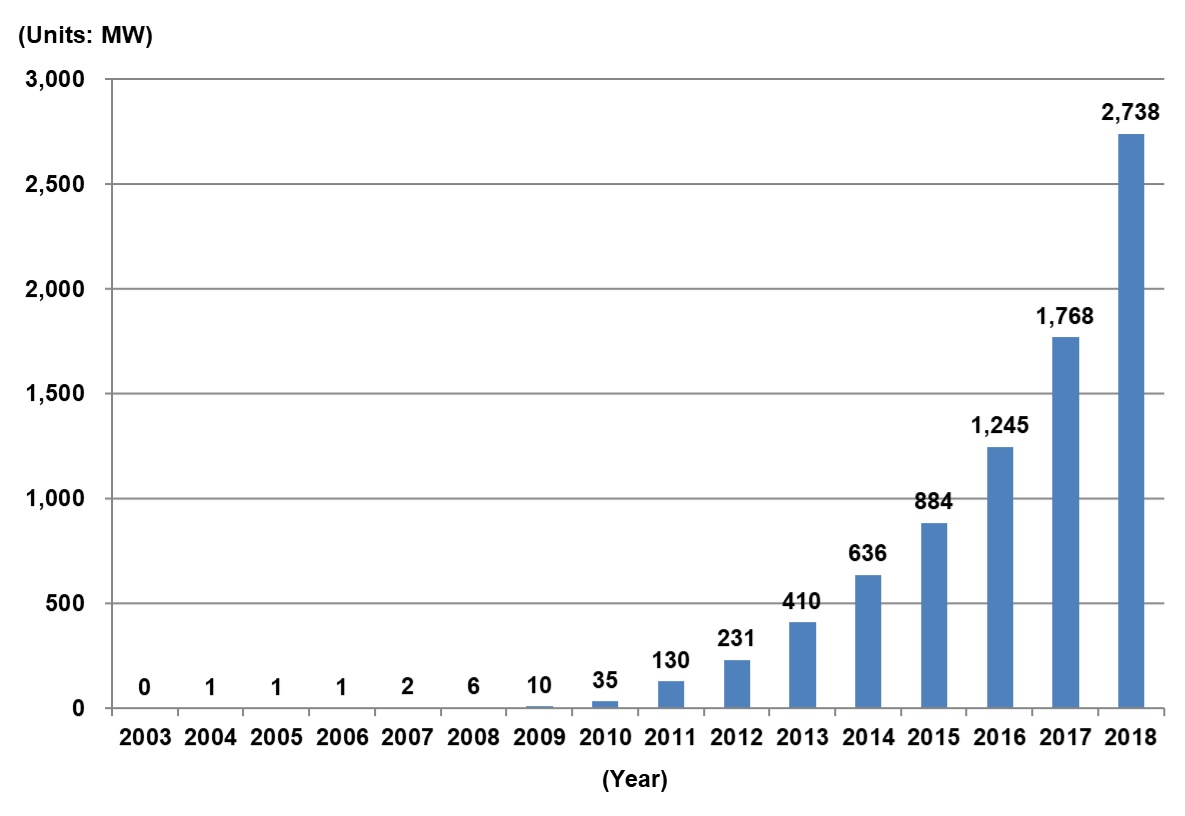
Taiwan photovoltaic installed capacity.

In 2013, the capacity factor of solar power in Taiwan was 14%. The total photovoltaic power installed as of 2016 was more than 1 GW over an area of 160 km^{2}, accounting for 0.42% of the power generation in Taiwan.

The government has built a photovoltaic power generation with a total power output of 189,492 kWh per year in Taiping Island, Cijin District, Kaohsiung. The project was divided into two phases, in which the first phase was completed in December 2011 and the second one in December 2014. The project was funded by the Ministry of Economic Affairs.

In May 2009, Taiwan opened the National Stadium in Zuoying District, Kaohsiung which also acts as a photovoltaic power station. It is equipped with 141 solar panels with an installed capacity of 1 MW. Currently Taipower is undergoing the first phase of photovoltaic project which will be completed by December 2014 with a total installed capacity of 19.6 MW and a production of 24.957 GWh per year. This project is expected to reduce carbon dioxide emission by 10,500 tonnes per year.

The government has a long-term plan to make the solar capacity become 4,500 MW by 2020 and to make 7.5 million Taiwan residents to utilize solar energy by 2030. To give further incentives, the government has designated solar energy and LED industries as two industries to be actively developed in the near future.

The feed-in tariff of photovoltaic energy supplied by small rooftop installations is NT$8.18/kWh and by ground-based photovoltaic installation is NT$5.62/kWh.

=== Wind energy ===
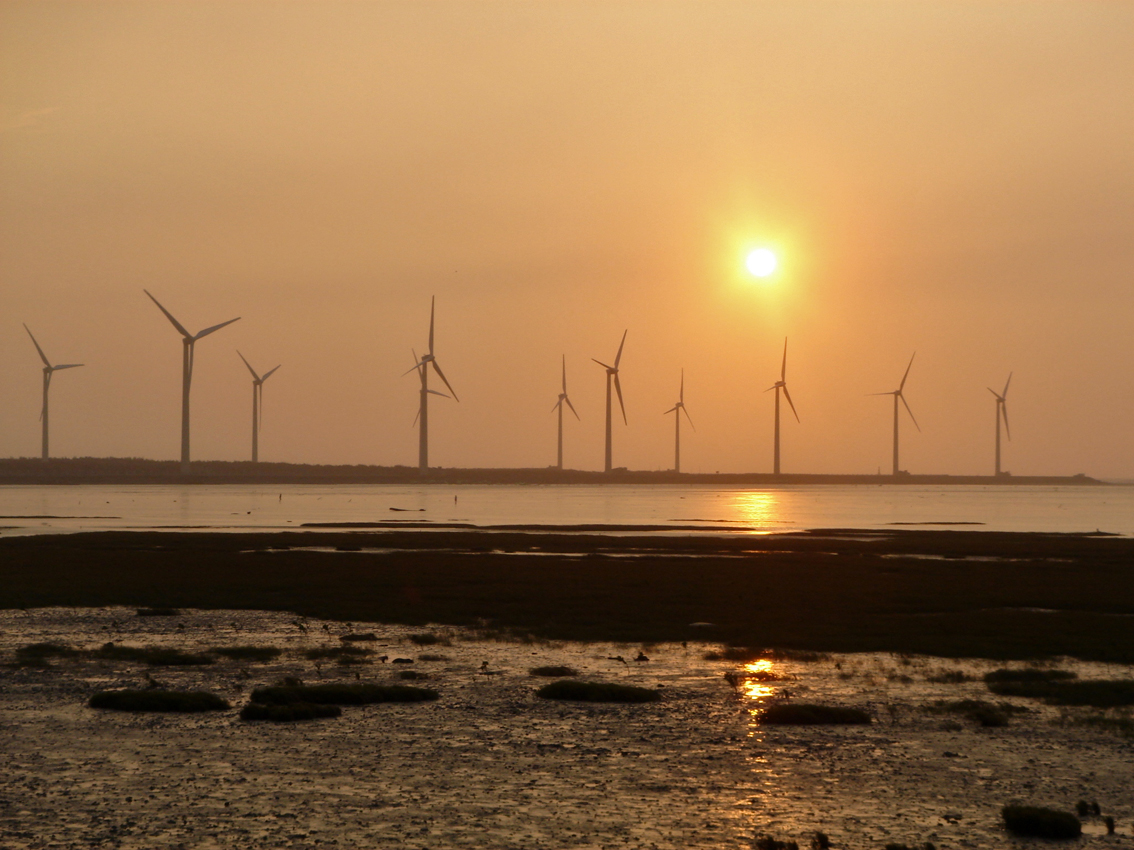
Wind farm in Gaomei Wetlands, Qingshui District, Taichung

Taiwan has abundant wind power resources. As of August 2016, there were 346 installed onshore turbines in operation with the total installed capacity of 682 MW. In 2013, Taiwan's onshore wind farm capacity factor is 28-29%, while its future offshore wind farm is 33-38%, with the total installed onshore wind capacity of 530 MW. There are currently 55 integrated and automated wind power forecasting systems established in Zhongtun, Kinmen, Mailiao, Changgong and Shihu.

The first phase of wind power installation was done in January 2003 until December 2008 in which 59 wind turbines were put into commercial operations in Shinmen, Tatan Unit 1, Guanyuan, Shianshan, Port of Taichung, Taichung Power Plant and Hengchun with a total installed capacity of 96.96 MW. The second phase was done in January 2005 until September 2011 in which 58 turbines were put into operation in Changgong Unit 1, Yunlin Mailiao, Sihu, Linko and Tatan Wind Power Stations. The third phase was done in January 2007 until July 2011 in which 28 turbines were put into operation in Changgong Unit 2, Yunlin Mailiao Unit 2, Changhua Wanggong and Tatan II Wind Power Stations with a total capacity of 59.6 MW.

The fourth phase of wind power installation is currently under construction with the expected completion schedule by June 2015 in which once completed, it will bring the total capacity of wind power to be 14.8 MW, generating 43.081 GWh per year. The Penghu Island Low-Carbon Island Wind Power Project is scheduled to be completed by the end of June 2016 with a total capacity of 33 MW, generating 116.251 GWh per year.

In 2007, the National Penghu University of Science and Technology in Penghu County started a project commissioned and funded by National Science Council to establish a 5,000 m^{2} wind park at the campus area for educational and research purposes. It now hosts 47 small, experimental turbines installed by 20 international companies. All of the turbines have their own monitoring system which record the condition and efficacy. Data is then transmitted by Internet for analysis and improvements. The government plan to construct a total of 450 onshore wind turbines and 600 offshore wind turbines by 2030, aiming at a capacity of 4,200 MW, in which 1,200 MW will be for onshore and 3,000 MW will be for offshore. Two 4 MW Siemens Wind Power offshore turbines in the "Formosa 1" project were being installed in 2016-2017, and guidelines for offshore wind developments were finalized.

Formosa 1 Offshore Wind Farm is the first offshore wind farm in Taiwan, which started commercial operation in April 2017 off the coast of Miaoli County.

=== Geothermal energy ===
Taiwan is estimated to have 33,640 MW of geothermal energy. However, the energy is largely untapped for producing electricity. The highest potential of geothermal energy are in Hualien County, Taitung County, Nantou County, Yilan County and Tatun Volcanic Group in Taipei.

The Chinese Petroleum Corporation drilled its first geothermal heat well in Yilan County in 1976. It once developed a geothermal power plant in Datong Township in 1981–1993 but it ended in failure. In August 2016, an exploration drilling for geothermal energy began in Sanxing Township, Yilan County developed by China National Petroleum Corporation, National Taiwan University and Industrial Technology Research Institute.

=== Tidal and ocean current energy ===
Due to its geography and climate Taiwan has little potential to harness tidal energy but significant potential to harness ocean current energy.

A pilot project near Green Island is underway with involvement from the Ministry of Science and Technology, National Academy of Marine Research, National Sun Yat-sen University, and Wanchi Steel Industrial Co.

== See also ==
- Energy in Taiwan
- Electricity sector in Taiwan
- Energy security
- Net Capacity Factor
- Carbon footprint
  - Kyoto Protocol
  - Paris Agreement
- Nuclear power in Taiwan
- Renewable energy debate
- Intermittent energy source
- Energy demand management
- Renewable energy by country
- Plug-in electric vehicles in Taiwan
