= Formosa 1 Offshore Wind Farm =

Wind farm in Miaoli County, Taiwan

Formosa 1 Offshore Wind Farm 海洋竹南風力發電場
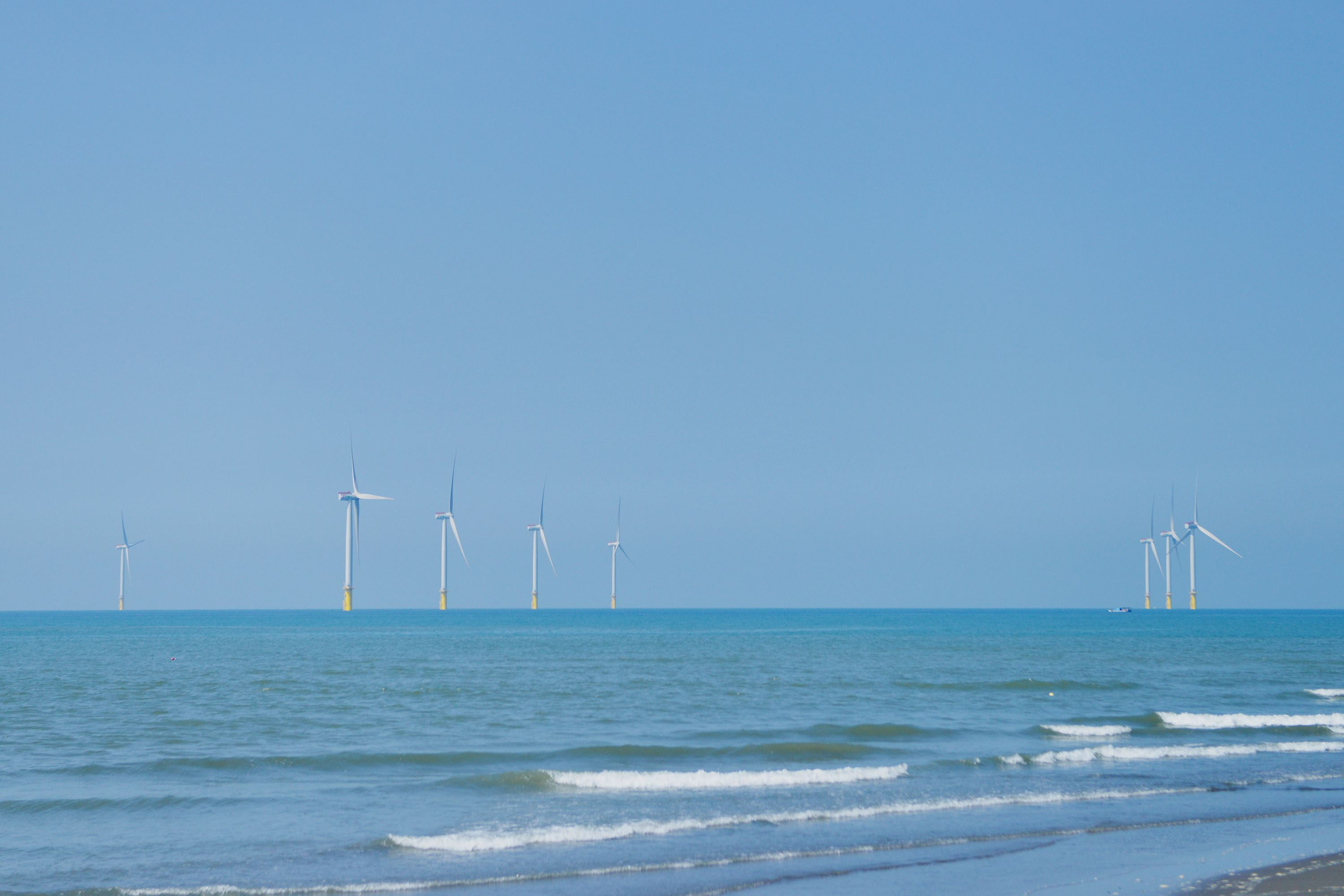
- Country: Taiwan
- Location: Miaoli County, Taiwan
- Coordinates: 24°41′27.8″N 120°48′59.3″E
- Status: Operational
- Construction began: November 2016
- Commission date: April 2017 (Phase 1); End of 2019 (Phase 2)
- Owners: Ørsted (35%); JERA (32.5%); Macquarie Capital (25%); Swancor Renewable (7.5%)

Wind farm
- Type: Offshore
- Max. water depth: 15-30 m
- Distance from shore: 6 km
- Rotor diameter: 130 m (4 MW), 154 m (6 MW)

Power generation
- Units operational: 22
- Nameplate capacity: 128 MW

External links
- Website: formosa1windpower.com/en/
- Commons: Related media on Commons

The Formosa 1 Offshore Wind Farm (traditional Chinese: 海洋竹南風力發電場; simplified Chinese: 海洋竹南风力发电场; pinyin: Hǎiyáng Zhúnán Fēnglì Fādiànchǎng) is a 128 MW offshore wind power station in Miaoli County, Taiwan. It is Taiwan's first offshore wind farm.

== History ==
The Changhua County Government signed a memorandum of understanding with Macquarie Formosa 1 and Swancor Renewable Energy in March 2017 to invest NT$210 billion to the Formosa 1 Offshore Wind Farm project. The Macquarie Group then secured funding in June 2018 for the project from local and international banks.

K2 Management was appointed as the consultant and Sinotech Engineering Consultants was appointed as the EPC contractor for the project. Sinotech then subcontracted the turbine foundation design to COWI.

The first phase of the wind turbines were installed in November 2016 and commenced operation in April 2017 with a total installed capacity of 8 MW.

The second phase of the project started in end of May 2019, expected to expand another 120 MW of electricity generations capacity. It was commissioned at the end of 2019.

== Architecture ==
The wind power station was installed 6 km offshore of Miaoli County in the Taiwan Straits over an area of 11 km^{2}.

== Technical specifications ==
The total installed capacity of the first phase is 8 MW, consists of two wind turbines from Siemens. Each turbine has a 120 m diameter rotor, 58.5 m long rotor blades and 11,300 m^{2} swept area. The turbines are installed on monopile foundations. The wind turbine performance is constantly monitored from Brande, Denmark.

Additional 20 turbines with rated capacity of 6 MW each (120 MW in total) has been installed as the Phase 2 program as of October 2019. This was commissioned at end of 2019. Each turbine foundation has a crane to hoist tools and equipment for maintenance.

== Finance ==
The wind power stations distributes the generated power to Taiwan Power Company based on feed-in tariff agreed in a power purchase agreement for 20 years. The wind farm is jointly owned by Ørsted (35%), JERA Co. (32.5%), Macquarie Capital (25%) and Swancor (7%).

== See also ==
- Renewable energy in Taiwan
- Electricity sector in Taiwan
