= CPC Corporation =

Taiwan's state-owned petrochemicals enterprise

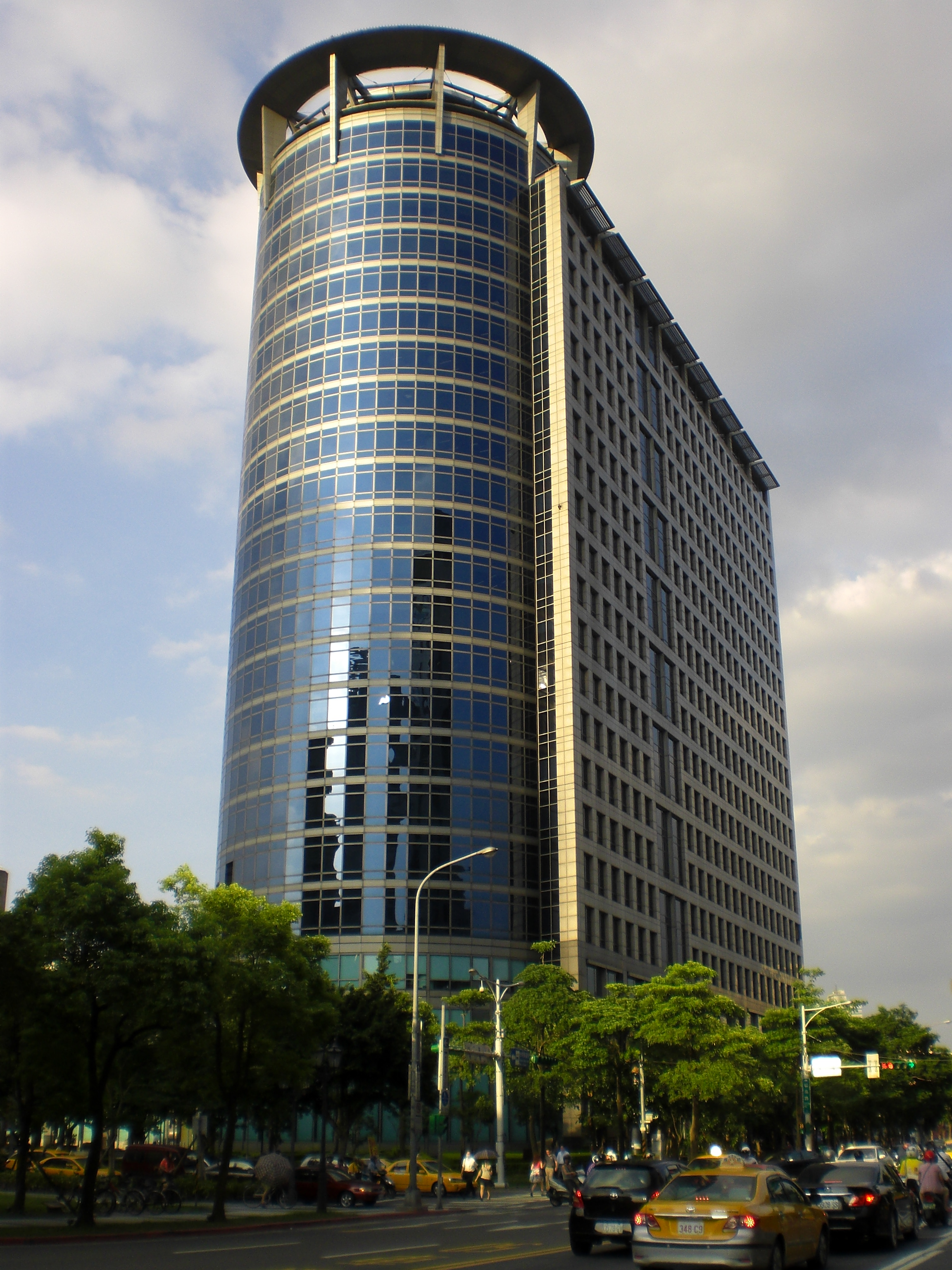
- CPC Building, Xinyi Planning District, Taipei
- Trade name: CPC
- Native name: 台灣中油股份有限公司
- Romanized name: Táiwān Zhōngyóu Gǔfèn Yǒuxiàn Gōngsī
- Type: Joint-stock company (State-owned enterprise)
- Industry: Oil and gas
- Founded: 1 June 1946; 80 years ago
- Headquarters: Kaohsiung City, Taiwan
- Key people: Tai Chein (chairman)
- Products: Petroleum; Natural gas Gasoline
- Revenue: NT$1,187.7 billion (2013)
- Number of employees: 14,787
- Parent: Ministry of Economic Affairs
- Subsidiaries: CPC Corporation, Taiwan-Libya Branch
- Website: www.cpc.com.tw/en

CPC Corporation
- Simplified Chinese: 台湾中油股份有限公司
- Traditional Chinese: 台灣中油股份有限公司
Transcriptions
Standard Mandarin
- Hanyu Pinyin: Táiwān Zhōngyóu Gǔfèn Yǒuxiàn Gōngsī

Abbreviated as
- Simplified Chinese: 台湾中油
- Traditional Chinese: 台灣中油
- Literal meaning: Taiwan Chinese Petroleum
Transcriptions
Standard Mandarin
- Hanyu Pinyin: Táiwān Zhōngyóu
Southern Min
- Hokkien POJ: Tâi-oân Tiong-iû

Locally known as
- Chinese: 中油
- Literal meaning: Chinese Petroleum
Transcriptions
Standard Mandarin
- Hanyu Pinyin: Zhōngyóu
Southern Min
- Hokkien POJ: Tiong-iû

The CPC Corporation is a state-owned petroleum, natural gas, and gasoline company in Taiwan and is the core of the Taiwanese petrochemicals industry.

== History ==
=== Early history ===
CPC was founded on 1 June 1946 in Shanghai as Chinese Petroleum Corporation (中國石油) by the government of the Republic of China (ROC, then on Mainland China). With the Kuomintang's retreat to Taiwan after the Chinese Civil War, CPC was transferred from the Council of Resources to the Ministry of Economic Affairs. The company merged all relevant facilities and companies (Japanese 6th Naval Fuel Depot, Teikoku Oil, Nippon Oil, etc.) in Taiwan. Its main businesses include surveying, extracting, refining, transporting, and selling petroleum. It also produces various chemicals and has retail outlets all over Taiwan. CPC's fixing of petrol prices helped Taiwan through the 1970s energy crisis.

=== Democratization and modern history ===
CPC held a monopoly over Taiwan's petroleum industry prior to June 1996. However, deregulation allowed the establishment of privately owned and operated petroleum refinery enterprises, leading to Formosa Plastics Group's launch of Formosa Petrochemical (台塑石化). In February 2007, the company's board approved name change to "CPC Corporation Taiwan" and the Chinese name from 中國石油 to 台灣中油. This was to avoid confusion with PetroChina, the China state-run corporation which also has the Chinese name 中國石油, and was part of government efforts to de-Sinicize Taiwanese entities which have "China" in their names. However, the Kuomintang political party argued that the name change is not valid because no legislation was passed in the legislature to support it. KMT believes that the approval of the Legislative Yuan is required before a state-owned company can change its name.

In December 2018, production started at the Prelude floating liquefied natural gas facility in Australia, which is the world's largest floating production structure. The company holds shares alongside investors Shell, Inpex Corporation, and Korea Gas Corporation.

In 2019 a Norwegian tanker named Front Altair carrying a cargo of naphtha for CPC Corporation was attacked in the Gulf of Oman. The entire NT$1.07b (US$34m) cargo was lost but the crew escaped unharmed and the cargo was insured. After insurance CPC Corporation incurred direct costs of NT$8m (US$254,000) associated with the incident. The cargo represented two days of Taiwanese consumption but had minimal impacts as the company had 45 days of supply in reserve.

In 2020 the first shipment of carbon-neutral liquified-natural gas arrived at CPC's Yung-An LNG Terminal in Kaohsiung. The shipment was the first in a new program designed to render fuel imports carbon-neutral by buying carbon credits on the global market. The initial purchase from Shell Eastern Trading was for credits certified by the UN's REDD+ program which supports forests in developing countries.

In 2020 CPC saw the first shipment of crude from the Chadian Oryx field. CPC had first begun exploration in Chad in 2006.

== Facilities ==
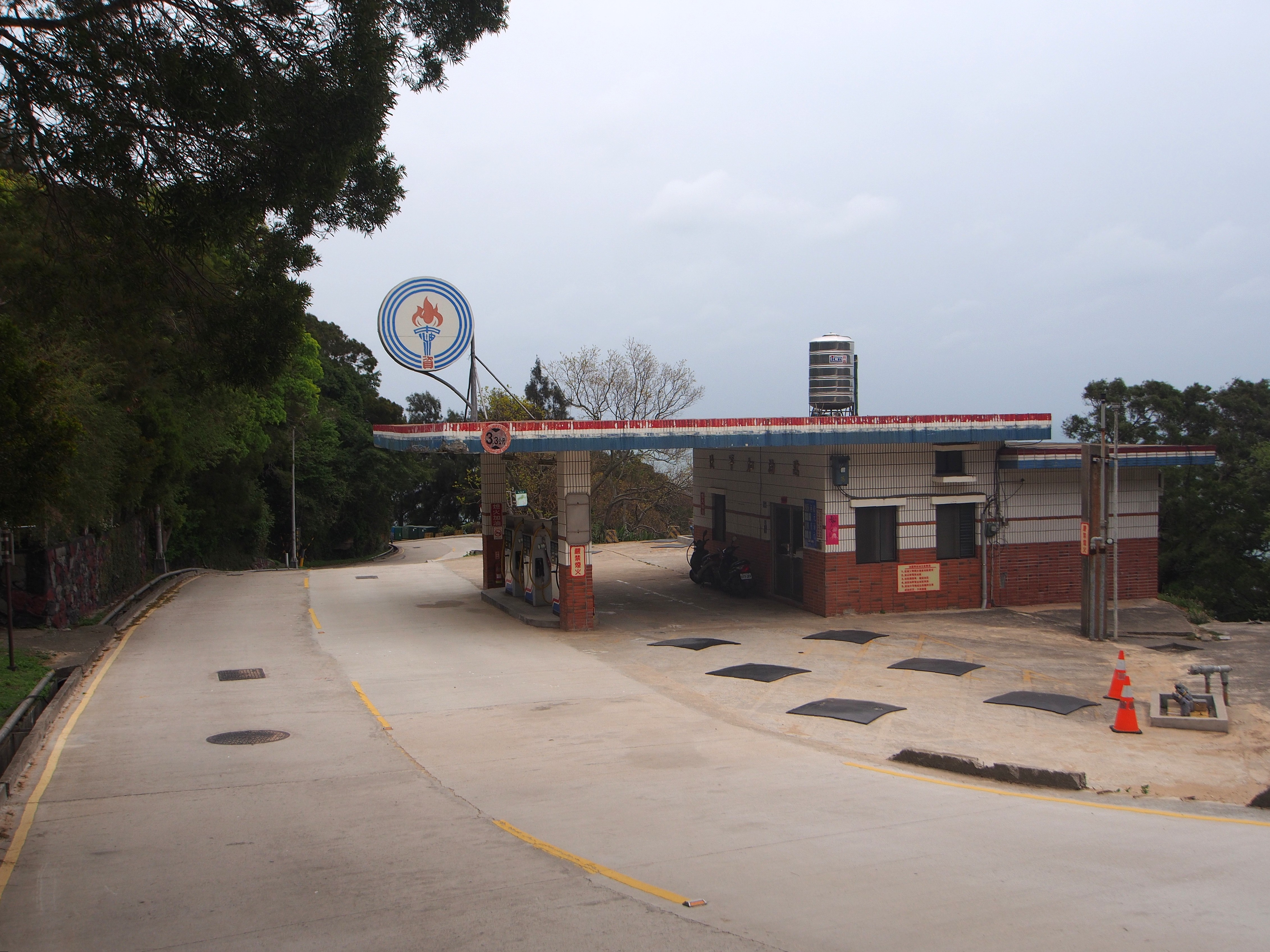
A CPC petrol station in Lienchiang County.

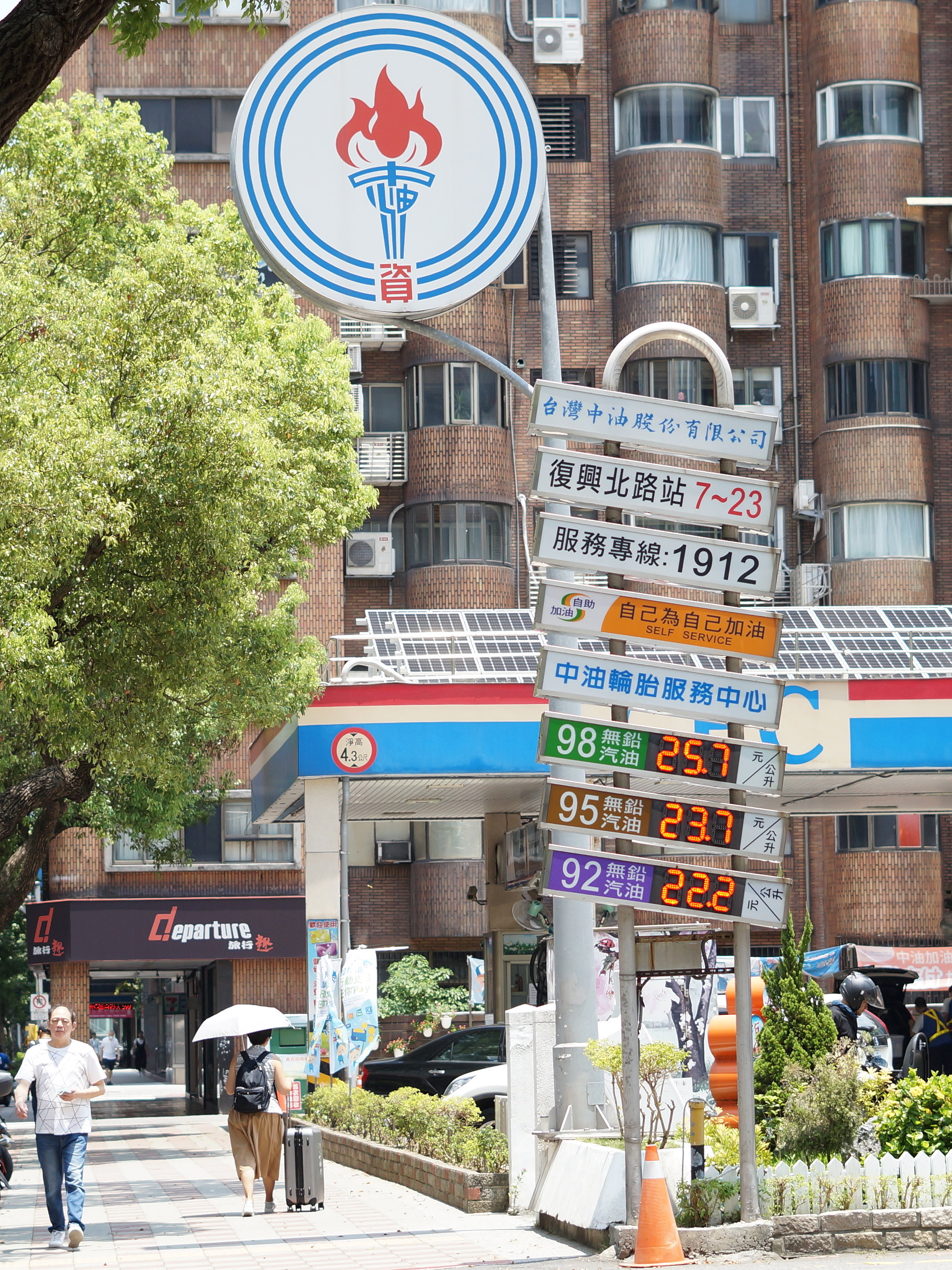
Prices outside station on Fuxing North Road (July 2020)

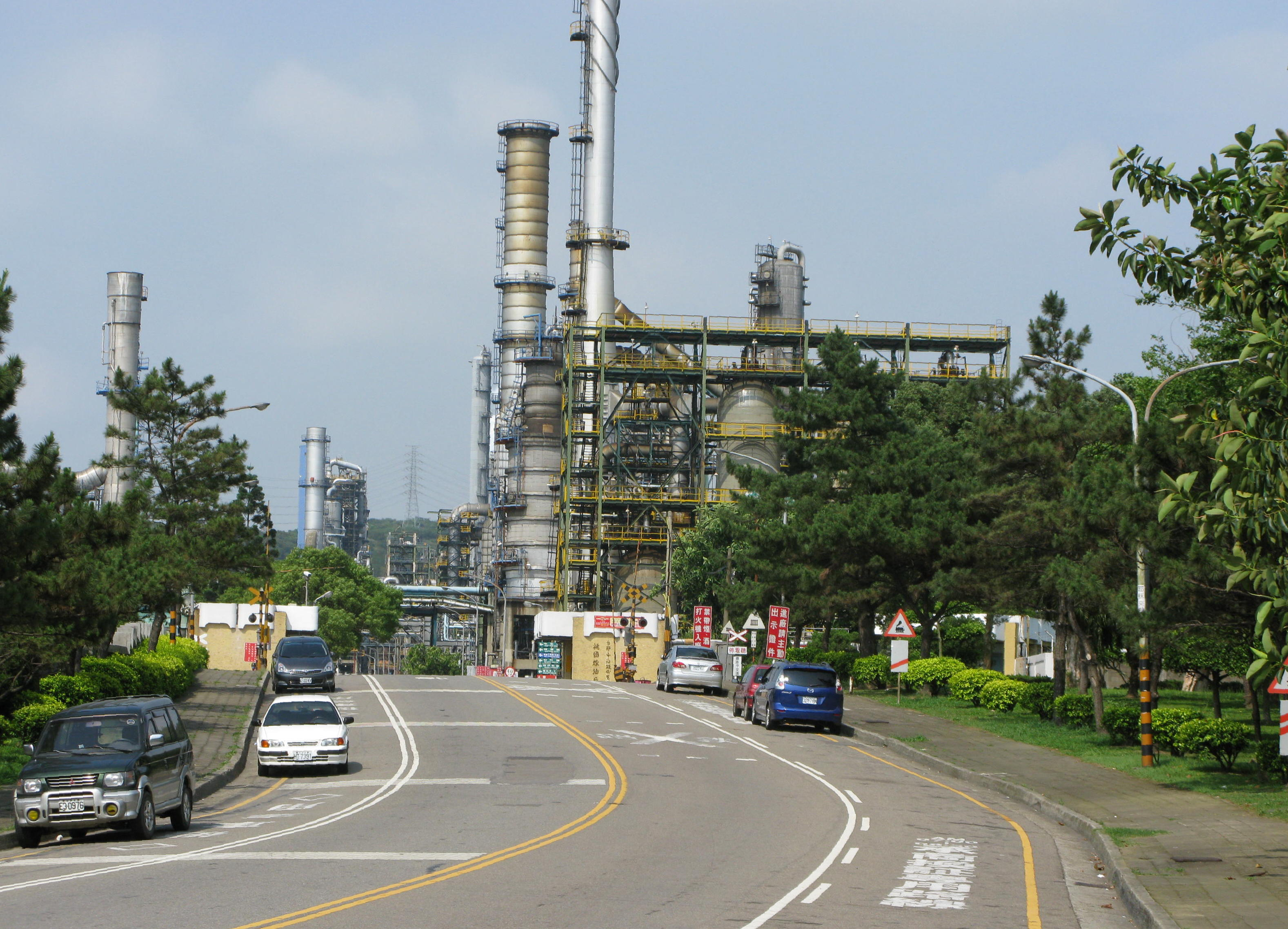
CPCC Gueishan oil refinery

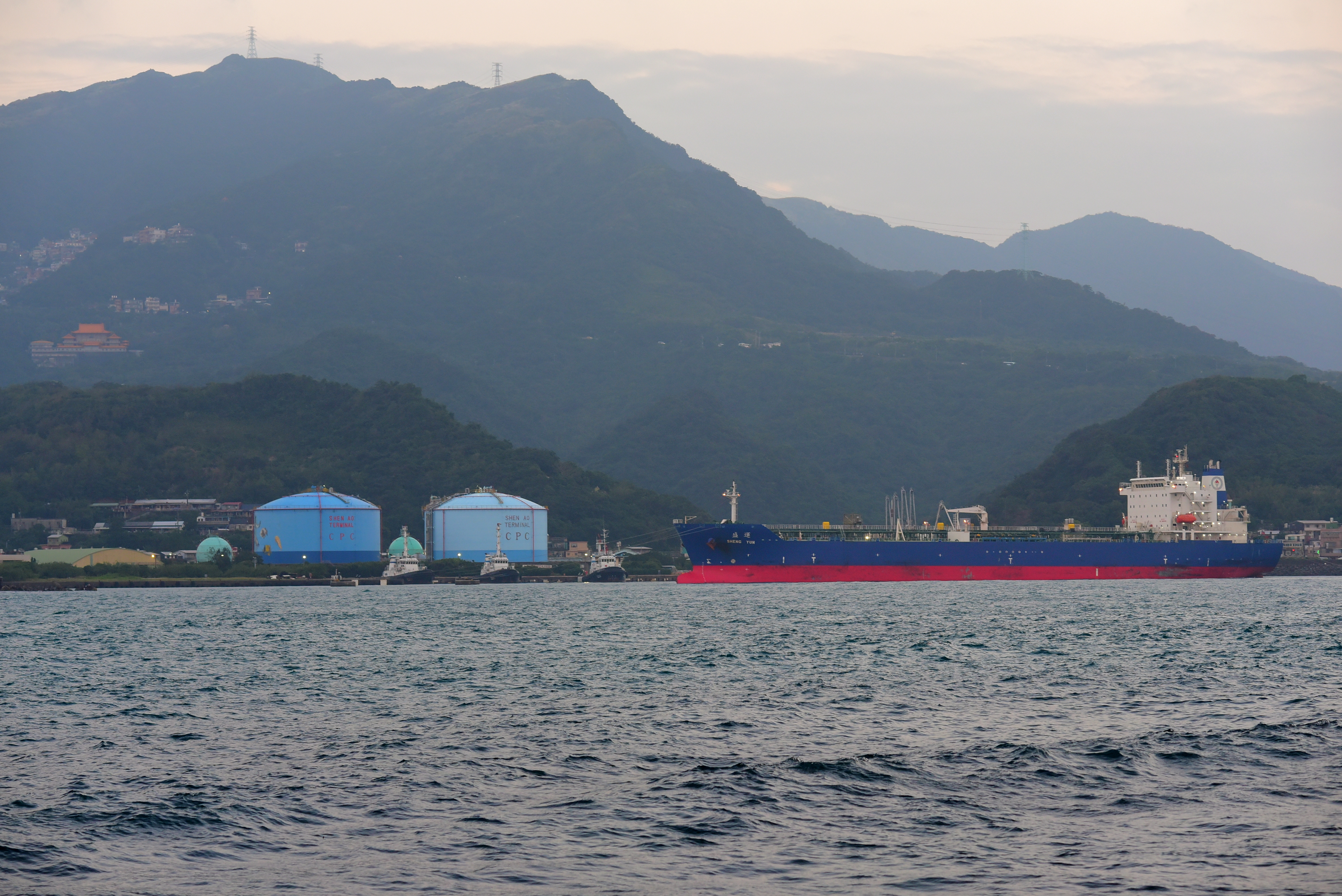
Shen'ao port in Ruifang District, New Taipei City and Sheng Yun, IMO number: 9737022

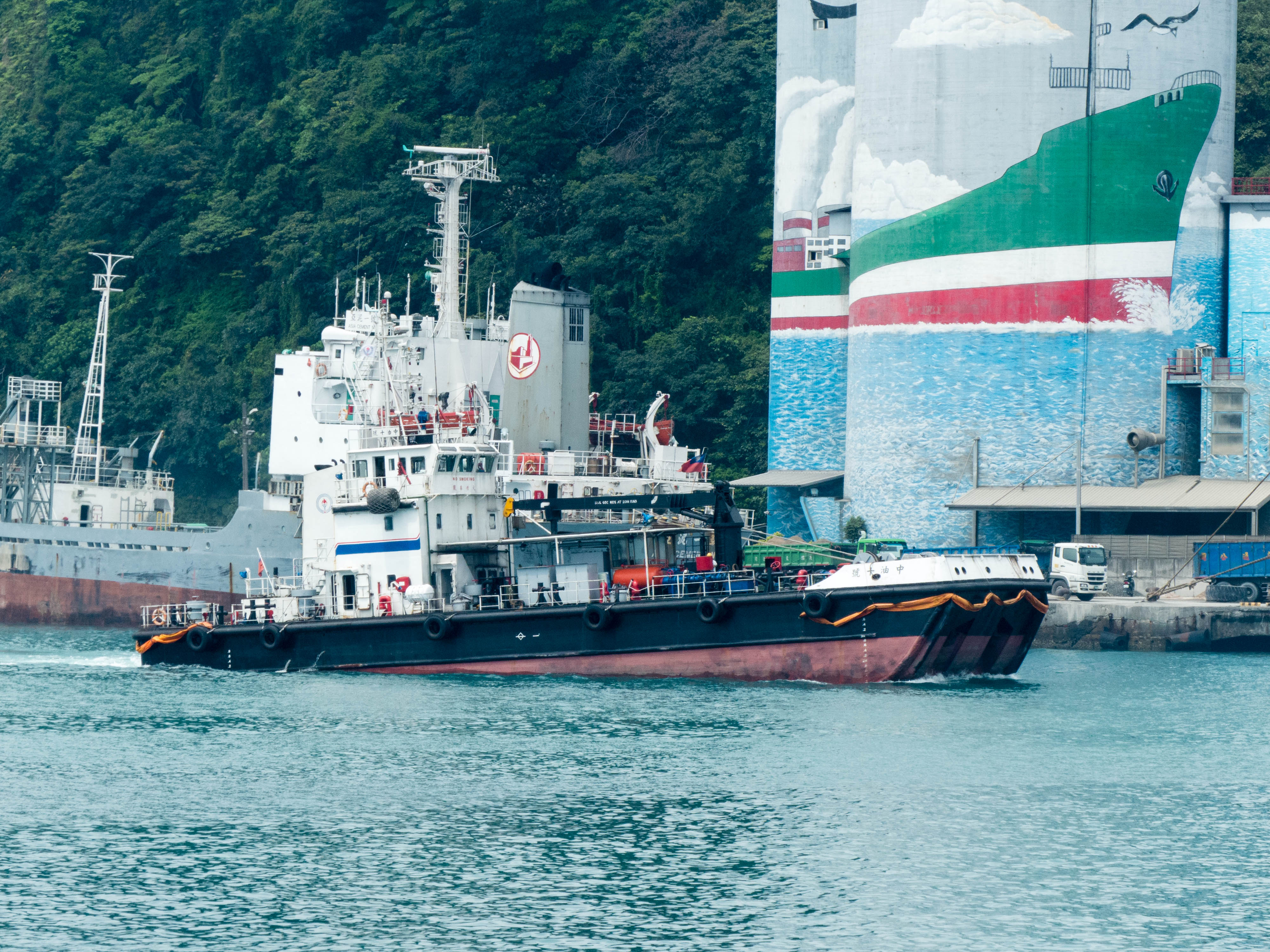
CPC No.10 fuel barge in Keelung Harbor

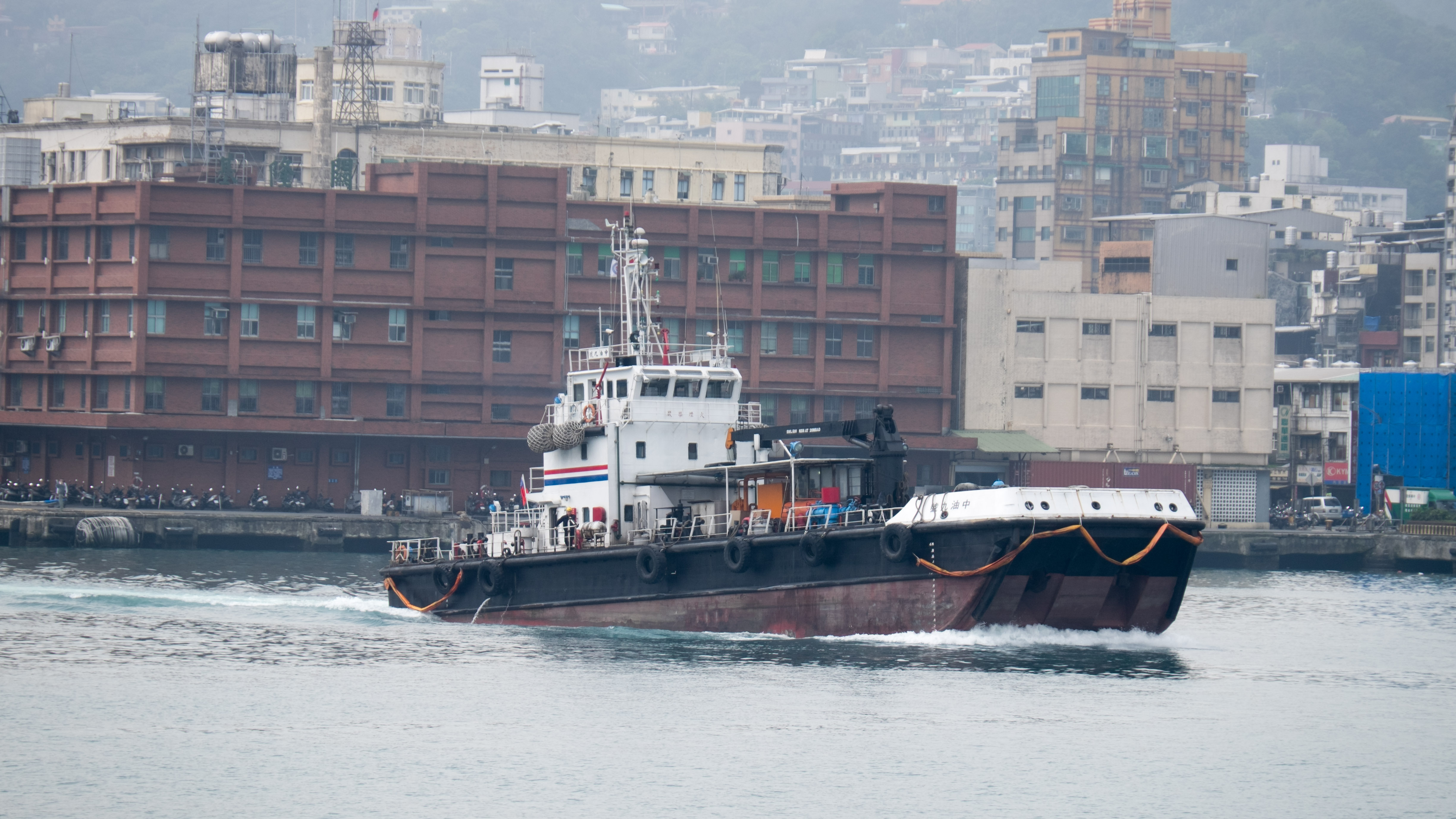
CPC No.9 fuel barge in Keelung Harbor

In 2019 CPC announced the construction of a third LNG terminal, a facility in Taoyuan expected to be completed by 2023 with an initial capacity of 1 million tonnes per year (tpy).

In 2019 CPC received approval from the Environmental Protection Administration to construct a LNG terminal in Taichung.

== Suppliers ==
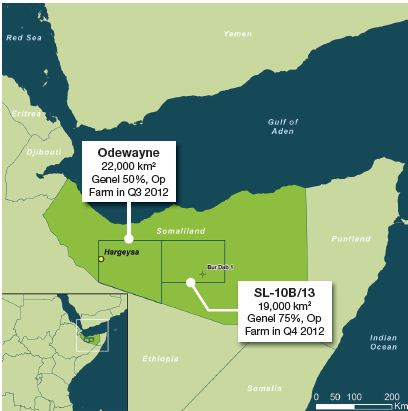
Somaliland oil blocs concession company's Genel/ CPC Taiwan, Somaliland estimates of crude oil is 30Bn, exploration and production in place for 2024-2025 with contracts with CPC Taiwan

CPC Corporation was a historic buyer of Iranian oil and received a sanctions waiver from the United States when they imposed sanctions on Iranian oil imports. Despite receiving a sanctions waiver CPC Corporation chose to end its use of Iran as a source country.

In 2018 CPC signed an agreement with American Cheniere Energy to purchase liquefied natural gas for 25 years. Deliveries are set to begin in 2021.

== Chairpersons ==
- Chen Chin-te (12 September 2016 – 18 August 2017)
- Yang Wei-fuu (30 August 2017 -) (acting)

== See also ==
- CPC Corporation F.C.
- List of companies of Taiwan
- Economy of Taiwan
- Energy in Taiwan
- Ministry of Economic Affairs (Taiwan)
- Taiwan Power Company
- Taiwan Water Corporation
