= Plug-in electric vehicles in Taiwan =

As of 2022, 3% of new cars sold in Taiwan were electric. As of November 2022, the Tesla Model 3 was the best-selling electric car in Taiwan.

== Charging stations ==
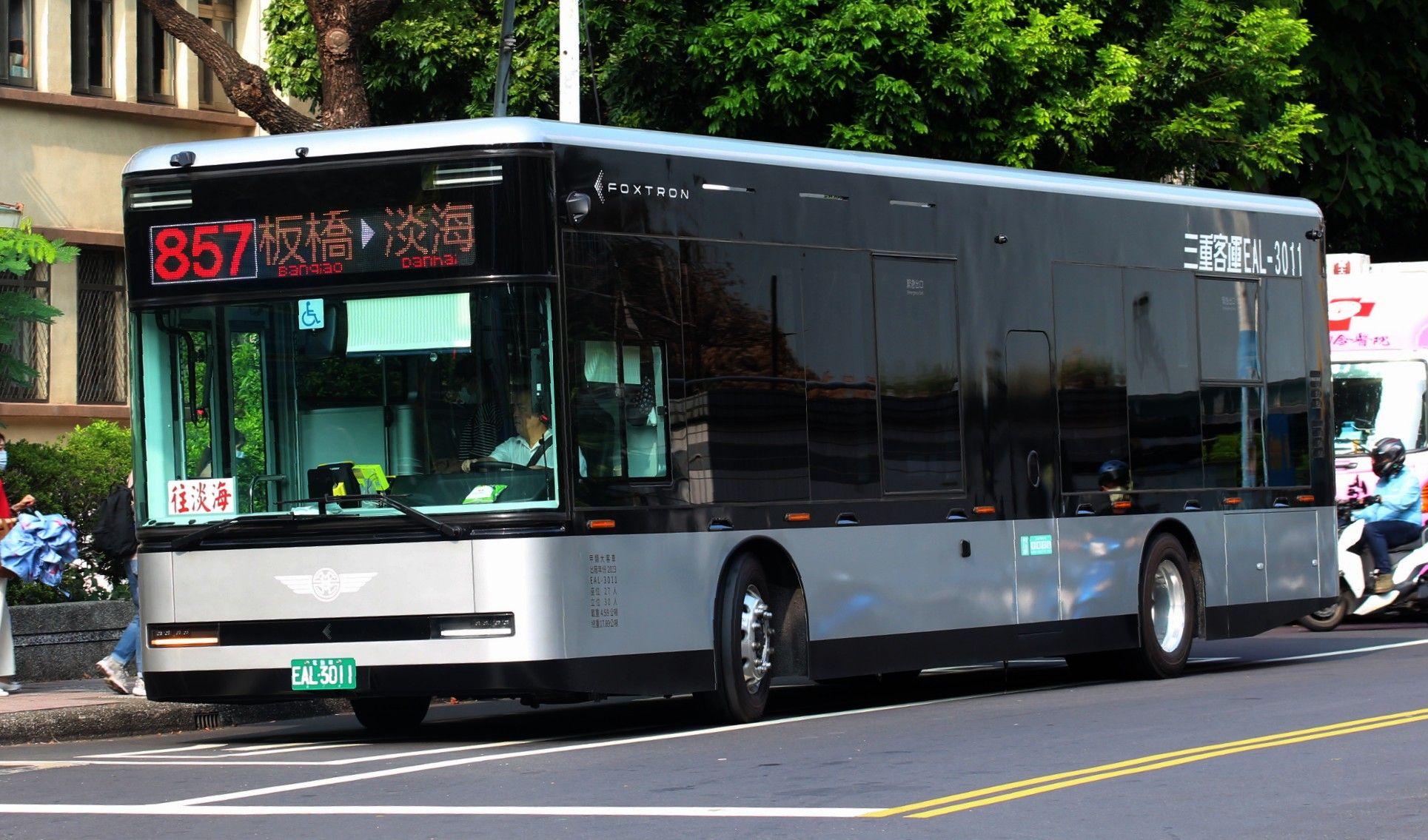
An electric bus Foxtron Model T in New Taipei.

As of 2022, there were 1,399 charging station locations with 4,380 charging ports in Taiwan.

== Manufacturing ==
Taiwan has been proposed as a hub for electric vehicle manufacturing.

== By region ==
=== New Taipei ===
As of 2022, there were 542 public charging station ports in New Taipei City.

=== Taichung ===
As of 2022, there were 685 public charging station ports in Taichung.

=== Taipei ===
As of 2022, there were 994 public charging station ports in Taipei.

== See also ==
- Energy in Taiwan
- Electricity sector in Taiwan
