= National Penghu University of Science and Technology =

University in Magong, Penghu, Taiwan

- 國立澎湖科技大學
- Motto: 新、實、謙、愛(Pe̍h-ōe-jī: Sin, si̍t, khiam, ài)
- Motto in English: Innovation, Practicality, Modesty, Love-caring
- Type: Public
- Established: 1991
- Location: Magong, Penghu, Taiwan; 23°34′32.3″N 119°34′51″E
- Website: www.npu.edu.tw/eng

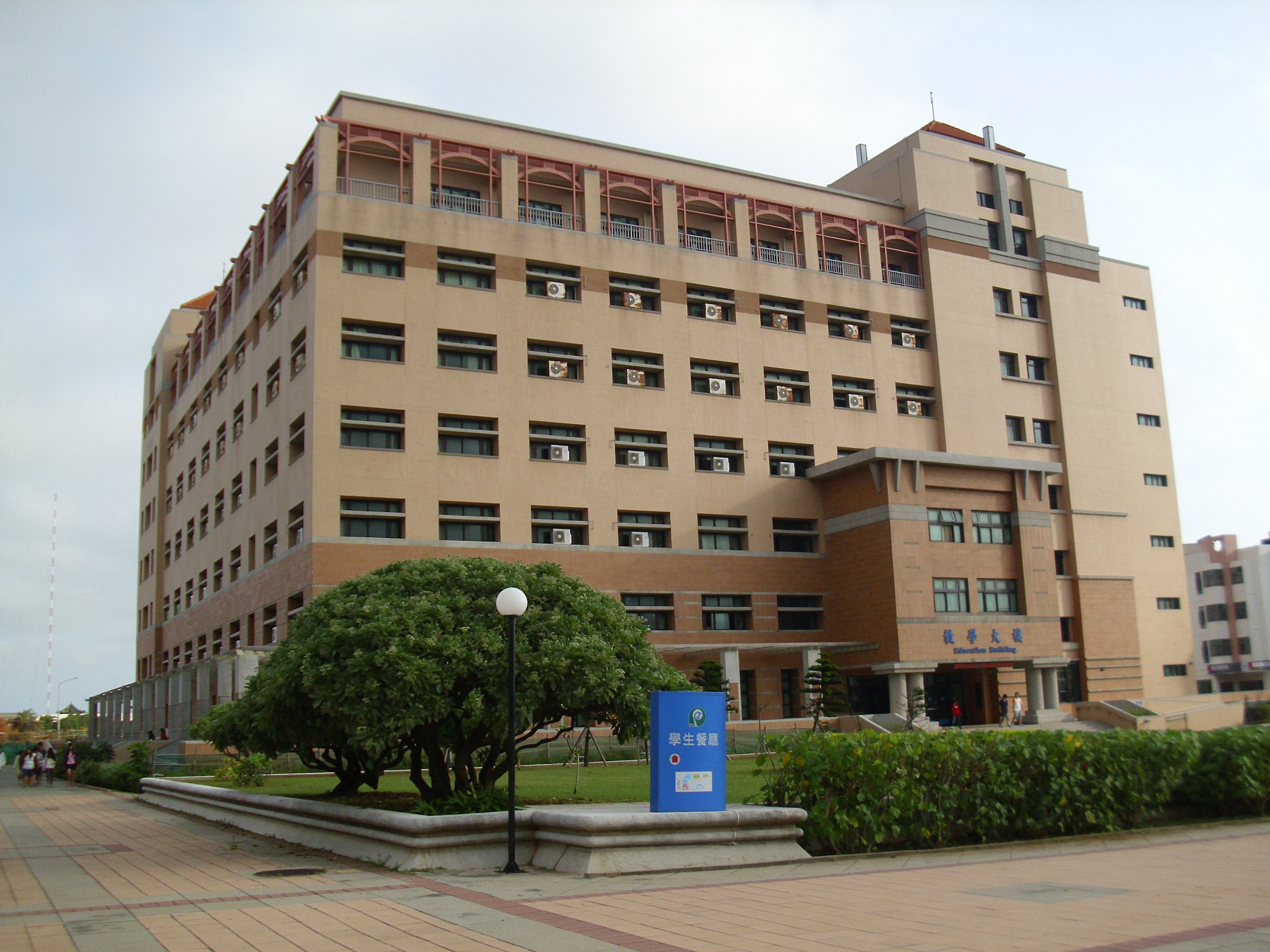

The National Penghu University of Science and Technology (NPU; Chinese: 國立澎湖科技大學; pinyin: Guólì Pēnghú Kējì Dàxué; Pe̍h-ōe-jī: Kok-li̍p Phêⁿ-ô͘ Kho-ki Tāi-ha̍k) is a public university located in Magong City, Penghu, Taiwan. It is one of the few higher education institutions located outside of Taiwan Island.

The university offers a range of undergraduate and graduate programs, including Bachelor's and Master's degrees in Marine Engineering, Naval Architecture, and Fisheries, as well as degrees in Business Administration, Tourism, and Applied Foreign Languages.

== History ==
The university was originally established in 1991 as the Penghu Branch of Kaohsiung Marine Academy. On 1 July 1995, it became an independent institution named National Penghu Marine Academy. On 1 August 2000, it was upgraded to National Penghu Institute of Technology and upgraded again on 1 August 2005 to become National Penghu University.

== Academic structure ==
=== College of Ocean Resource and Engineering ===
- The Graduate Institute of Ocean Creative Industry
- Department of Aquaculture
- Department of Food Science
- Department of Electrical Engineering
- Department of Computer Science & Information Engineering
- Department of Communication Engineering

=== College of Humanities and Management ===
- Graduate Institute of Service Management
- Department of Applied Foreign Languages
- Department of Information Management
- Department of Marketing and Logistics Management
- Department of Shipping & Transportation Management

=== College of Tourism and Leisure ===
- Department of Marine Sports and Recreation
- Department of Hospitality Management
- Department of Tourism and Leisure Management

== See also ==
- List of universities in Taiwan
