= Energy in Taiwan =

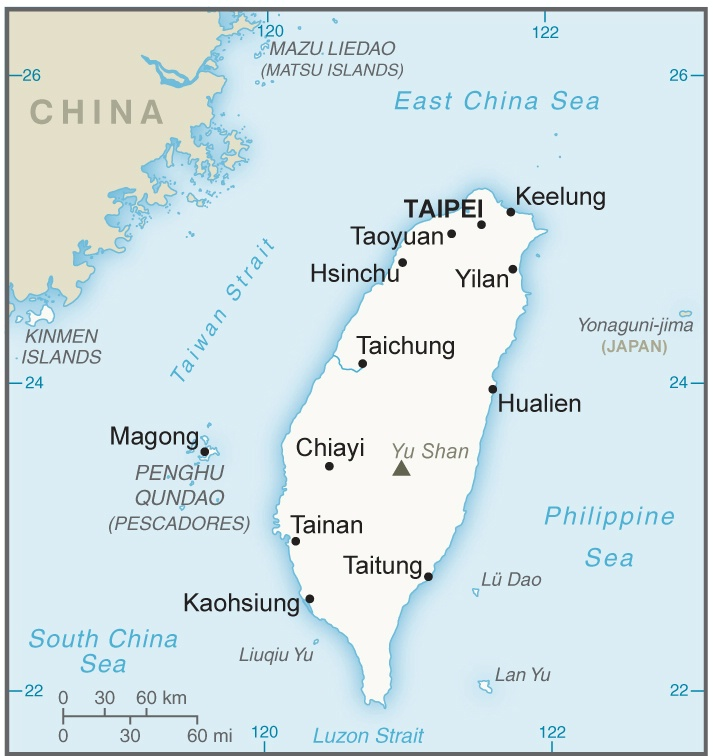
Map of Taiwan

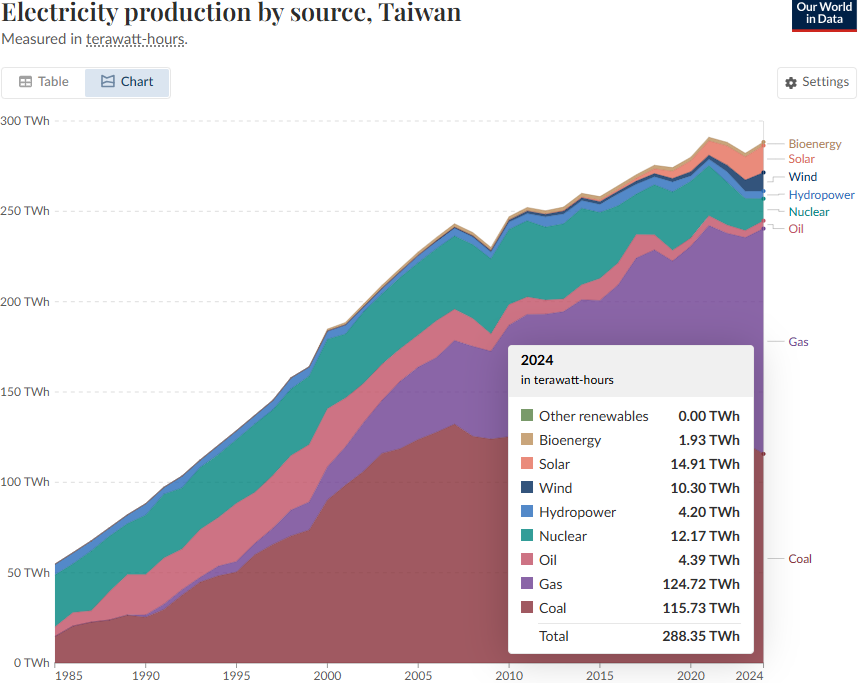
2024 TWh: Gas 124, Coal 115, Solar 15, Nuclear 12

Energy consumption by source, Taiwan

In 2024, 83.2% of Taiwan's 288 TWh electricity generation came from fossil fuels (42.4% natural gas, 39.3% coal), 4.2% from nuclear, 11.6% from renewables, and 1.1% from pumped-storage. Taiwan relies on imports for almost 98% of its energy, which leaves the island's energy supply vulnerable to external disruption. In order to reduce this dependence, the Ministry of Economic Affairs' Bureau of Energy has been actively promoting energy research at several universities since the 1990s.

== Nuclear energy ==
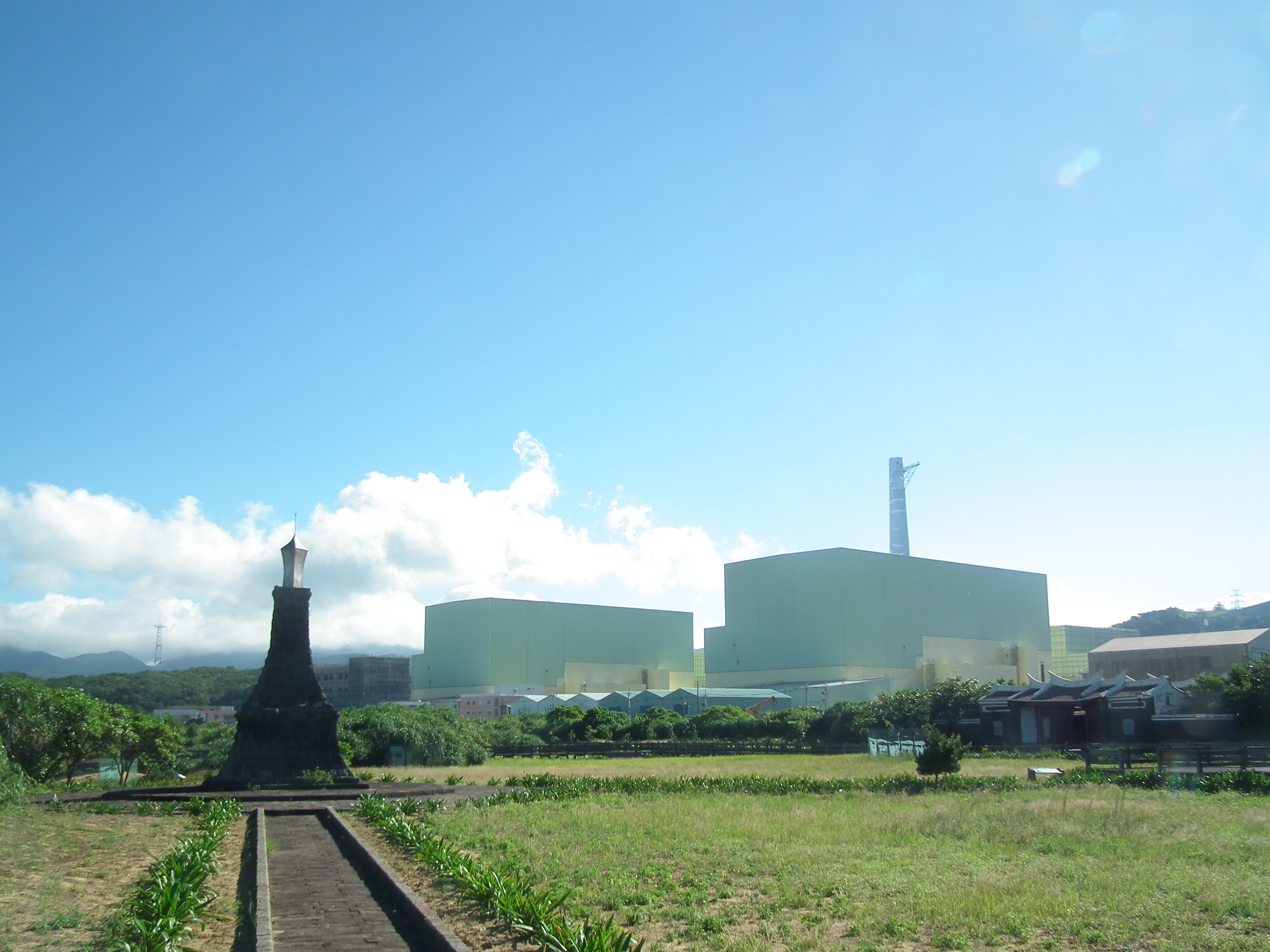
Longmen Nuclear Power Plant in Gongliao District, Taiwan.

Nuclear power plants in Taiwan (view)
Active plants
Closed plants
Unfinished plants

Nuclear power in Taiwan was part of the country's electricity production from 1977 to 2025. From 1984 on, Taiwan operated three nuclear plants with a total capacity of 5 GW. In 1985, nuclear power amounted for 52% of Taiwan's electricity production. With no further commissioned plants and increasing fossil energy generation, the share had dropped continuously to 8% in 2017. In 2023, nuclear energy made up 6.3 percent of Taiwan's generated electricity. The technology chosen for the reactors has been General Electric BWR technology for the Jinshan and Kuosheng plants, and Westinghouse PWR technology for the Maanshan Nuclear Power Plant.

Taiwan has not experienced any nuclear accident, but a power outage at Maanshan unit 1 in 2001 was classified as an INES 3 incident. Nevertheless, the fear that an earthquake could cause the release of radioactivity led to an anti-nuclear movement that eventually prevented the commissioning of Lungmen, the fourth constructed plant, in April 2014, despite its modern ABWR design. Active seismic faults run across the island, and anti-nuclear environmentalists argue Taiwan is unsuited for nuclear plants. A 2011 report by the Natural Resources Defense Council, an environmental advocacy group, evaluated the seismic hazard to reactors worldwide, as determined by the Global Seismic Hazard Assessment Program data, placed all of Taiwan's reactors within the highest risk group of 12 reactors within very high seismic hazard areas, along with some of Japan's reactors.

The 2016 presidential and legislative elections were won by a party whose key platform promises included phasing out nuclear power. In a 2018 referendum, voters adopted a proposal to retain nuclear power; however, in January 2019, the government stated that it would not extend the life of existing plants or restart construction on Lungmen. Another referendum in 2021 proposing to restart the construction of the Lungmen Nuclear Power Plant was rejected. As of May 18, 2025, Taiwan completed the phase-out of nuclear power, shutting down their final nuclear reactor at Maanshan Power Plant. An unsuccessful referendum in 2025 considered restarting operations at Maanshan, which had closed earlier that year. On 24 September 2026, the Taiwan Nuclear Safety Commission approved a preliminary plan for the restart of both units at Maanshan, despite the failed 2025 referendum.

Taiwan’s energy transition has caused concern about the country's long-term energy security. As of 2024, imports make up over 97% of Taiwan’s energy needs. Public opinion on nuclear energy in Taiwan remains relatively divided. In 2021, a national referendum rejected a proposal to restart construction at the Lungmen (Fourth Nuclear) plant. In 2025, polling from the Taiwanese Public Opinion Foundation found that 73.6 percent of respondents supported the extension of nuclear power plant operations, reflecting changing attitudes amid energy concerns.

Taiwan has taken a significant step towards restarting its Maanshan nuclear power plant after the Nuclear Safety Commission completed its review of Taiwan Power Company’s restart plan, submitted in March 2026. However, the completion of the review does not constitute final authorization to resume operations as further inspections, technical assessments and regulatory approvals are still required. Ultimately, the decision will also depend on the outcome of a referendum scheduled for later in 2026 on abolishing Taiwan’s “nuclear-free homeland” policy. The move marks a renewed effort to reintroduce nuclear power into Taiwan’s energy mix.

== Liquefied natural gas ==
The annual output of liquefied natural gas (LNG) from exploration and production within Taiwan is 350-400 million m^{3}. While on the other hand, Taiwan imported 18.4 billion m^{3} of LNG, the fifth largest LNG importer in the world, primarily from Qatar, Malaysia and Indonesia. LNG-fired power plants in Taiwan produce electricity at a cost of NT$3.91/kWh, more than the electricity cost charged to the customers.

The Democratic Progressive Party Government of the Republic of China under Chen Shui-bian was elected in early 2000 promising to approve only liquefied natural gas power projects in the future, and to increase the share of liquefied natural gas of Taiwan's power generation to roughly one-third by 2010. President Chen's administration tried to stop the 2,600 MW Longmen Nuclear Power Plant, currently under construction, but a court has ruled the construction could not be aborted.

In January 2013, China National Offshore Oil Corporation (CNOOC) and Shinfox signed an agreement to supply Kinmen with liquefied natural gas (LNG) from Mainland China. The delivery of LNG is expected to be started in early 2015 to industrial companies. At a later stage, the supply will be increased up to 100,000 tonnes per year to include power plants and households. The agreement was witnessed by Minister of Environmental Protection Administration Stephen Shen. Shen said that the cooperation is helpful to help Taiwan in realizing Kinmen to be a tourism-focused low-carbon county. During the third Cross-Strait Entrepreneurs Summit in Nanjing on 2–3 November 2015, executives from CNOOC and Shinfox gave a briefing on the joint venture project. Under the cooperation framework, CNOOC facilities in Fujian will also supply compressed natural gas, along with production technology.

As of 2017, the safety stock of LNG imported to Taiwan is seven days. In 2017 Taiwan was the world's fifth largest importer of LNG accounting for 6% of global market share.

A case study related to LNG in Taiwan occurred in 2021 when a proposed LNG receiving station was planned to be built on Taoyuan’s Datan algal reef. The project to build this station was backed up by the DPP, despite typically siding with environmentalists, while the oppositional party (KMT) worked with environmental groups to protest this construction. In December 2021, the proposed referendum to relocate the receiving station failed, but the DPP maintains that the station has avoided impacts on the algae reef habitat. The DPP supported LNG because their energy plan includes more LNG to substitute their zero nuclear energy plan.

== Renewable energy ==
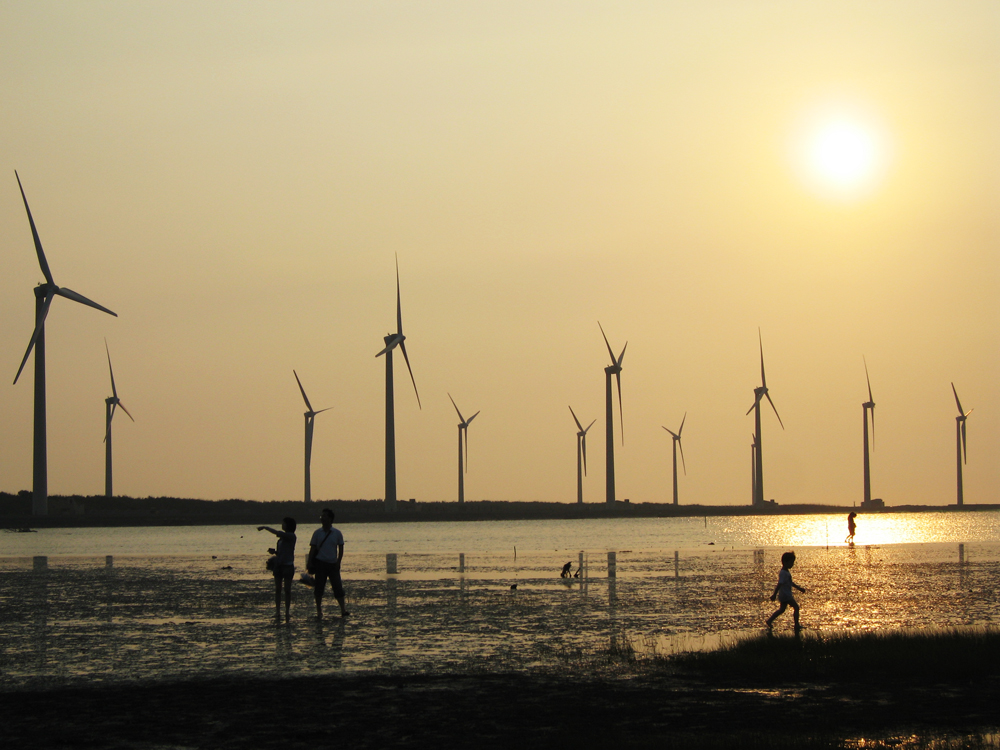
Wind farms in Qingshui, Taichung.

In June 2009, the Legislative Yuan passed a renewable energy act aimed at promoting the use of renewable energy, boosting energy diversification and helping reduce greenhouse gases. The new law authorizes the government to enhance incentives for the development of renewable energy via a variety of methods, including the acquisition mechanism, incentives for demonstration projects, and the loosening of regulatory restrictions in order to increase Taiwan's renewable energy generation capacity by 6.5 gigawatts to 10 gigawatts within 20 years.

In July 2009, the Executive Yuan approved a proposal consisting of 16 measures to transform Taiwan into a “low carbon” country by 2020. The Ministry of Economic Affairs’ (MOEA) proposal set a long-term goal of cutting total annual greenhouse gas emissions to 2000 levels by the year 2025. The Executive Yuan also requested the legislature to complete a bill on reducing carbon emissions and another bill on developing renewable energy. NT$226 million will be used to promote renewable energy and facilities in homes and public buildings. Over the next five years NT$20 billion would be invested into advanced technologies in seven industries: solar energy, LED lighting, wind power, hydrogen energy and fuel cells, biofuel, energy information and communications technology and electric vehicles. Cooperation between local governments and the central government will be enhanced by providing incentives for conserving energy and cutting emissions. Two pilot communities will be created per county or city over 2009-2011, with 50 percent of the energy supply in those areas coming from renewable sources.

In August 2009, Taiwan's government has announced that it will invest T$45 billion ($1.4 billion) in the island's domestic renewable energy sector in an attempt to help the sector grow nearly eight-fold by 2015 thereby increasing industry production value to T$1.158 trillion in 2015 compared to T$160.3 billion in mid-2009. Proponents hope that "the green energy sector will help Taiwan become a major power in energy technology and production, as well as provide the creation of green jobs."

In May 2016 Economics Minister Lee Shih-guang stated that the government expects renewable energy to account for 20% of electricity generation by 2025, to support the government's ambition to phase out nuclear power generation.

== Emissions ==
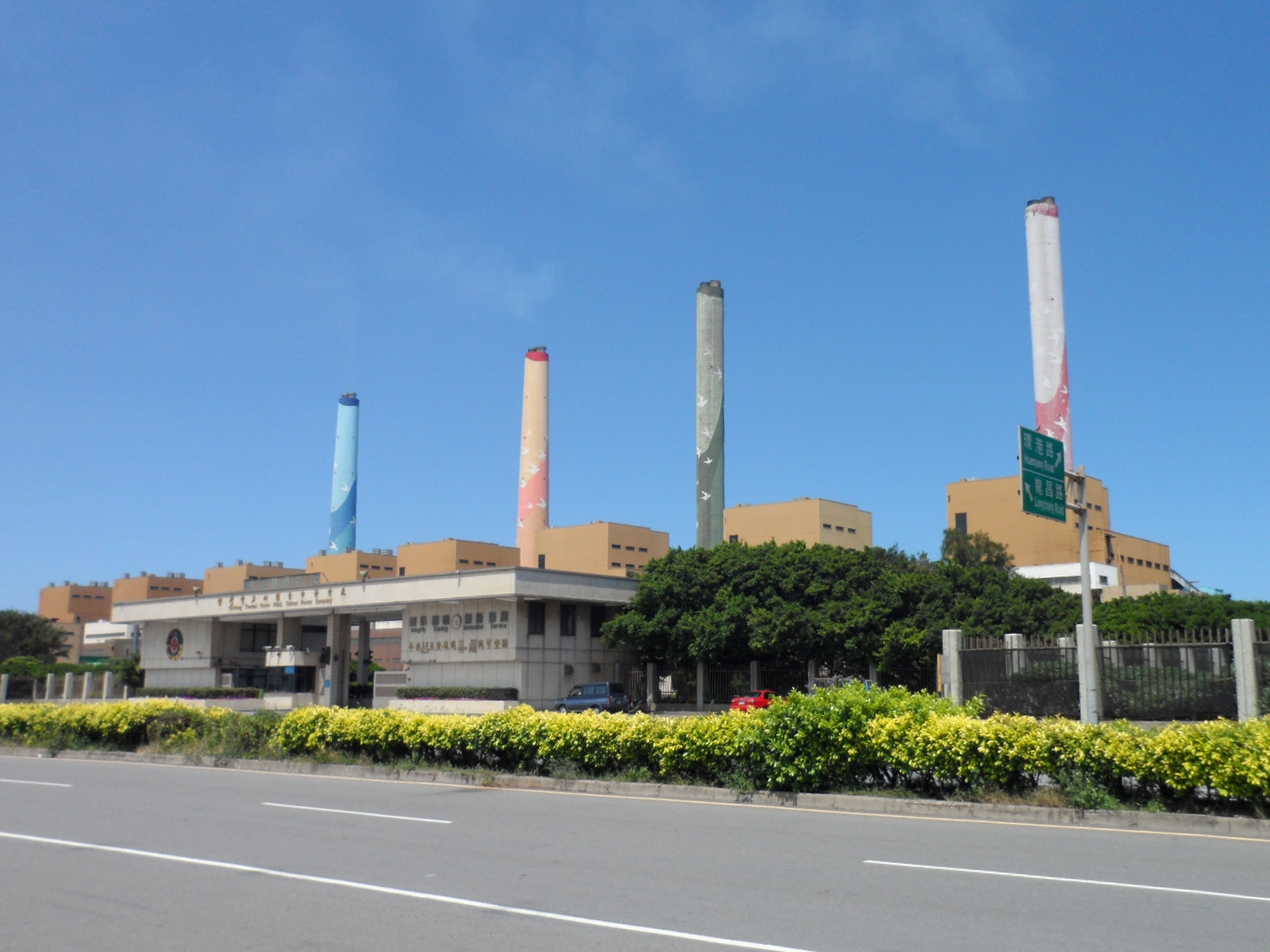
Taichung Power Plant, world's fourth largest coal-fired power plant.

Total carbon dioxide emissions nationwide were 277.645 million tonnes in 2006, representing 124.68 percent growth over 1990's 123.574 million tonnes, according to the Environmental Protection Administration (EPA). Energy conversion industry contributed to 6.9 percent of emissions in 2006, while heavy industry contributed 52.5 percent, the transportation sector contributed 14.3 percent, the commercial sector 6.3 percent and private households 12.1 percent.

Taiwan ranked third in Asia and 32nd worldwide in the 2009 Climate Change Performance Index (CCPI) for carbon dioxide emissions, published by Climate Action Network Europe (CAN-Europe) and Germanwatch. In 2025, Taiwan ranked 60th in the CCPI and received a “very low” rating in Energy Use and GHG emissions.

In 2022, Taiwan officially announced their plan to have net-zero emissions by 2050, including a plan to get there. The four transition strategies Taiwan has included in their plan are transitions in the energy, industrial, lifestyle, and social sectors. In February 2023, Taiwan’s president Tsai Ing-wen announced the revision of the Greenhouse Gas Management Act as the Climate Change Response Act, incorporating net-zero by 2050 sentiments.

== Historical energy consumption ==
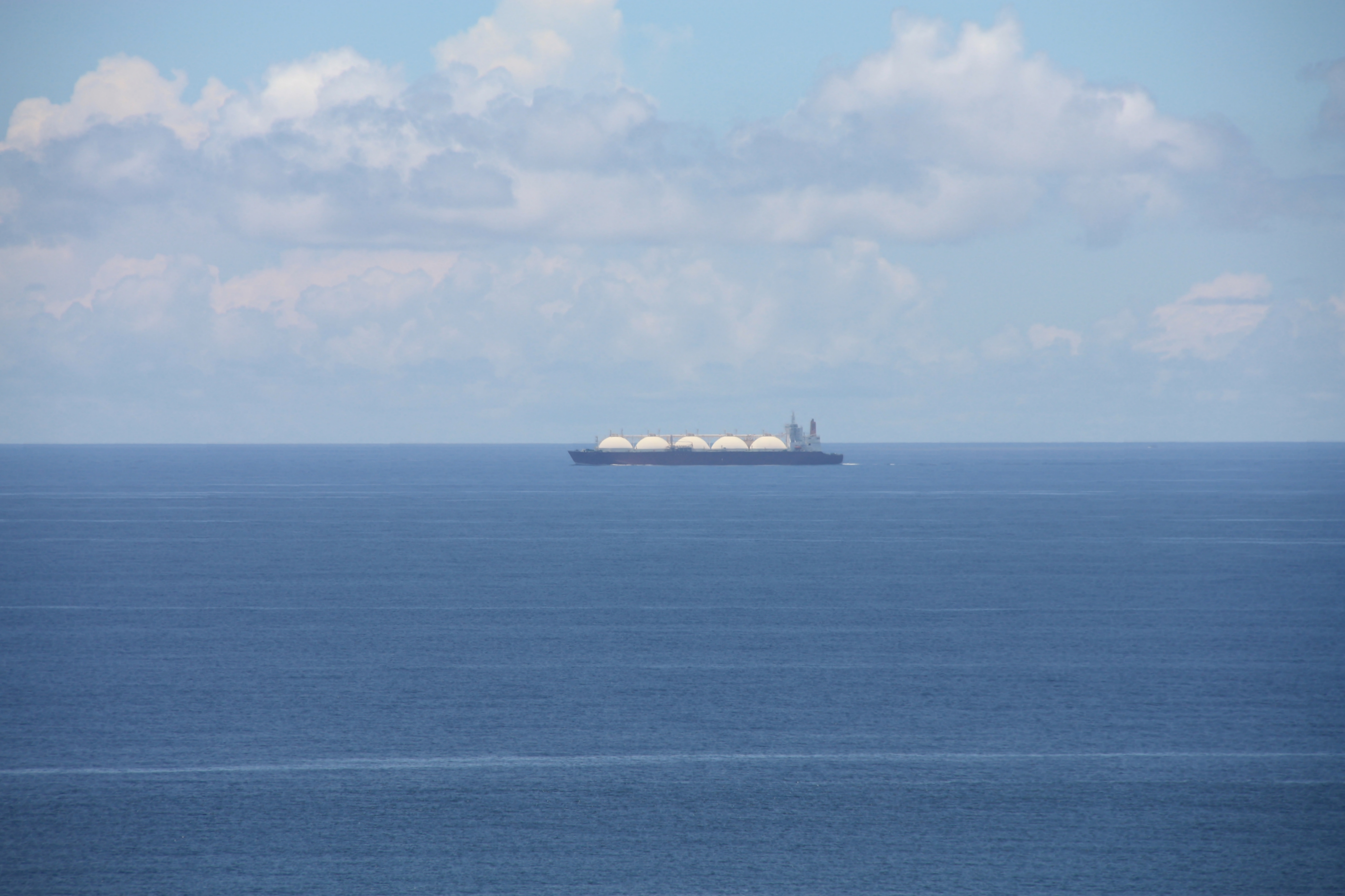
LPG tanker off of Pingtung coast

Taiwan produces electricity from fossil fuels, wind, nuclear and hydro power. Taiwan's energy consumption is the equivalent of 10.5 million kiloliters of oil, or about 2.2 million barrels a day.

Consumption of petroleum products account for about half of Taiwan's energy supply equivalent of 4.5 million kiloliters of oil. Demand for diesel declined 21 percent, while that for gasoline dropped 8.7 percent. Monthly Power consumption is around 20.9 billion kilowatt-hours. Formosa Petrochemical Corp. and CPC Corp are Taiwan's only oil refiners.

Energy use in the first six months of the year rose 6.7 percent to the equivalent of 61.6 million kiloliters of oil, the energy bureau said.

Crude oil processing: 4.59 million kiloliters in June.

Coal imports: 5.23 million metric tons

Imports of crude oil: 26.9 million kiloliters

[LNG] purchases: 5.58 billion cubic meters. Purchases of liquefied natural gas increased 13 percent to 1.06 billion cubic meters. LNG accounted for 97 percent of gas supply.

In 2013, coal imports to Taiwan amounted 65.96 million tons, which consists of 58.96 million tons of steam coal and 7.02 million tons of coking coal. The largest coal exporter country to Taiwan is Indonesia (41.64%) and Australia (40.20%).

In 2018, oil accounted for 48.28% of the total energy consumption. Coal comes next with 29.38%, followed by natural gas (indigenous and liquefied) with 15.18%, nuclear energy with 5.38%, biomass and waste with 1.13%, and energy from other renewable sources (plus hydroelectric power) with 0.64%.

In 2020, 45% of Taiwan's electricity generation came from coal, 35.7% from natural gas, 11.2% from nuclear, and 5.4% from renewables.

In 2024, about 12% of Taiwan’s power came from renewable energy, 47% from natural gas, 4.7% from nuclear, and 31% from coal.

== Energy efficiency ==
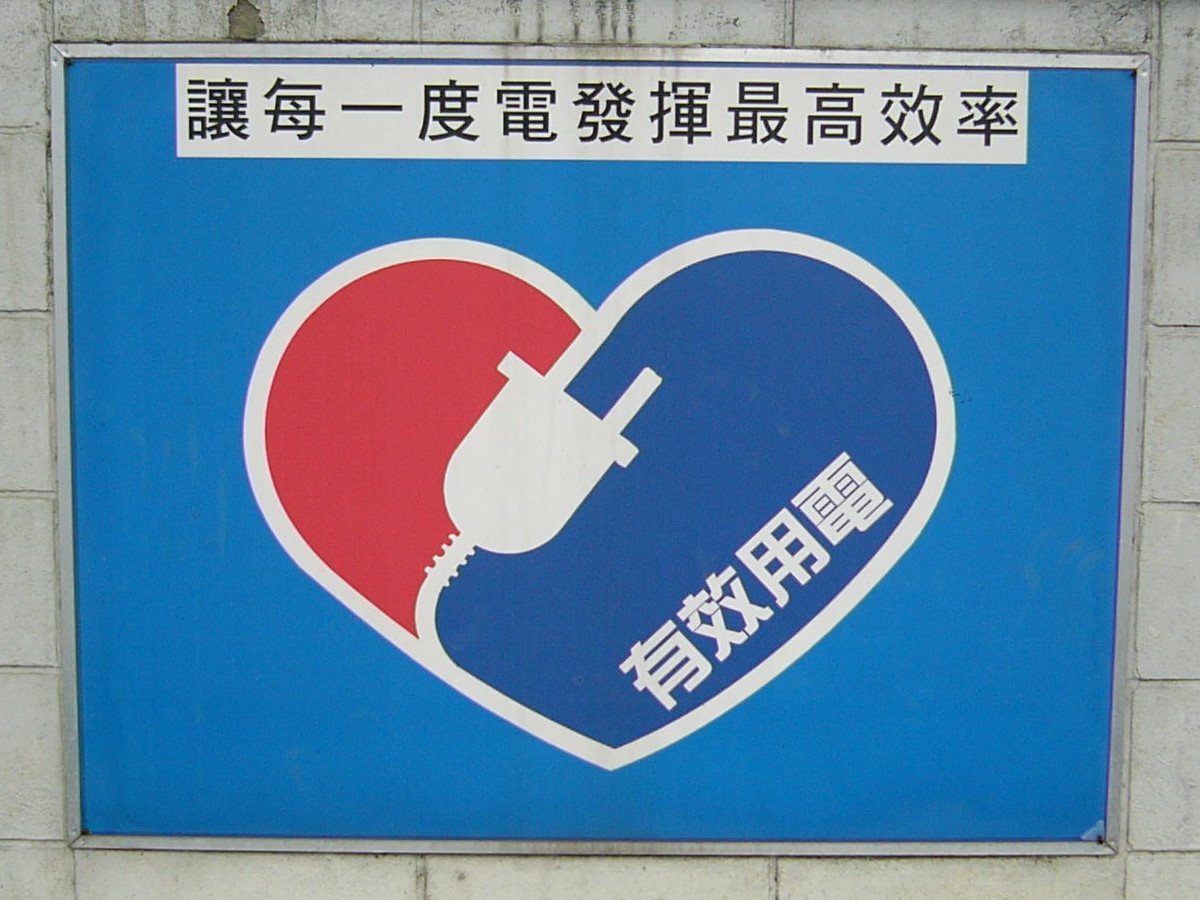
Efficient-Usage of Electricity Logo by Taipower

The Taiwan government has been active in promoting energy efficiency, and set a target of energy efficiency of 33% by 2025. This target is higher than Japan's commitment to APEC with the target of 25%-26% efficiency. The government is currently assisting 200 major energy users (companies and organizations) in implementing energy-saving measures.

Taiwan is preparing for the age of high oil prices, and is proactively developing clean energy, such as solar and wind power and biofuels. The efforts would help reduce Taiwan's reliance on imported oil, while contributing to the reduction of greenhouse gases.

The government aims for renewable energy to account for 15% of the nation's energy by 2025. It would amount to 8.45 million kilowatts, capable of producing 28.7 billion kilowatt hours of electricity. Wind-generated power could create as much as 8.9 billion kilowatt hours of electricity by 2025, comparable to 2.3 times the capacity of Linkou's thermal power plants. Many domestic companies are now beginning to work on the development of solar energy, and conservative estimates are projecting that 1.2 billion kilowatt hours of electricity will be produced through solar power by 2025.

Under the Energy Management Law and the underlying Implementing Regulations and related measures, companies are encouraged to improve the energy efficiency of their operations and products. Mandatory programs have been established for the purpose of energy conservation, including energy audit and energy efficiency standards for certain electrical and electronic products.

The Energy Commission under the Ministry of Economic Affairs is responsible for formulating and implementing energy policy and laws, including the programs instituted under the Energy Management Law. The principal responsibilities of the Energy Commission include:

1. supervising general affairs related to energy management to assure the stability of energy supply;
2. accelerating the rationalization of energy pricing;
3. promoting the effectiveness of energy utilization;
4. preventing energy-related environmental pollution; and
5. enhancing energy research and development.

The day-to-day work of the Energy Commission involves activities such as the development of policies and regulations, planning and conservation, research and development of technology, and data collection, processing, and publication.

Through the Greenmark program set up by the Fundamentals for Promoting the Use of the Taiwan Ecolabel, a number of energy-using appliances have been granted Ecolabels. For the electronic products, energy efficiency is one of the most important criteria for granting Green Marks. For further details, refer to the section on packaging and labeling. The Statute for Upgrading Industries also provides incentives for the improvement of energy efficiency.

== Energy research ==
The Center for Energy Research (CER) at National Central University has initiated a plan to educate energy professionals. It would coordinate professors from related disciplines and attempt to build a diversified teaching platform to recruit young students and researchers. The center focuses on training students in green technology and supporting research into new product development.

- Energy Technology and Management Research Center at National Chiao Tung University
- CER at National Central University
- New Energy Research Center at National Taiwan University

Currently there are four nuclear research centers in Taiwan ranging up to 2.8 MW.

According to reports by National Cheng Kung University, Taiwan is in need of stepping up its pace in fusion power research if it wishes to develop more sources of "clean" energy.

== See also ==
- List of power stations in Taiwan
- Taiwan Power Company
- Economy of Taiwan
- Electricity sector in Taiwan
- Nuclear power in Taiwan
- Renewable energy in Taiwan
- Ministry of Science and Technology (Taiwan)
