= Hsieh Shou-shing =

Taiwanese nuclear engineer (born 1950)

- 謝曉星
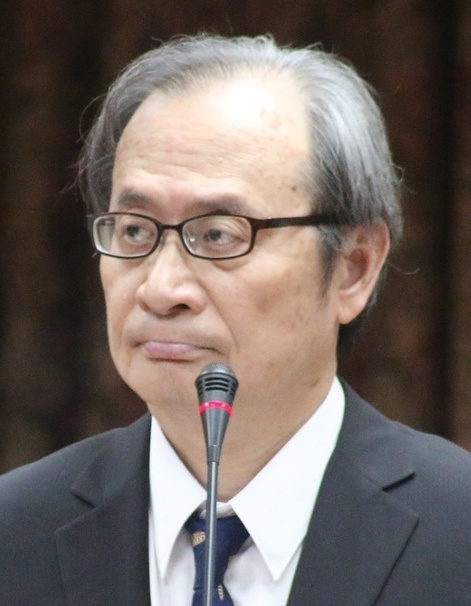

Minister of Atomic Energy Council of the Republic of China
- In office 20 May 2016 – 11 January 2023
- Deputy: Tsai Huei-min, Huang Tsing-tung, Chiu Tzu-tsung, Chang Ching-wen, Liu Wen-chung
- Preceded by: Chou Yuan-chin
- Succeeded by: Chang Ching-wen

Personal details
- Born: 8 December 1950 (age 75) Hsinchu City, Taiwan
- Education: Tatung Institute of Technology (BS); National Taiwan University (MS); Drexel University (MS); Ohio State University (MS, PhD)
- Scientific career
- Fields: Nuclear engineering
- Thesis: A study of turbulent heat transfer on rough surfaces in a square duct with asymmetrical heating applicable to nuclear waste repository configurations (1983)
- Doctoral advisor: Richard N. Christensen

Hsieh Shou-shing (traditional Chinese: 謝曉星; simplified Chinese: 谢晓星; pinyin: Xiè Xiǎoxīng; born 8 December 1950) is a Taiwanese nuclear engineer who served as minister of the Atomic Energy Council from 20 May 2016 to his removal from office on 11 January 2023.

== Early life and education ==
Hsieh was born in Hsinchu on December 8, 1950. He graduated with a Bachelor of Science (B.S.) in mechanical engineering from the Tatung Institute of Technology in 1973 and earned his master's degree in mechanical engineering from National Taiwan University in 1978. He then completed graduate studies in the United States, where he earned a second master's degree in mechanical engineering from Drexel University in 1980 and a third master's degree and then his Ph.D. from Ohio State University (OSU) in 1981 and 1983, respectively, in mechanical engineering and nuclear engineering.

As a graduate student at OSU, Hsieh was a research associate in its nuclear engineering program. His doctoral dissertation, completed under professor Richard N. Christensen, was titled, "A study of turbulent heat transfer on rough surfaces in a square duct with asymmetrical heating applicable to nuclear waste repository configurations".

== Academic career ==
Hsieh returned to Taiwan in 1984, to join the National Sun Yat-Sen University faculty, where he was promoted to full professor in 1989. Hsieh chaired the department of mechanical engineering between 1990 and 1996, when he was named dean of engineering. He held the deanship until 2002. Hsieh is an emeritus National Chair Professor, as designated by the Ministry of Education, and held the Distinguished Chair Professorship from 2011 to 2017.

While he taught at NSYSU, Hsieh was elected a fellow of the American Society of Mechanical Engineers in 1995.

== Political career ==
Hsieh was named minister of the Atomic Energy Council in April 2016, and took office on 20 May, with other members of the Executive Yuan formed by Lin Chuan. Shortly after assuming their ministerial posts, Hsieh and economic affairs minister Lee Chih-kung were sued by anti-nuclear activists, after Lee had proposed reactivating the first reactor at the Jinshan Nuclear Power Plant. The reactor had been shut down since December 2014, during the ministerial tenure of Tsai Chuen-horng. At the time the plant was decommissioned, Taipower was unable to remove as many spent fuel rods as planned, due to storage limits. Activists filed a separate lawsuit against premier Lin Chuan. In response to allegations that the AEC's previous actions had favored Taipower, Hsieh vowed to increase the council's transparency and invite public participation. In June 2017, Hsieh was questioned about plans to convert the loading pools at Guosheng Nuclear Power Plant to fuel storage sites. Hsieh retained his role when William Lai became premier. In November 2017, Hsieh reported to the Legislative Yuan about the AEC's plans to decommission three nuclear power plants, and subsequently convert them to geothermal power plants.

In March 2018, Hsieh announced the imminent restart of the second reactor at Guosheng, which had been closed since May 2016, due to a glitch in its electrical grid. He repeatedly reiterated the government's intent to phase out nuclear power by 2025, as well, but was called to devise an updated policy alongside the Ministry of Economic Affairs when a proposal to repeal a related article in the Electricity Act was adopted during the 2018 Taiwanese referendum. In 2019, Hsieh described proposals to activate the Lungmen Nuclear Power Plant as impractical for budgetary and seismological reasons, and continued reporting on efforts to send fuel rods meant for the plant back to the United States. In 2021, the Japanese government stated that it would begin releasing treated wastewater from the Fukushima Daiichi Nuclear Power Plant into the ocean. Taiwan's representative to Taiwan, Frank Hsieh, faced calls to report to the legislature and be recalled from or resign his post. Following the Japanese announcement, the AEC sent a number of Taiwanese researchers to investigate wastewater discharged from Daiichi. Hsieh Shou-shing planned to send a Taiwanese delegation and government funds to participate in a United Nations mission to review Daiichi wastewater discharge. The AEC also considered starting a fund to compensate Taiwanese fishers affected by contaminated wastewater.

In October 2022, Mirror Media reported on allegations of physical and verbal harassment against Hsieh, who was duly placed under investigation by the Executive Yuan, and granted leave in December. Following the end of the investigation, Hsieh was removed from office on 11 January 2023. In July 2023, the Control Yuan voted unanimously to impeach Hsieh. The Disciplinary Court fined Hsieh NT$600,000 for disregarding COVID-19 pandemic regulations, and instances of sexual harassment, sex-based discrimination, and workplace bullying.
