= Low-Level Radioactive Waste Storage Site =

Nuclear waste storage facility in Lanyu, Taitung County, Taiwan

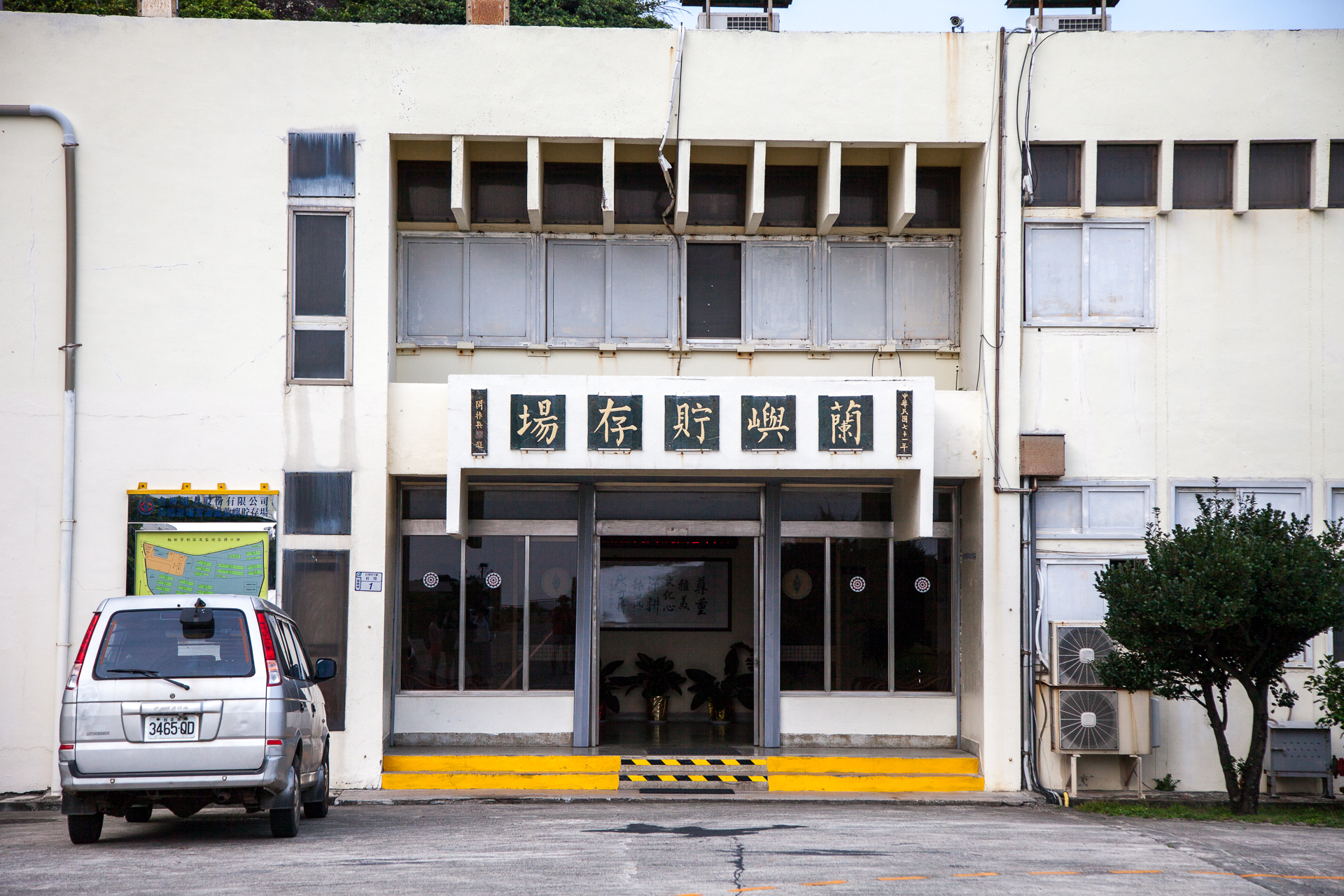
- Interactive map of the Low-Level Radioactive Waste Storage Site area

General information
- Type: nuclear waste storage facility
- Location: Lanyu, Taitung County, Taiwan
- Coordinates: 22°00′17″N 121°35′40″E
- Completed: 1980
- Owner: Taiwan Power Company

The Low-Level Radioactive Waste Storage Site, formerly Lanyu Storage Site (traditional Chinese: 蘭嶼貯存場; simplified Chinese: 兰屿贮存场; pinyin: Lányǔ Zhùcún Chǎng), is a facility to store all of the nuclear waste produced by three nuclear power plants in the Republic of China in Lanyu Island, Taitung County. It is owned and operated by Taipower.

== History ==
In the early 1970s, the Atomic Energy Council (AEC) formed a task group to search for sites as a temporary storage facility for mid and low-level nuclear waste. The decision to choose Long Men area of Lanyu Island as the storage site was made in 1974. The Executive Yuan (EY) approved the construction plan of the site at the end of 1975. The construction of the facility commenced by building a harbor in 1978 and later the storage in 1980 named Lanyu Storage Site. The site was then managed by Office of Radioactive Waste Management of AEC. First shipment carrying nuclear waste arrived in May 1982. After accepting 97,672 low-level radioactive waste drums, it stopped accepting the waste in February 1996, in which 86,380 drums came from nuclear power plants around Taiwan and 11,292 drums came from various sources. In July 1990, Taiwan Power Company took over the management of the site according to the Radwaste Management Policy issued by EY. On 19 June 2018, the site was renamed Low-Level Radioactive Waste Storage Site.

== Location ==
The facility was built at the South Eastern tip of Lanyu Island. It faces the Pacific Ocean in one direction, and the other three directions face hills behind it, thus separating the facility from the residence by natural barriers.

== Design ==
The layout of the storage trenches was designed to the surrounding topography and ground water table. The height of the trench is 4.5 meters, with 3 meters underground and 1.5 meter above the ground. At the bottom of the trench, 5 cm of concrete and 40 cm of reinforced concrete were laid in sequence.

== Functions ==
The facility receives low-level radioactive solid waste from nuclear power plants, medical, agriculture, industrial, education and research sectors about 45,000 barrels annually, which is being shipped by boat from Taiwan Island every week.

== Safety ==
Taipower claims that several safety measures are taken to ensure the safety of the facility. Wastes are tested and examined before being stored at the facility, transportation and storage are done under strict control, thorough investigation and examination are done to the environment surrounding the facility, and changes in the radioactivity level are strictly monitored.

== Controversy ==
=== Canning factory theory ===
According to Lin Xin-yu, an elderly member from the Jivalino tribe of Lanyu, when the government decided to build a radioactive waste storage site in Longmen, it deceived local residents by calling it a canned fish factory. According to Mei-lan Xia-tian, a guide from the same tribe, the government did not inform residents that toxic nuclear waste were to be stored on the site. Instead, they pretended to build a pineapple factory to boost the local economy. Elderly people in the tribe gave written consent without being able to read Chinese.

However, the Atomic Energy Council pointed out that right from the beginning the Lanyu project never used the term "canning factory" to cover up the establishment of a storage site. When the project was reported to the Executive Yuan, and when coordinating the planning of the storage site with the Taiwan Provincial Government, the Taitung County Government and other agencies, the building of a "national radioactive material storage site of Lanyu" was clearly indicated. In addition, the site in Longmen had a large notice board announcing the construction project name and indicating it was a nuclear waste storage site.

== See also ==
- List of power stations in Taiwan
- Nuclear power in Taiwan
