= Huang Tsing-tung =

Taiwanese nuclear scientist

- 黃慶東

Deputy Minister of Atomic Energy Council of the Republic of China
- In office 2007–2007
- Minister: Su Shian-jang; Tsai Chuen-horng; Chou Yuan-chin; Hsieh Shou-shing
- Succeeded by: Chiu Tzu-tsung

Personal details
- Born: 1951 (age 74–75)
- Education: National Tsing Hua University (BS, MS); Massachusetts Institute of Technology (DSc)

Huang Tsing-tung (Chinese: 黃慶東; pinyin: Huáng Qìngdōng; born 1951) is a Taiwanese nuclear scientist. He was the Deputy Minister of the Atomic Energy Council of the Executive Yuan in 2007.

== Education ==
Huang graduated from National Tsing Hua University with a bachelor's degree in nuclear engineering in 1975 and a master's degree in nuclear engineering in 1977. He then pursued doctoral studies in the United States, earning his Doctor of Science (D.Sc.) in nuclear engineering from the Massachusetts Institute of Technology (MIT) in 1987. He was a research assistant at MIT in 1984. His doctoral dissertation was titled, "Flow recirculation in liquid metal reactor rod bundles".
