= Jinshan Nuclear Power Plant =

Nuclear power plant in Shimen, New Taipei, Taiwan

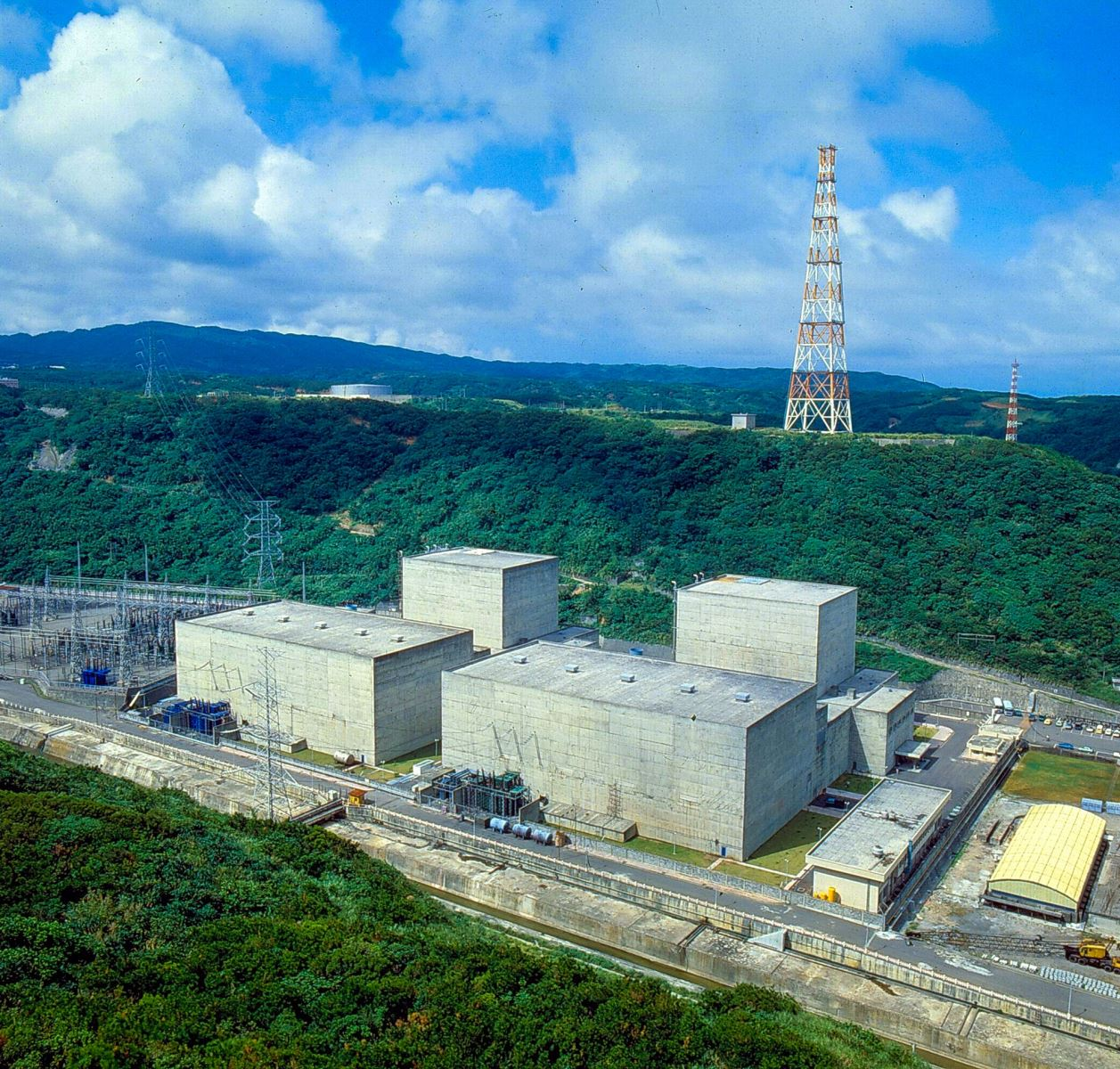
- Official name: 金山核能發電廠
- Country: Taiwan
- Location: Qianhua, Shimen, New Taipei
- Coordinates: 25°17′9″N 121°35′10″E
- Status: Decommissioned
- Commission date: 10 December 1978 (Unit 1); 15 July 1979 (Unit 2)
- Decommission date: 6 December 2018 (Unit 1); 16 July 2019 (Unit 2)
- Owner: Taipower
- Operator: Taiwan Power Company

Nuclear power station
- Reactor type: BWR-4
- Reactor supplier: General Electric

Power generation
- Units operational: 2 x 636 MW
- Make and model: Westinghouse Electric
- Nameplate capacity: 1,272 MW
- Capacity factor: 85.0%

External links
- Commons: Related media on Commons

The Jinshan Nuclear Power Plant, or Chin Shan Nuclear Power Plant (金山核能發電廠), First Nuclear Power Plant (第一核能發電廠 or 核一), was a nuclear power plant in Shimen District, New Taipei, Taiwan. Commissioned in 1978, the plant was Taiwan's first and smallest nuclear power plant.

== Construction ==
Construction of the Jinshan Nuclear Power Plant began on Friday, 2 June 1972 in response to the 1970s energy crisis. The plant was one of the Ten Major Construction Projects. To make way for the plant, the village of Qianhua in Shimen District, Taipei, was demolished.

== Generation ==
Jinshan began generating power on 16 November 1977 and started commercial operations in December 1978.

The power plant can generate 9 billion kWh of electricity per year.

The two spent fuel pools at the plant have 3,074 and 3,076 spent nuclear fuel assemblies, respectively, with a maximum storage capacity of 3,083 assemblies per pool.

== Decommissioning plan ==
Taipower, as the operator of the power plant, was required by the Radiation Monitoring Center of the Atomic Energy Council to submit the 2018 decommissioning plans for the plant by December 2015 so that the authority could review the plans before the decommissioning date. Once the reactors had been shut down, the plant had to be dismantled within 25 years.

Taipower plans to allocate NT$18.2 billion for the disposal of nuclear waste from the decommissioned plant over the next 25 years. Currently, Taipower is conducting a feasibility study on building a nuclear waste storage facility on an uninhabited island off the coast of Taiwan.

== Events ==
The July 2013 Typhoon Soulik caused the generator and turbine of Unit 2 of the power plant to trip because a suspension ground line failed and hit the transmission line when the typhoon hit the island on 13–14 July. The typhoon also caused the seawater inlet to be blocked by a large amount of debris and damaged three fine filters, the travelling filter rake, and the plant's switchyard. The damage caused the plant to be offline for several days.

In August 2013, it was reported that radioactive water may have been leaking from the storage pools of the nuclear power plant's two reactors for three years. An official from Taipower said that the water might come from various sources, such as condensation water or water used for cleaning the floors. The water, however, has been collected in a reservoir next to the storage pools used for spent nuclear rods and recycled back into the storage pools; thus, it is claimed to pose no threat to the environment.

In December 2013, one of the two circulating pumps of the second reactor was tripped by the built-in lube oil pump due to low lube oil pressure. The Atomic Energy Council was criticised for its very slow response to the public, as it provided answers 10 hours after the trip.

On 4 August 2016, unstable voltage frequency caused external circuit breakers to trip and produce smoke.

== See also ==
- Energy in Taiwan
- List of power stations in Taiwan
- Nuclear power in Taiwan
