= Tsai Huei-min =

Taiwanese geographer

- 蔡慧敏

Deputy minister of Atomic Energy Council of the Republic of China
- Incumbent
- Assumed office 20 May 2016
- Minister: Hsieh Shou-shing

Personal details
- Education: National Taiwan Normal University (BS); Ohio State University (MS); National Taiwan University (PhD)

Tsai Huei-min (Chinese: 蔡慧敏; pinyin: Cài Huìmǐn) is a Taiwanese geographer. She was the deputy minister of the Atomic Energy Council of the Executive Yuan.

== Education ==
Tsai graduated from National Taiwan Normal University with a bachelor's degree in biology. She then earned a master's degree in natural resource management from Ohio State University and a Ph.D. in geography from National Taiwan University in 1999. Her doctoral dissertation was titled, "An Analysis of Landscape Transformation on Kinmen Island, Taiwan" (Chinese: 島嶼環境變遷研究-金門島地景型塑與轉化分析).
