= Lin Wei-shan =

Taiwanese businessman

Lin Wei-shan (Chinese: 林蔚山; pinyin: Lín Wèishān) is a Taiwanese businessman. He is the present chairman and president of Tatung Company, which his grandfather Lin Shan-chih founded in 1918. He took over the presidency from his father Lin Ting-sheng on 17 March 2006. However, his wife Lin Kuo Wen-yen is widely considered as the de facto executor in Tatung.
