= Chang Ching-wen =

Taiwanese academic, politician, public and environmental health doctor

Chang Chin-wen
- 張靜文
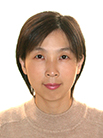
- Official portrait, 2023

16th Minister of Atomic Energy Council
- In office 11 January 2023 – 26 September 2023; Acting: 11 January 2023 — 31 January 2023
- Prime Minister: Su Tseng-chang; Chen Chien-jen
- Deputy: Liu Wen-chung
- Preceded by: Hsieh Shou-shing
- Succeeded by: Council abolished (Note: Chen Tung-yang as the Chairman of the Nuclear Safety Commission)

Personal details
- Born: January 17, 1966 (age 60)
- Education: National Taiwan University (BS, MPH); University of Cincinnati (PhD)

Chang Ching-wen (Chinese: 張靜文; pinyin: Zhāng Jìngwén; born January 17, 1966) is a Taiwanese environmental health scientist who was the minister of the Atomic Energy Council in 2023.

== Education ==
Chang graduated from National Taiwan University with a bachelor's degree and a Master of Public Health (M.P.H.) degree. She then completed doctoral studies in the United States at the University of Cincinnati, where she earned her Ph.D. in environmental health and industrial hygiene from the University of Cincinnati Medical Center in 1994. Her doctoral dissertation was titled, "A study of the colony masking effect in bioaerosol sampling and analysis".

== Career ==
Upon her return to Taiwan, Chang became a supervisor and director for the Taiwan Occupational Hygiene Association and Taiwan Society of Indoor Environmental Quality. She also held a professorship at NTU.

Chang also worked with several governmental organizations, first as a research fellow affiliated with the Institute of Occupational Safety and Health, a division of the Council of Labor Affairs. She subsequently served on the Infectious Disease Control Board reporting to the Ministry of Health and Welfare, was appointed to the Environmental Protection Agency's Air Pollution Control Fund Management Board, and became a member and deputy minister of the Atomic Energy Council under minister Hsieh Shou-shing. Chang was appointed minister of the Atomic Energy Council in January 2023.
