= Tatung University =

Private university in Taipei, Taiwan

Coordinates: 25°04′.22″N 121°31′20″E

- 大同大學
- Former names: Tatung Institute of Technology
- Type: Private university
- Established: 1956
- Founders: Lin Shan-chih
- Affiliations: Tatung Company
- President: Her Ming-guo
- Location: Zhongshan, Taipei, Taiwan
- Website: http://ao.ttu.edu.tw/

Chinese name
- Traditional Chinese: 大同大學
- Simplified Chinese: 大同大学
Transcriptions
Standard Mandarin
- Hanyu Pinyin: Dàtóng Dàxué
- Wade–Giles: Ta-t'ung Ta-hsüeh
Southern Min
- Hokkien POJ: Tāi-tông Tāi-ha̍k

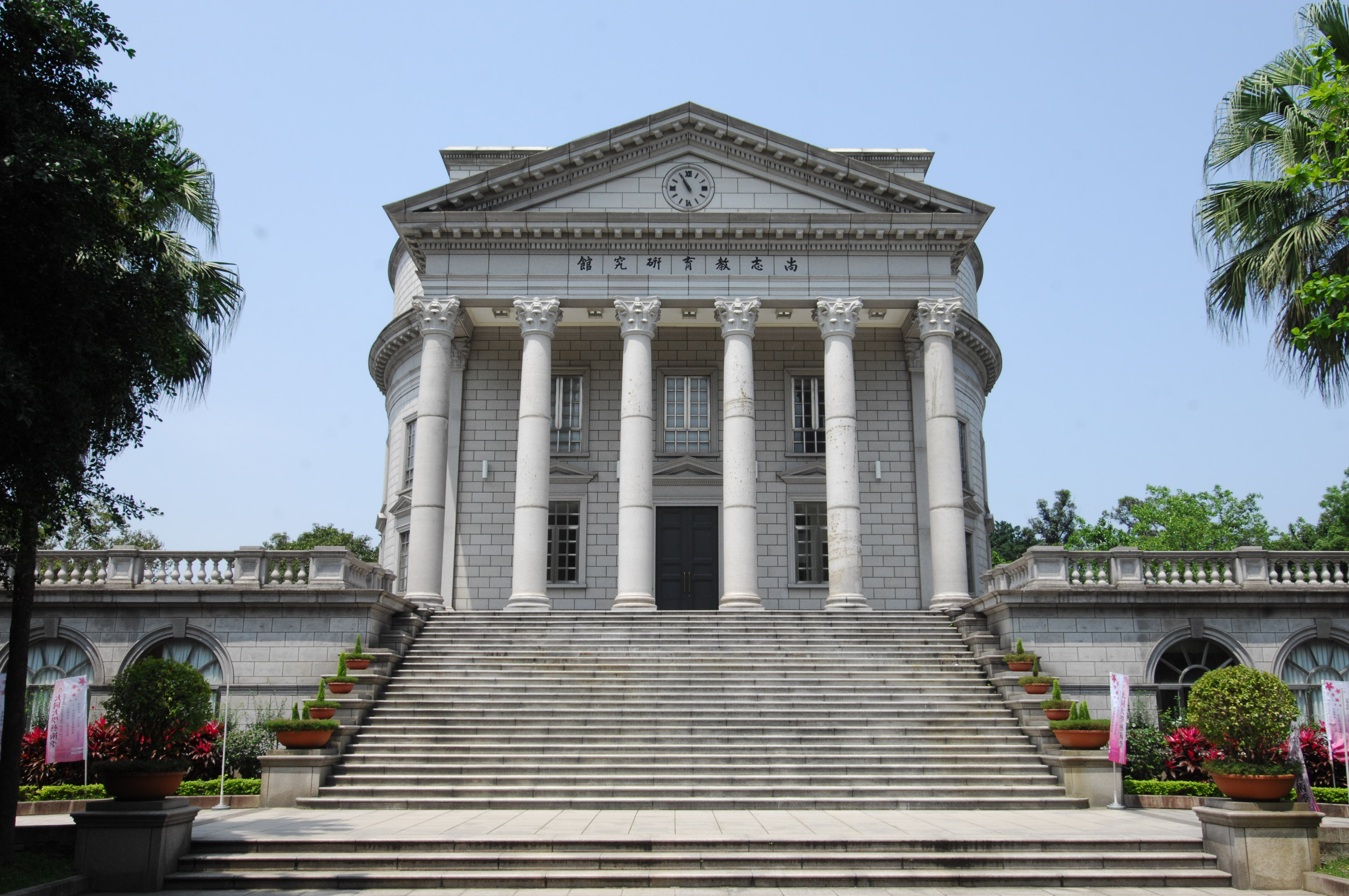
San-Chin Hall

Tatung University (TTU/Chinese: 大同大學; Pe̍h-ōe-jī: Tāi-tông Tāi-ha̍k) is a private university in Zhongshan, Taipei, Taiwan. It was first founded in 1956 as Tatung Institute of Technology but renamed in 1999 as Tatung University. Currently, Tatung University has four colleges: College of Electrical Engineering and Computer Science, College of Engineering, College of Management and College of Design.

== History ==
The university was first founded as Tatung Institute of Technology in 1956 and began to offer two-year college programs. Dr. T. S. Lin was then appointed as president of the school. The institute was accredited to be a four-year institute of technology in 1963, and began to offer several master's programs in 1976 and doctoral programs in 1982. It was renamed as Tatung University in 1999. Since 1956, the school has had four scholar-educators: Dr. T.S. Lin (1956-2006), Dr. Jian-Kuo Wu (2006- 2009), Dr. Wen-Cheng Chu (2009-2013), and Dr. Ming-Guo Ho (2013-). In 2019, the university had an enrollment rate of 46.10%.

== Academics ==
The university is composed of four colleges with 10 departments, 11 master's programs and 6 Ph.D. programs. The number of students enrolled now stands at 4,497 with 30% pursuing graduate studies.

In 2013 RedDot Design Ranking, Tatung University was ranked #4 in the Asia-Pacific area Universities. Also, it was ranked #18 in the global universities in 2013 iF Ranking.

=== College of Engineering ===
- The Department of Mechanical Engineering (Bachelor/Master/Ph.D)
- The Department of Chemical Engineering and Biotechnology (Bachelor/Master/Ph.D)
- The Department of Materials Engineering (Bachelor/Master/Ph.D)

=== College of Management ===
- The Department of Business Management (Bachelor/MBA/EMBA)
- The Department of Information Management (Bachelor/Master)
- The Department of Applied Foreign Languages

=== College of Electrical and Computer Science ===
- The Department of Electrical Engineering (Bachelor/Master/Ph.D)
- The Department of Computer Science and Engineering (Bachelor/Master/Ph.D)

=== College of Design ===
- The Department of Industrial Design (Bachelor/Master)
- The Department of Media Design (Bachelor/Master)
- The Graduate Institute of Design Science

== Transportation ==
The university is accessible within walking distance South East from Yuanshan Station of the Taipei Metro.

== Notable alumni ==
- David Sun, Kingston Technology Corporation
- Ching-Sung Yu, TaiSol Electronics Co., Ltd.
- Hsieh Shou-shing, Minister of the Atomic Energy Council

== See also ==
- List of universities in Taiwan
- U12 Consortium
