= Chiu Tzu-tsung =

Taiwanese nuclear engineer

- 邱賜聰

Deputy Minister of Atomic Energy Council of the Republic of China
- Incumbent
- Assumed office 2017
- Minister: Hsieh Shou-shing
- Preceded by: Huang Tsing-tung

Personal details
- Education: National Tsing Hua University (BS, MS)

Chiu Tzu-tsung (Chinese: 邱賜聰; pinyin: Qiū Cìcōng) is a Taiwanese nuclear engineer who has been the Deputy Minister of the Atomic Energy Council of the Republic of China since 2017.

== Education ==
Chiu obtained his bachelor's degree in nuclear engineering from National Tsing Hua University in 1975 and master's degree in nuclear science from the same university in 1979.

== Careers ==
=== Atomic Energy Council ===
In the Atomic Energy Council, he has been the director of Fuel Cycle and Materials Administration, director of Department of Nuclear Regulation, director of Department of Planning, director of Department of Radiation Protection, executive secretary of Legal Affairs Committee and engineering superintendent and chief executive secretary.

In June 2017, Chiu reiterated the plan to make Taiwan nuclear-free by 2025 and to decommission nuclear power plants on schedule.

On 21–23 September 2017, Chiu will become the commander-in-chief for the annual safety drill which will take place around Kuosheng Nuclear Power Plant in Wanli District, New Taipei, in which 10,000 personnel will be mobilized. Health and Welfare Deputy Minister Hsueh Jui-yuan and Economic Affairs Deputy Minister Yang Wei-fuu will become deputy commanders.
