= Kuosheng Nuclear Power Plant =

Nuclear power plant in Wanli, New Taipei, Taiwan

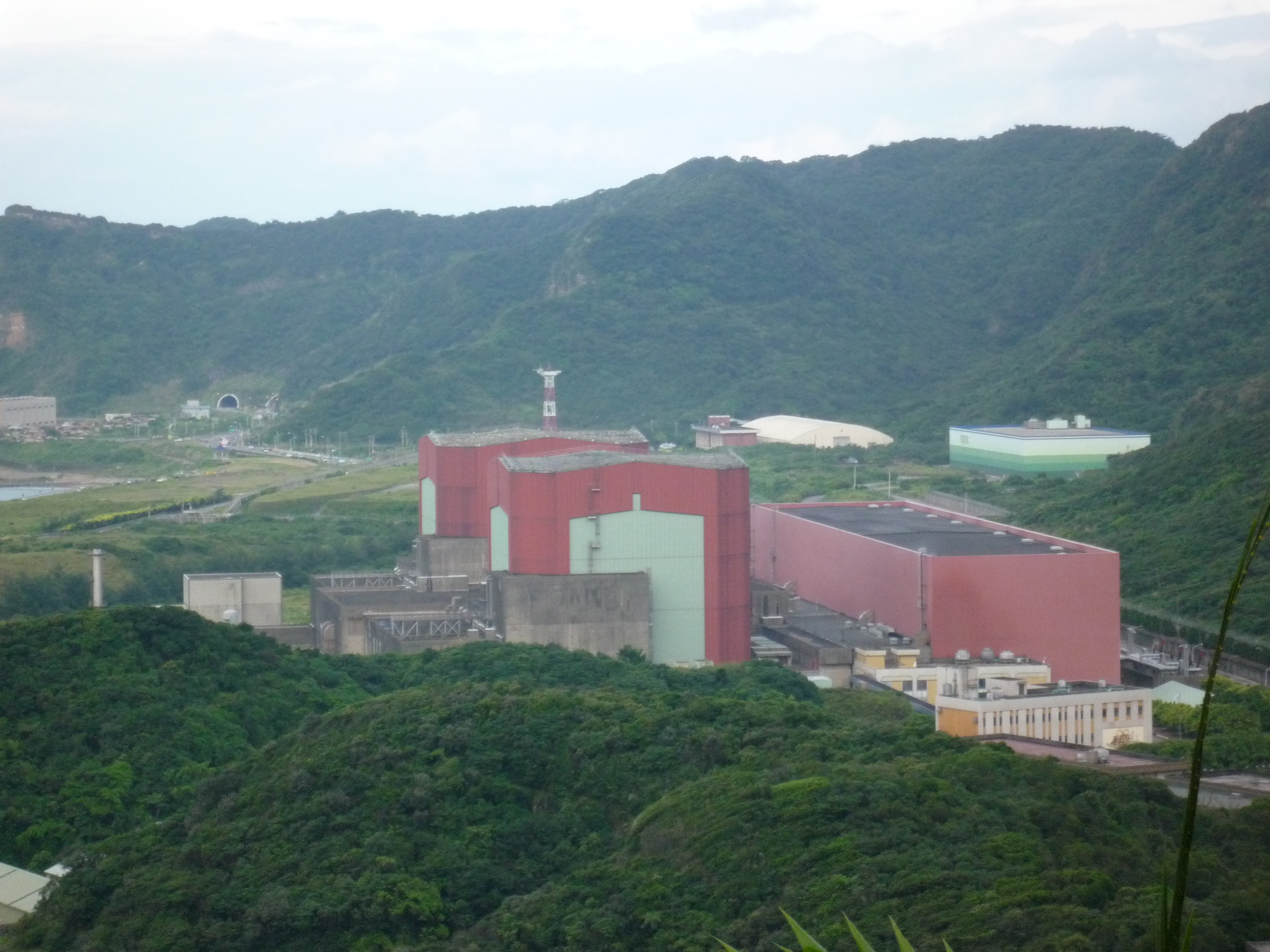
- Official name: 國聖核能發電廠
- Country: Republic of China
- Location: Wanli, New Taipei
- Coordinates: 25°12′10″N 121°39′45″E
- Status: Decommissioned
- Commission date: December 1981 (Unit 1); March 1983 (Unit 2)
- Decommission date: 1 July 2021 (Unit 1); March 2023
- Owner: Taipower
- Operator: Taipower

Nuclear power station
- Reactor type: BWR-6
- Reactor supplier: General Electric

Power generation
- Make and model: Westinghouse Electric
- Units decommissioned: 2 x 985
- Nameplate capacity: 1,970 MW; 985 MW

External links
- Commons: Related media on Commons

The Kuosheng Nuclear Power Plant or Guosheng Nuclear Power Plant (traditional Chinese: 國聖核能發電廠; simplified Chinese: 国圣核能发电厂; pinyin: Guóshèng Hénéng Fādiànchǎng), Second Nuclear Power Plant (第二核能發電廠 or 核二), was a nuclear power plant in Wanli District, New Taipei, Taiwan. The plant was the largest nuclear power plant in Taiwan.

== Generation ==
The power plant could generate 16 billion kWh of electricity per year. Both boiling water reactors had been retired by 2023.

== History ==
=== 1981 ===
The power plant was commissioned in December 1981.

=== 2010 ===
On 7 October 2010, Unit 1 of the plant was shut down for refueling starting at 12:49 a.m. and was synchronized back to the system on 31 October at 12:14 p.m. establishing a new record in Taiwan for the shortest nuclear power plant overhaul duration of 24.48 days.

=== 2011 ===
On 17 May 2011, Taipower and New Taipei City Fire Department organized the very first compound disaster drill in Taiwan. This event was held at the Kuosheng Nuclear Power Plant and observed by President Ma Ying-jeou. The training scenario was based on the events of the Fukushima Daiichi nuclear disaster that occurred on 11 March 2011. A statement issued by Taipower indicated that in the worst-case scenario, where the plant experiences total power failure, saving lives would be top priority. In this scenario, the plant would be abandoned and seawater injected to prevent the meltdown of the nuclear core.

=== 2012 ===
During routine maintenance of the power plant on 16 March 2012, the plant maintenance workers discovered problems with seven anchor bolts used to secure the bottom of the nuclear reactor to the steel-reinforced concrete substrate that holds the weight of the reactor. One bolt was broken, two were fractured and four were cracked. Taipower said that they would consult relevant agencies to analyze and fix the problem and add vibration-monitoring sensors near the reactor base for continuous monitoring.

=== 2013 ===
The plant's number one nuclear reactor automatically shut down on Friday, 21 June 2013. The automatic shutdown occurred because protective device was activated when the generator's grounding signal showed abnormal activity. This was a result of a loose blade in the air damper that fell onto the busbar insulator between the generator and main transformer. The incident did not damage the reactor and there was no release of radioactivity. Taipower mitigated the event by re-securing the blade and replacing the related components. The power plant was back online by Sunday, 23 June 2013.

=== 2015 ===
On 26 December 2015, reactor number one shut down unexpectedly due to a problem with its control systems.

=== 2016 ===
On 16 May 2016, reactor number two was suspended following a fire caused by a short circuit. The incident occurred shortly after operations resumed following annual maintenance. In 2018, technical approval for a restart was given, but actual restart is subject to parliamentary approval.

On 30 May 2016, one of the reactors suddenly shut down.

=== 2017 ===
Between 21-23 September 2017, an annual safety drill took place in which 10,000 personnel were mobilized. The drill was headed by the Atomic Energy Council Deputy Minister Chiu Tzu-tsung as commander-in-chief, Health and Welfare Deputy Minister Hsueh Jui-yuan, and Economic Affairs Deputy Minister Yang Wei-fuu as deputy commanders.

=== 2018 ===
Kuosheng-2 goes operational, after the Atomic Energy Council of Taiwan approved the restart.

=== 2021 ===
Kuosheng 1 was shut down permanently and entered decommissioning on 1 July 2021.

=== 2023 ===
Kuosheng 2 was shut down permanently and entered decommissioning in March 2023.

== Awards ==
On 3 November 2010, the 6th 2010 Asia Power Awards in Singapore awarded the plant a gold medal for the Best Operation and Maintenance Project for installing a 360-degree work platform over the nuclear reactor.

== See also ==
- Energy in Taiwan
- List of power stations in Taiwan
- Nuclear power in Taiwan
- Electricity sector in Taiwan
