= Hu Chin-piao =

Taiwanese politician

- 胡錦標

Chairperson of the Atomic Energy Council
- In office 7 March 2001 – 31 January 2002
- Preceded by: Hsia Te-yu
- Succeeded by: Ouyang Min-shen
- In office 10 June 1996 – 19 May 2000
- Preceded by: Hsu Yi-yun
- Succeeded by: Hsia Te-yu

Hu Chin-piao (Chinese: 胡錦標) is a Taiwanese politician who led the Atomic Energy Council twice, from 1996 to 2000 and again between 2001 and 2002.

Hu was appointed head of the Atomic Energy Council in June 1996 under president Lee Teng-hui and premier Lien Chan. He retained his position when Vincent Siew assumed the premiership. In March 1999, Hu granted permission for the Lungmen Nuclear Power Plant to be built, without undertaking a second environmental impact assessment, despite the fact that Taiwan Power Company had decided to increase the plant's power output shortly before construction first commenced. He was succeeded by Hsia Te-yu and became minister without portfolio responsible for investigating compensation for targets of political prosecution. Hu returned to the Atomic Energy Council in March 2001, after Hsia had left office. Soon after beginning his second term as minister of the AEC, Hu decided against a second environmental impact assessment for Lungmen. In January 2002, incoming premier Yu Shyi-kun named Ouyang Min-shen to replace Hu at the Atomic Energy Council.
