= Radiation Monitoring Center =

Government agency of Taiwan

- 輻射偵測中心

Agency overview
- Formed: 1974 (as Taiwan Radiation Monitoring Station); 1996 (as RMC)
- Jurisdiction: Taiwan
- Headquarters: Niaosong, Kaohsiung, Taiwan; 22°39′01.4″N 120°20′50.9″E
- Parent agency: Nuclear Safety Commission
- Website: Official website (in Chinese)

The Radiation Monitoring Center (RMC; traditional Chinese: 輻射偵測中心; simplified Chinese: 辐射侦测中心; pinyin: Fúshè Zhēncè Zhōngxīn) is the agency of the Nuclear Safety Commission of the Taiwan (ROC) which carries out monitoring of natural and man-made ionizing radiation in the environment and within the vicinity of nuclear power plants in Taiwan.

== History ==
The center was originally established in 1974 as Taiwan Radiation Monitoring Station. In 1996, it was changed to Radiation Monitoring Center.

== Organization ==
- Environmental Radiochemistry Analysis Division
- Radiation Protection and Investigation Division
- Information and Dosimeter Division
- Secretariat Office
- Personnel Office
- Accounting and Statistics Office

== See also ==
- Nuclear power in Taiwan
