= Tsai Chuen-horng =

Taiwanese nuclear engineer (born 1950)

- 蔡春鴻

Minister and Chairman of the Atomic Energy Council of the Republic of China
- In office 20 May 2008 – 31 January 2016
- Deputy: Chou Yuan-chin; Huang Tsing-tung
- Preceded by: Su Shian-jang
- Succeeded by: Chou Yuan-chin

Personal details
- Born: 11 March 1950 (age 76) Taiwan
- Education: National Tsing Hua University (BS); University of California, Berkeley (MS, PhD)

Tsai Chuen-horng (traditional Chinese: 蔡春鴻; simplified Chinese: 蔡春鸿; pinyin: Cài Chūnhóng; born 11 March 1950) is a Taiwanese nuclear engineer. He was the Minister and Chairman of the Atomic Energy Council of the Executive Yuan from 2008 to 2016.

== Education ==
Tsai graduated from National Tsing Hua University with a Bachelor of Science (B.S.) in nuclear engineering in 1972. He then completed graduate studies in the United States, where he earned a Master of Science (M.S.) in 1975 and his Ph.D. in nuclear engineering from the University of California, Berkeley, in 1981 under professor Donald R. Olander. His doctoral dissertation was titled, "The kinetics of laser pulse vaporization of uranium dioxide by mass spectrometry".

== Early career ==
Tsai held several positions in NTHU from 1982 until his ministry appointment in 2008, such as associate professor, professor and chairman or director of the Institute of Nuclear Engineering, dean of the Office of Student Affairs, professor of the Department of Nuclear Engineering and Engineering Physics, dean of the College of Nuclear Science, professor of the Department of Engineering and System Sciences, and distinguished professor.

== See also ==
- Nuclear power in Taiwan
