= Taiwan Power Building =

Skyscraper office building in Zhongzheng District, Taipei, Taiwan

- 台電大樓
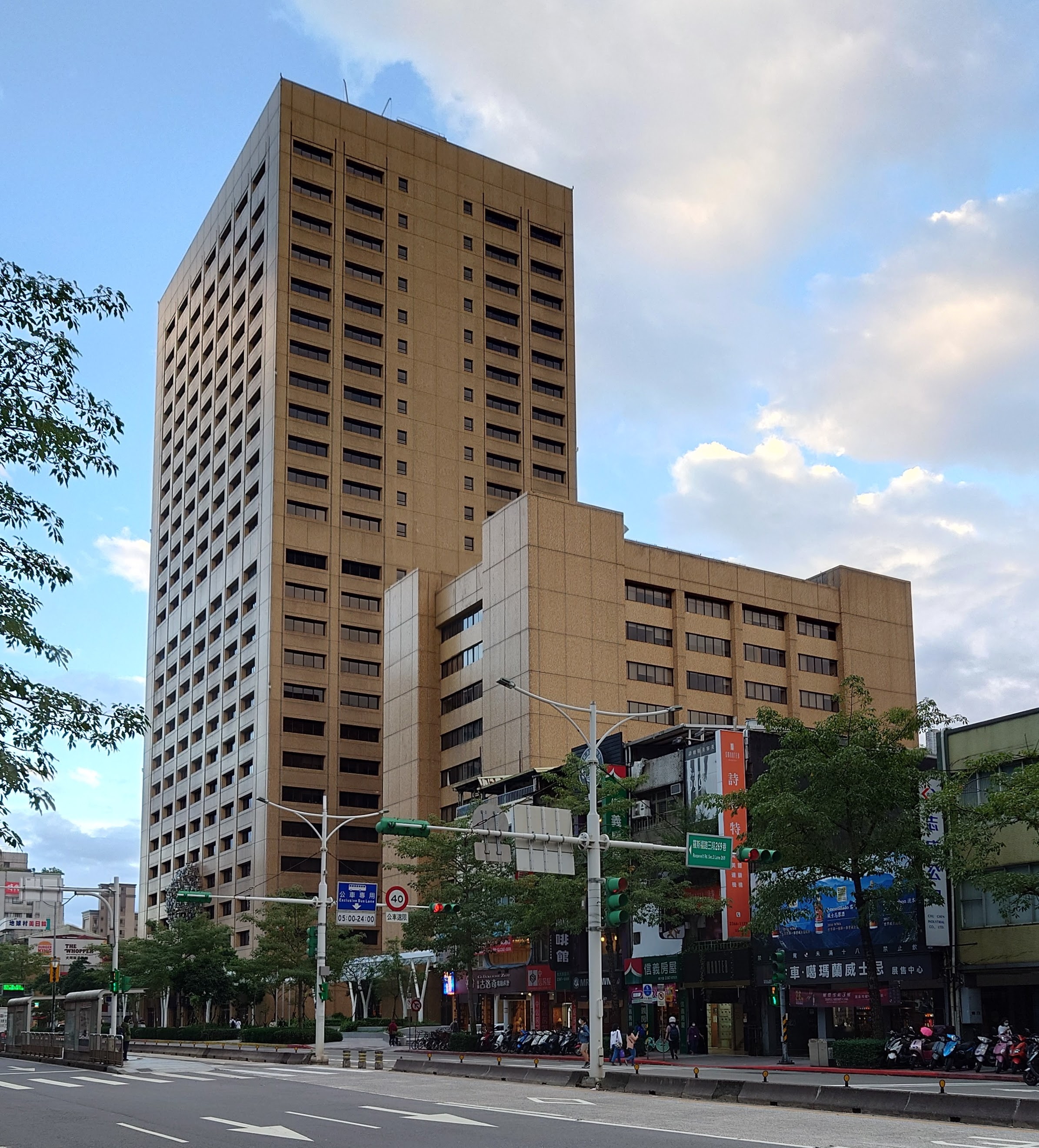
- Interactive map of the Taiwan Power Building area

General information
- Type: Office
- Location: No. 242, Section 3, Roosevelt Road, Zhongzheng District, Taipei, Taiwan
- Coordinates: 25°01′02″N 121°31′50″E
- Construction started: 1979
- Completed: 1983

Height
- Architectural: 127 m (417 ft)

Technical details
- Floor count: 27

Design and construction
- Architect: Kaku Morin

The Taiwan Power Building, also known as Taipower Building or Taipower Headquarters (Chinese: 台電大樓), is a skyscraper office building in Zhongzheng District, Taipei, Taiwan. The height of building is 127 m (417 ft), and it comprises 27 floors above ground, as well as three basement levels. The tower was completed in 1983 and was designed by Kaku Morin. It houses the corporate headquarters of Taiwan Power Company and was the first building in Taiwan to surpass 100 m (330 ft). The building overtook the First Commercial Bank Building in 1983 and became the tallest building in Taiwan from 1983 to 1988, before it was overtaken by TWTC International Trade Building.

In 2018, although the Taiwan Power Building had been completed for 36 years, through the integration of smart energy conservation, using the Intelligent Building Energy Management System, it monitored and analyzed its energy usage, updated the air conditioning system, and created a green computer room. It saves around 1.6 million kilowatt-hours of electricity and nearly 4,000 tonnes of water annually, and has thus been awarded the highest level of platinum certification for existing building renovations by the U.S. Green Building Certification Leadership in Energy and Environmental Design (LEED). It is the oldest LEED certified green building in Taiwan, receiving full marks to place in the top fifth percentile of office buildings worldwide, and only about 400 buildings in the world have received this certification.

== See also ==
- List of tallest buildings in Taiwan
- List of tallest buildings in Taipei
- Taiwan Power Company
- Taipower Building metro station

Preceded by First Commercial Bank Building	Tallest building in Taiwan; 1983 – 1988	Succeeded by TWTC International Trade Building
