= Hsia Te-yu =

Taiwanese nuclear scientist

- 夏德鈺

Minister of Atomic Energy Council of the Republic of China
- In office 20 May 2000 – 6 March 2001
- Preceded by: Hu Chin-piao
- Succeeded by: Hu Chin-piao

Personal details
- Born: August 10, 1949 (age 76) Kaohsiung, Taiwan
- Political party: Kuomintang
- Education: National Tsing Hua University (BS); University of Tennessee (MS); Massachusetts Institute of Technology (PhD)

Hsia Te-yu (Chinese: 夏德鈺; pinyin: Xià Déyù; born August 10, 1949) is a Taiwanese nuclear scientist who led the Atomic Energy Council from May 2000 to March 2001.

== Early life and education ==
Hsia was born in Gangshan, Kaohsiung County, on August 10, 1949. His ancestral home is in Wuchang, Wuhan. He graduated from National Tsing Hua University with a bachelor's degree in nuclear engineering and completed graduate studies in the United States, where he obtained a master's degree in nuclear physics from the University of Tennessee and earned his Ph.D. in nuclear engineering from the Massachusetts Institute of Technology (MIT).

== Career ==
After receiving his doctorate, Hsia worked for the Atomic Energy Council for over a decade prior to accepting an appointment to lead the AEC. At the time of his promotion, Hsia was head researcher at the AEC's Institute of Nuclear Energy Research. Hsia, a Kuomintang member, took office with the Tang Fei minority cabinet on 20 May 2000. He was supportive of the use of nuclear energy, though many others in the Executive Yuan were not. Much of Hsia's tenure was spent discussing the status of the Lungmen Nuclear Power Plant. In March 2001, Hsia left office and was succeeded by Hu Chin-piao.
