= Yen Chen-hsing =

Engineer, educator, politician in Taiwan (1912–2005)

- 閻振興
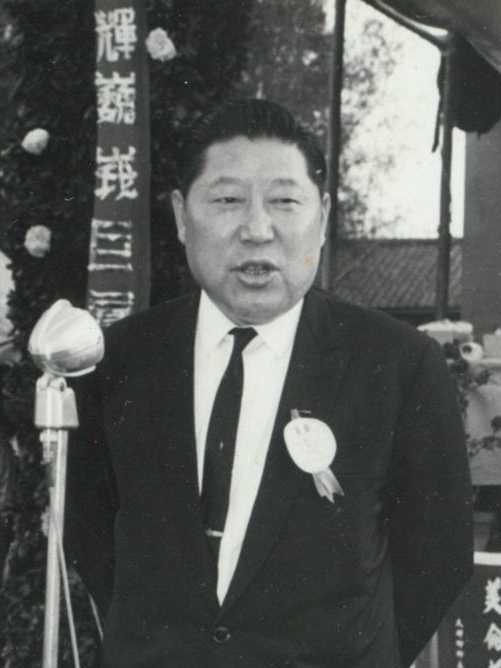

President of National Taiwan University
- In office July 1970 – July 1981
- Preceded by: Chien Shih-Liang
- Succeeded by: Yu Chao-chung

President of National Chung-Shan Institute of Science and Technology
- In office 1 July 1969 – 31 January 1971
- Preceded by: Position established
- Succeeded by: Tang Chun-po

President of National Tsing Hua University
- In office 1969–1970
- Preceded by: Chen Ke-chung
- Succeeded by: Shu Shien-Siu

Chairperson of the Atomic Energy Council
- In office 10 April 1981 – 1 June 1990
- Preceded by: Chien Shih-Liang
- Succeeded by: Hsu Yi-yun
- In office 20 April 1966 – 5 December 1971
- Preceded by: Huang Chi-lu
- Succeeded by: Chien Shih-Liang

Chairperson of the National Youth Commission
- In office 28 January 1966 – 9 July 1970
- Preceded by: Position established
- Succeeded by: Lee Huan

Minister of Education
- In office 25 January 1965 – 1 July 1969
- Preceded by: Huang Chi-lu
- Succeeded by: Chung Chiao-kuang

President of National Cheng Kung University
- In office August 1957 – December 1964
- Preceded by: Qing Dajun
- Succeeded by: Lo Yun-ping

Personal details
- Born: 10 July 1912 Runan County, Henan, Republic of China
- Died: 7 January 2005 (aged 92)
- Education: National Tsing Hua University (BS); University of Iowa (MS, PhD)

Yen Chen-hsing

Chinese name
- Traditional Chinese: 閻振興
- Hanyu Pinyin: Yán Zhènxīng
- Hokkien POJ: Giâm Chín-heng
- Tâi-lô: Giâm Tsín-hing

Yen Chen-hsing (Chinese: 閻振興; pinyin: Yán Zhènxīng; Pe̍h-ōe-jī: Giâm Chín-heng; 10 July 1912 – 7 January 2005) was a Chinese-born engineer, educator, and politician based in Taiwan.

== Early life and education ==
Yen was born in Henan, China, on July 10, 1912. He graduated from National Tsing Hua University in Beijing and moved to the United States in 1937 to pursue graduate studies there. He earned a Master of Science (M.S.) in 1938 and his Ph.D. in 1941 in mechanical engineering and hydraulic engineering from the University of Iowa. His doctoral dissertation, completed under professor Joseph W. Howe, was titled, "Determination of best proportions for canal bend".

== Career ==
Upon graduation, Yen returned to China and helped construct the Burma Road. After World War II, Yen devised plans to dam the Yellow River. He joined the faculty of Henan University shortly before moving to Taiwan in 1949, along with Chiang Kai-shek's Nationalist government. In Taiwan, Yen became chief engineer of Kaohsiung Harbor before assuming the presidency of National Cheng Kung University in 1957. He stepped down in 1965 and was named Minister of Education.

The next year, Yen began concurrently serving as chairman of the National Youth Commission. As education minister, Yen extended the length of compulsory education programs in Taiwan from six years to nine years and helped establish many junior colleges. Yen left the Ministry of Education in 1969 and ended his tenure at the National Youth Commission the next year. He stepped down from the Atomic Energy Council in 1971, having held the position since 1966. Yen assumed administrative posts at several universities while working in the government, and also held party posts, namely membership in the Kuomintang Standing Committee from 1981.

While serving as president of National Chung-Shan Institute of Science and Technology from 1969 to 1971, Yen was also president of National Tsing Hua University until 1970. He then led National Taiwan University from 1970 to 1981. Upon stepping down from NTU, Yen returned to the Atomic Energy Council from 1981 to 1990 and later served President Lee Teng-hui as a senior adviser. Yen was elected to the Academia Sinica in 1982 and awarded the University of Iowa's Distinguished Alumni Award for Achievement in 1984. In 1999, the University of Iowa inducted Yen into its Distinguished Engineering Alumni Academy.

Yen died in January 2005, aged 92. Following his death, the "Chen-Hsing Fluid Dynamics Lab" and "Chen-Hsing Memorial Hall" at National Taiwan University were dedicated in Yen's honor.
