= 2018 Taiwanese referendum =

Referendum

A multi-question referendum was held in Taiwan on 24 November 2018 alongside local elections. The referendum was the first since the December 2017 reform to the Referendum Act, which reduced the threshold for submitting questions to the ballot; under the new system, signatures from 1.5 percent of the electorate (around 280,000 people) were required to successfully put a question on the ballot, reduced from 5 percent previously.

In the referendum, 67% of Taiwan voters rejected legalising same-sex marriage. However, less than a year later, lawmakers of the majority Democratic Progressive Party (DPP) legalised same-sex marriage in May 2019.

== Background ==
A total of ten questions appeared on the ballot. Under Taiwanese law, for their initiative to be presented to the voters, a total of 280,000 signatures (1.5% of eligible voters) were required for a question to be considered by the Central Election Commission (CEC). Five of the questions reviewed and approved by the CEC were about LGBT rights, LGBT sex education and same-sex marriage. Four other questions on the ballot concerned international games representation, nuclear power, coal power and a ban on imports of agricultural products and food from areas affected by the Fukushima nuclear disaster. The tenth question asked voters to reject Article 95-1 of the Electricity Act, which stipulated that all of the country's nuclear power generating facilities should be decommissioned by 2025. This question had originally been rejected by the CEC, though the commission reversed its decision after being ordered by the Taipei High Administrative Court to accept an additional 24,000 signatures added to the petition.

For a proposal to be approved, at least 25 percent of the eligible voters had to vote in favour of the question.

=== Same-sex marriage proposals ===
In February 2018, a Taiwanese conservative Christian group opposed to same-sex marriage (the Alliance for Next Generation's Happiness) proposed holding a referendum on the issue, aiming to overturn a May 2017 ruling by the Constitutional Court that mandated the legalisation of same-sex marriage in Taiwan within two years. The Central Election Commission reviewed and accepted the group's proposals in April 2018. Two of their approved questions were related to same-sex marriage; one on whether marriage should be limited to a bond between a man and a woman and one on whether there should be a special law to protect same-sex couples' right to a "permanent union" (effectively introducing civil unions). A third question will ask voters whether to prevent the implementation of laws mandating the inclusion of information about homosexuality in sexual education classes at schools.

In September 2018, a group in favor of same-sex marriage announced that it had collected enough signatures to submit its own questions to a referendum. The group's questions would require the legislature to amend the Civil Code to expressly allow same-sex couples to marry and also mandated the inclusion of gender diversity in sex education.

=== Olympics name proposal ===
The Olympics question proved controversial. While the name Chinese Taipei is seen by many Taiwanese as confusing and even offensive, many voters and athletes worried that insisting on competing under the name Taiwan would lead to the total expulsion as a member in the International Olympic Committee. The proposal was rejected by 54.80% of voters.

== Questions and results ==
The ten questions that appeared on the ballot and final results were:

Number	Result	English translation	Original
7	Adopted	Do you agree “To reduce by 1% year by year” the electricity production from thermal power plants?	你是否同意以「平均每年至少降低1%」之方式逐年降低火力發電廠發電量？
8	Adopted	Do you agree to the establishment of an energy policy to “Stop construction and expansion of any coal-fired thermal power plants or generator units (including the Shen Ao Power Plant currently under construction)”?	您是否同意確立「停止新建、擴建任何燃煤發電廠或發電機組（包括深澳電廠擴建）」之能源政策？
9	Adopted	Do you agree that the government should maintain the prohibition of agricultural imports and food from areas affected by the Fukushima March 11 Disaster? Specifically, those from Fukushima proper and the 4 surrounding districts and cities of Ibaraki, Tochigi, Gunma, and Chiba?	你是否同意政府維持禁止開放日本福島311核災相關地區，包括福島與周遭4縣市（茨城、櫪木、群馬、千葉）等地區農產品及食品進口？
10	Adopted	Do you agree that marriage defined in the Civil Code should be restricted to the union between one man and one woman?	你是否同意民法婚姻規定應限定在一男一女的結合？
11	Adopted	Do you agree that the Ministry of Education should not implement the Enforcement Rules of the Gender Equality Education Act in elementary and middle schools?	你是否同意在國民教育階段內（國中及國小），教育部及各級學校不應對學生實施性別平等教育法施行細則所定之同志教育？
12	Adopted	Do you agree to the protection of the rights of same-sex couples in co-habitation on a permanent basis in ways other than changing of the Civil Code?	你是否同意以民法婚姻規定以外之其他形式來保障同性別二人經營永久共同生活的權益？
13	Rejected	Do you agree to the use of “Taiwan” when participating in all international sport competitions, including the upcoming 2020 Tokyo Olympics?	你是否同意，以「台灣」（Taiwan）為全名申請參加所有國際運動賽事及2020年東京奧運？
14	Rejected	Do you agree to the protection of same-sex marital rights with marriage as defined in the Civil Code?	您是否同意，以民法婚姻章保障同性別二人建立婚姻關係？
15	Rejected	Do you agree in accordance with the Gender Equality Education Act that national education of all levels should educate students on the importance of gender equality, emotional education, sex education, and same-sex education?	您是否同意，以「性別平等教育法」明定在國民教育各階段內實施性別平等教育，且內容應涵蓋情感教育、性教育、同志教育等課程？
16	Adopted	Do you agree to repeal Article 95 Paragraph 1 of the Electricity Act: “Should Nuclear-energy-based power generating facilities stop running by 2025”?	您是否同意：廢除電業法第95條第1項，即廢除「核能發電設備應於中華民國一百十四年以前，全部停止運轉」之條文？

== Results ==
Results by district/township for the question on ceasing expansion of coal power plants

Referendum results
Question	For		Against		Invalid/ blank	Total	Registered voters	Turnout	Outcome
Question	Votes	%	Votes	%	Invalid/ blank	Total	Registered voters	Turnout	Outcome
Reducing output from thermal power plants	7,955,753	79.04	2,109,157	20.96	715,140	10,780,050	19,757,067	54.56	Approved
Ceasing expansion of coal power plants	7,599,267	76.41	2,346,316	23.59	823,945	10,769,528	19,757,067	54.51	Approved
Prohibition of food imports from Fukushima	7,791,856	77.74	2,231,425	22.26	756,041	10,779,322	19,757,067	54.56	Approved
Restricting marriage under Civil Code to one man and woman	7,658,008	72.48	2,907,429	27.52	459,508	11,024,945	19,757,067	55.80	Approved
Not implementing homosexual aspect of Gender Equality Education Act	7,083,379	67.44	3,419,624	32.56	507,101	11,010,104	19,757,067	55.73	Approved
Protecting rights of same-sex couples outside of the Civil Code	6,401,748	61.12	4,072,471	38.88	540,757	11,014,976	19,757,067	55.75	Approved
Apply to competing in international sports as "Taiwan" at Olympics and other sporting event	4,763,086	45.20	5,774,556	54.80	505,153	11,042,795	19,757,067	55.89	Rejected
Protection of same-sex marital rights	3,382,286	32.74	6,949,697	67.26	608,484	10,940,467	19,757,067	55.37	Rejected
Implementing the Gender Equality Education Act	3,507,665	34.01	6,805,171	65.99	619,001	10,931,837	19,757,067	55.33	Rejected
Repealing the planned end of nuclear power stations	5,895,560	59.49	4,014,215	40.51	922,960	10,832,735	19,757,067	54.83	Approved
