= Tatung Company =

Taiwanese multinational corporation

Tatung Company 大同股份有限公司
- Type: Public (TWSE: 2371) since 1962-02-09
- Industry: Computer hardware Electronics; Home appliances
- Founded: 1918; 108 years ago
- Headquarters: Zhongshan, Taipei, Taiwan
- Products: Personal computers, LCD TVs, home appliances, and others
- Revenue: ▲NT$ 43.072 Billion (2007) (US$ 1.351 Billion)
- Website: www.tatung.com

Tatung Company (Chinese: 大同股份有限公司; pinyin: Dàtóng Gǔfèn Yǒuxiàn Gōngsī) is a Taiwanese multinational corporation established in 1918 and headquartered in Zhongshan, Taipei, Taiwan.

Established in 1918 and headquartered in Taipei, Tatung Company holds 3 business groups, which includes 8 business units: Industrial Appliance BU, Motor BU, Wire & Cable BU, Solar BU, Smart Meter BU, System Integration BU, Appliance BU, and Advanced Electronics BU. As a conglomerate, Tatung's investees involve in some major industries such as optoelectronics, energy, system integration, industrial system, branding retail channel, and asset development.

== History ==
Xie Zhi Business Enterprise, the forerunner of Tatung Company, was established in 1918 by Shang-Zhi Lin. It was involved in high-profile construction projects, including the Tamsui River embankment project and the Executive Yuan building.

In 1939, Tatung Iron Works was established as the company ventured into iron and steel manufacturing. Following the arrival of the ROC administration in 1945, Tatung Iron Works was renamed to Tatung Steel and Machinery Manufacturing Company. The company began mass production of electrical motors and appliances 10 years later in 1949.

In 1962 the company became publicly listed on the Taiwan Stock Exchange, and was renamed to Tatung Company in 1968. A year later, Tatung began production of color TVs, and adopted the "Tatung Boy" mascot, which became a Taiwanese cultural symbol.

=== Timeline ===
1970 Revenues exceeded NT$2.2 billion, making Tatung Taiwan's foremost private company.

1972 W. S. Lin, the grandson of Shang-Zhi Lin, was appointed as president of Tatung. Shortly thereafter he was implicated in a case of embezzlement at Tatung which would take more than ten years to litigate.

1977 Participated in the Ten Major Construction Projects with the construction of a slag treatment facility for China Steel and provision for Chiang Kai-shek International Airport's power control station

2000 Chunghwa Picture Tubes was listed on the OTC market

2001 Global Management Division set up at the company's headquarters Chunghwa Picture Tubes was listed on the Taiwan Stock Exchange

2003 Mass production of LCD and PDP TVs Lin Cheng-yuan resigns as head of Chunghwa Picture Tubes.

2004 Set up a new subsidiary Toes Opto-Mechatronics Company Established SeQual Technologies Co. to produce the oxygen generator for clinical therapy and home health care uses Established Tatung Compressors (Zhongshan) Co. in China

2005 Consolidated Tatung's Desktop PC Business Unit with Elitegroup Computer Systems (ECS), making Tatung the largest shareholder of ECS Established Tatung Wire & Cable Technology (Wujiang) Co. in China

Death of T.S. Lin

2006 Mr. W. S. Lin was elected as chairman and president of Tatung Green Energy Technology started trading on the emerging stock market

2007 Forward Electronics invested in Apollo Solar Energy Co. to expand its scope into the market of solar cell module

2008 Green Energy Technology was listed on the Taiwan Stock Exchange as 25 January Established Tatung Electric Technology (Vietnam) Co. for the manufacturing and sales of wires and cables

2009 Tatung University launched WiMAX network, the first wireless broadband network ever built in campus alike To help the victims of Typhoon Morakot, Tatung initiated a Special Service Project in which 1,000 technicians and 70 service trucks were mobilized in and around the affected areas to help handle damaged home appliance items. The employees of Tatung Group together with the staff of Tatung University and Tatung High School also donated their one-day earnings totaling to NT$10 million to those in need.

2010 New Energy Business Unit set up a crystal growth center to manufacture multicrystalline silicon bricks, a milestone for HQ's involvement in the crystal-related business Luxury condominium, "Tatung Noble Residences (Phase II of Tatung Tomorrow World)", the 2nd project in Nangang by Shan Chih Asset Development, was under construction

2011 Mrs. W.Y. Lin was appointed President of Tatung

2012 Lithium iron phosphate cathode material by Tatung Fine Chemicals successfully entered into Japanese market of energy storage

2015 Lin Cheng-yuan, indicted in the US on charges of price fixing.

2020 Lin family loses control of the Tatung board of directors. Lin Wen-yuan (no relation) appointed as chairman of the new board.

2021 Lu Ming-kuang, Lin Wen-yuan's successor as chairman, resigns the position.

== Tatung Electric Cooker ==
In 1960, Tatung released an electric rice cooker, the Tatung Electric Cooker (also called "Tatung Dian Guo" from Chinese 電鍋; diàn guō; 'electric pot'). The cooker uses an indirect steam cooking method structured like a double boiler, separating the inner pot from the heating element in the outer pot. It became ubiquitous in urban Taiwanese households by the mid-1970s due to its versatility and relatively low power consumption, with the name "Tatung" eventually becoming synonymous with the steam rice cooker.

Design scholars have noted that the original Tatung Electric Cooker (TAC-6) is a direct copy of Toshiba's RC-6K automatic steam cooker.

== Affiliations ==
- Tatung F.C.
- Tatung University
- Tatung Institute of Commerce and Technology
- Tatung High School

== Sponsorship ==
Tatung sponsored Wolverhampton Wanderers Football Club, an English Football League side, from 1982 to 1985.

== See also ==
- List of companies of Taiwan
