= Chou Yuan-chin =

Taiwanese politician

- 周源卿

Minister of the Atomic Energy Council of the Republic of China
- In office 1 February 2016 – 20 May 2016
- Preceded by: Tsai Chuen-horng
- Succeeded by: Hsieh Shou-shing

Deputy Minister of the Atomic Energy Council of the Republic of China
- In office 2012 – 31 January 2016
- Minister: Tsai Chuen-horng

Personal details
- Born: August 22, 1954 (age 71) Taichung, Taiwan
- Education: National Tsing Hua University (BS, MS); Massachusetts Institute of Technology (PhD)

Chou Yuan-chin (Chinese: 周源卿; pinyin: Zhōu Yuánqīng; born August 22, 1954) is a Taiwanese nuclear scientist. He was the Minister of the Atomic Energy Council in the Executive Yuan from 1 February to 20 May 2016.

== Early life and education ==
Chou was born in Taichung, Taiwan, on August 22, 1954. He graduated from National Tsing Hua University with a Bachelor of Science (B.S.) and a Master of Science (M.S.) in nuclear engineering in 1977 and 1979, respectively. He then completed doctoral studies in the United States, earning his Ph.D. in nuclear engineering from the Massachusetts Institute of Technology (MIT) in 1988.

== Early career ==
Chou had been an adjunct lecturer at the Department of Mechanical Engineering of Chung Cheng Institute of Technology in 1979–1981. In 1984–1985, he was the adjunct lecturer at the Department of Aerospace of Tamkang University and in 1991-1992 he was the adjunct associate professor at the Department of Mechanical Engineering of Chung Yuan Christian University.
