= Liu Wen-chung =

Taiwanese scientist and public official

Liu Wen-chung (Chinese: 劉文忠) is a Taiwanese scientist and public official serving as a deputy minister of the Atomic Energy Council.

Liu was a student of the Department of Applied Chemistry at Feng Chia University, completing his degree in 1981. He subsequently obtained a doctorate within the Institute of Atomic Science at National Tsing Hua University in 1991. Liu later worked for the Atomic Energy Council, including as leader of the AEC's Fuel Cycle and Materials Administration through 2019. Later that year, Liu was elevated as a deputy minister of the AEC.
