= Nuclear power in Taiwan =

Nuclear power plants in Taiwan (view)
Active plants
Closed plants
Unfinished plants

Nuclear power in Taiwan was part of the country's electricity production from 1977 to 2025. From 1984 on, Taiwan operated three nuclear plants with a total capacity of 5 GW. In 1985, nuclear power amounted for 52% of Taiwan's electricity production. With no further commissioned plants and increasing fossil energy generation, the share had dropped continuously to 8% in 2017. In 2023, nuclear energy made up 6.3 percent of Taiwan's generated electricity. The technology chosen for the reactors has been General Electric BWR technology for the Jinshan and Kuosheng plants, and Westinghouse PWR technology for the Maanshan Nuclear Power Plant.

Taiwan has not experienced any nuclear accident, but a power outage at Maanshan unit 1 in 2001 was classified as an INES 3 incident. Nevertheless, the fear that an earthquake could cause the release of radioactivity led to an anti-nuclear movement that eventually prevented the commissioning of Lungmen, the fourth constructed plant, in April 2014, despite its modern ABWR design. Active seismic faults run across the island, and anti-nuclear environmentalists argue Taiwan is unsuited for nuclear plants. A 2011 report by the Natural Resources Defense Council, an environmental advocacy group, evaluated the seismic hazard to reactors worldwide, as determined by the Global Seismic Hazard Assessment Program data, placed all of Taiwan's reactors within the highest risk group of 12 reactors within very high seismic hazard areas, along with some of Japan's reactors.

The 2016 presidential and legislative elections were won by a party whose key platform promises included phasing out nuclear power. In a 2018 referendum, voters adopted a proposal to retain nuclear power; however, in January 2019, the government stated that it would not extend the life of existing plants or restart construction on Lungmen. Another referendum in 2021 proposing to restart the construction of the Lungmen Nuclear Power Plant was rejected. As of May 18, 2025, Taiwan completed the phase-out of nuclear power, shutting down their final nuclear reactor at Maanshan Power Plant. An unsuccessful referendum in 2025 considered restarting operations at Maanshan, which had closed earlier that year. On 24 September 2026, the Taiwan Nuclear Safety Commission approved a preliminary plan for the restart of both units at Maanshan, despite the failed 2025 referendum.

== Organization ==
All plants were run by Taipower. Taiwan's Nuclear Safety Commission (NSC) is effectively the regulatory body, but plants are also subject to International Atomic Energy Agency safeguards.

== History ==
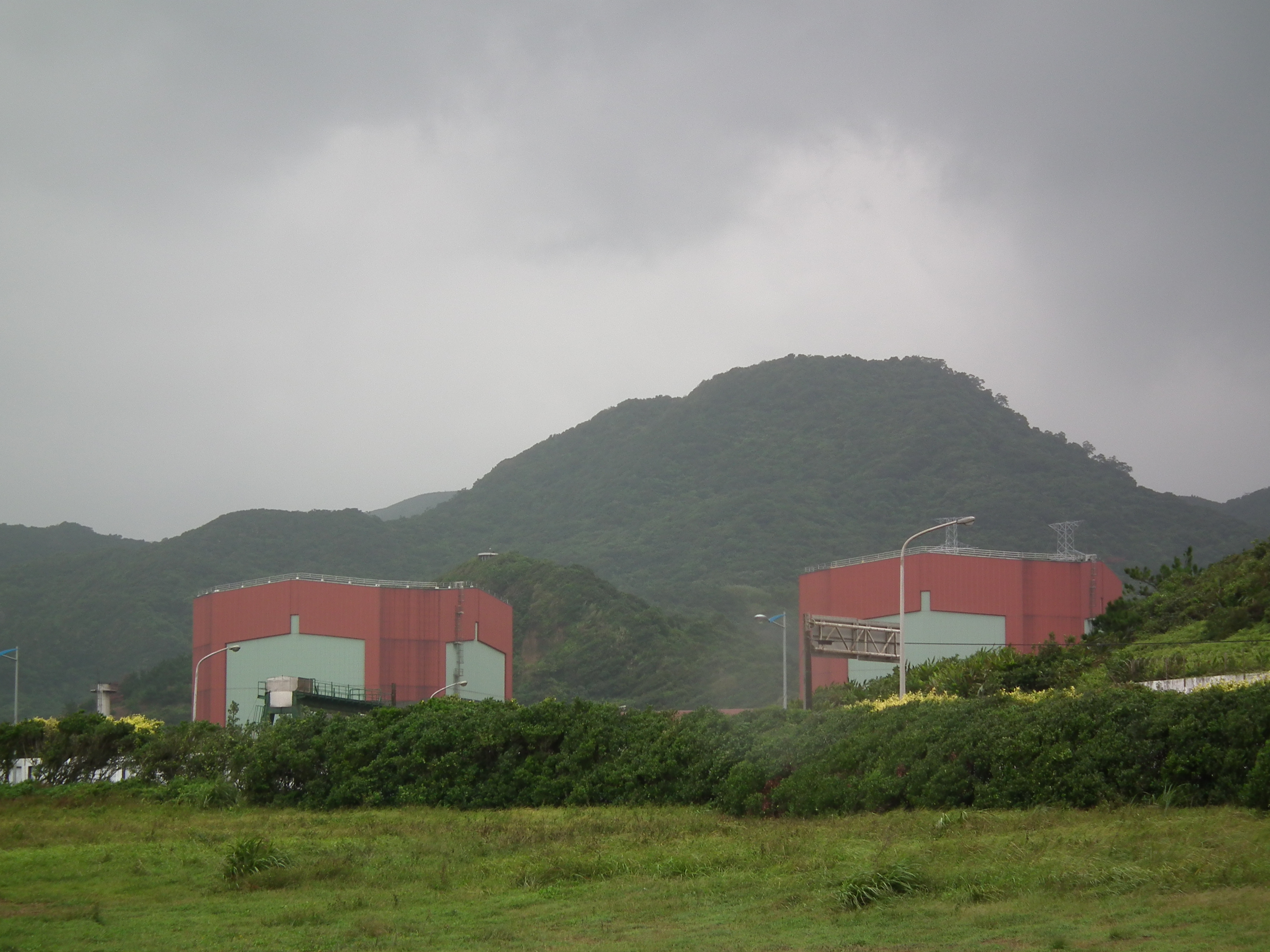
Kuosheng Nuclear Power Plant in Wanli, New Taipei.

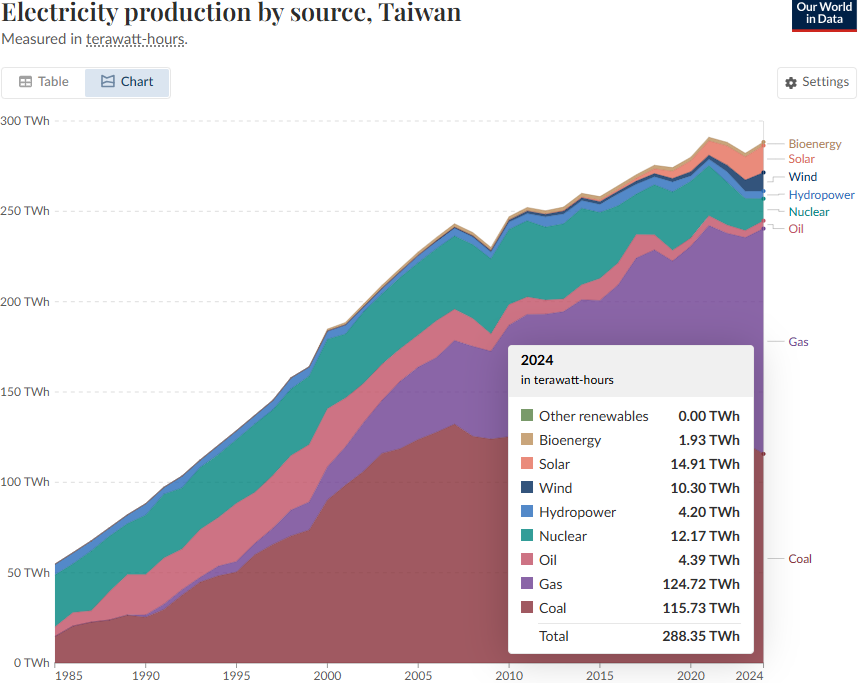
electricity production trend 1985-2024 (nuclear in green)

Taiwanese plants' performance has improved considerably. Their availability rose from 70% in the 1970s to 90% in the 1990s. Safety indices also improved as the number of scrams decreased (30 a year in 1984 to 2 or 3 a year now) and radioactive emissions decreased.

Funds are collected as part of nuclear electricity sales to pay for management of the spent fuel and decommissioning. This NT$196 billion plus (in 2009) fund is expected to cover all future liabilities.

During the peak of nuclear energy in Taiwan (1980s), nuclear power plants accounted for 52.4% of electricity generation. Nuclear power has declined in Taiwan from 14% in 1990 to 7.3% in 2005, having been partly replaced by coal that rose from 23% to 32% in the same period. Per capita carbon dioxide emissions are three times the world average and Taiwan ranked number one in annual increase of per capita carbon dioxide emissions in 2008.

Taiwanese plants are high performers, with above average 88.5% availability over 2005–2010.

By 2012, nuclear power provided 16% of electricity generation, with coal at 47% and natural gas at 16%. By 2023, only 6.3% of Taiwan's electricity was generated from nuclear power plants. In 2024, nuclear's power share declined to 4% in Taiwan, with renewable energy growing to 11%. Liquified natural gas (LNG) overtook coal as the dominant source of power generation in the same year.

Historically, a nuclear phase-out in Taiwan has been a large source of political debate. The Kuomintang (KMT) party is generally pro-nuclear, citing energy security concerns as one of their key reasons. The Democratic Progressive Party (DPP) is generally anti-nuclear, with stated commitments to the phase-out policy.

=== Post-Fukushima ===
Following the Fukushima nuclear accident in Japan, nuclear energy emerged as a contentious issue. In March 2011, around 2,000 anti-nuclear protesters demonstrated in Taiwan for an immediate halt to the construction of the island's fourth nuclear power plant. The protesters also opposed plans to extend the lifespan of three existing nuclear plants.

On the eve of World Environment Day in June 2011, environmental groups demonstrated against Taiwan's nuclear power policy. The Taiwan Environmental Protection Union, together with 13 environmental groups and legislators, gathered in Taipei with banners that read: "I love Taiwan, not nuclear disasters". They protested against the nation's three operating nuclear power plants and the construction of a fourth plant. They also called for "all nuclear power plants to be thoroughly re-evaluated and shut down immediately if they fail to pass safety inspections".

According to Wang To-far, economics professor at National Taipei University, "if a level-seven nuclear crisis were to happen in Taiwan, it would destroy the nation". George Hsu, a professor of applied economics at National Chung Hsing University in central Taiwan, said nuclear power plants in quake-prone areas need to be redesigned to make them more resistant, an investment that would reduce their original cost advantage.

The retirement of existing nuclear reactors was a significant issue in the 2012 presidential election. The 2016 election was won by the Democratic Progressive Party with a platform that included becoming a nuclear-free society within nine years. A referendum in 2018 voted to retain nuclear power in Taiwan, however in January 2019 the government stated that there would be no life-extensions for existing plants or restarts to building nuclear power plants.

On 19 May 2025, the only remaining active nuclear reactor, unit 2 of Maanshan Nuclear Power Plant, was disconnected from the grid and shutdown on the expiry of its 40-year operating licence. It was decommissioned.

A majority of voters in the 2025 Taiwanese referendum supported restarting operations at Maanshan. However, the result was not binding due to limited turnout. In March 2026, the Taiwan Power Company began researching options to restart Kuosheng and Maanshan. In August 2026, the Nuclear Safety Commission stated that Maanshan had met technical review requirements and would be approved to restart operations.

=== Lungmen Nuclear Power Plant ===
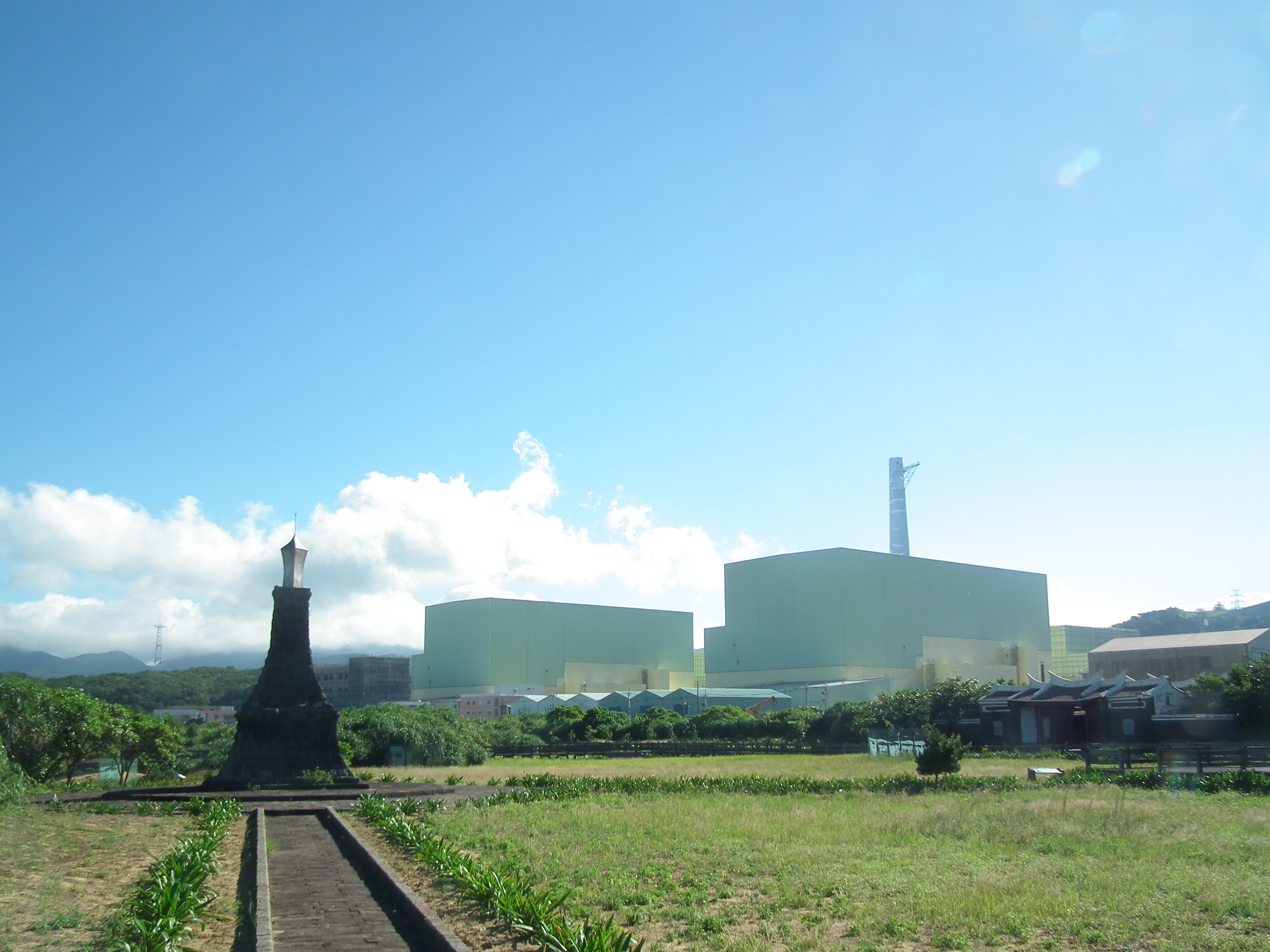
Lungmen Nuclear Power Plant in Fulong Beach, Gongliao, New Taipei.

A group of experts, scientists, and NGOs found about 40 flaws in the design, construction, and operating system of the Fourth Nuclear Power Plant.

Since 2011, many more Taiwanese began to support halting the plant construction, although the state-owned Taiwan Power Company said it will make electricity price increase by 40%.

In April 2014, the Taiwan government announced that construction on the plant would stop. The first reactor will be sealed after the completion of safety checks, and construction of the second reactor will be halted. A final decision may be subject to a national referendum. As of July 2014, no plan has been advanced for lay-up of the plant.

== List of nuclear power stations in Taiwan ==
| Station | Chinese | Net Capacity (MWe) | Location | Coordinates | Status | Closing date |
|---|---|---|---|---|---|---|
| Jinshan Nuclear Power Plant | 金山核能發電廠 (核一) | 1,272 | Shimen, New Taipei | 25°17′09″N 121°35′10″E | Decommissioned | 2018-12-05 (#1 Generating unit); 2019-07-15 (#2 Generating unit) |
| Kuosheng Nuclear Power Plant | 國聖核能發電廠 (核二) | 1,970 | Wanli, New Taipei | 25°12′10″N 121°39′45″E | Decommissioned | 2021-12-27 (#1 Generating unit); 2023-03-14 (#2 Generating unit) |
| Maanshan Nuclear Power Plant | 馬鞍山核能發電廠 (核三) | 1,902 | Hengchun, Pingtung | 21°57′30″N 120°45′5″E | Decommissioned | 2024-07-26 (#1 Generating Unit); 2025-05-17 (#2 Generating unit) |
| Lungmen Nuclear Power Plant | 龍門核能發電廠 (核四) | 2,700 | Gongliao, New Taipei | 25°2′19″N 121°55′27″E | Construction halted | |

=== Status of Reactors ===
Between 1977 and 1985, there were three operational sites involving six reactors: the sites included Chinshan, Kuosheng, and Maanshan. The proposed fourth reactor, Lungmen, was under construction beginning in 1999, but faced constant obstacles in its construction. The Chinshan plant began decommissioning in 2019, Kuosheng 1 followed soon after in 2021 and Kuosheng 2 was also shut down in 2023.

Construction of two Advancer Boiling Water Reactors (ABWR) at the Lungmen site (Fourth Nuclear Power Plant) began in 1999, but it faced challenges like political opposition and engineering delays. The government suspended this project in 2014, despite Unit 1 reaching pre-operational testing, due to public safety concerns and political controversy. The reactors were sealed a year later, and in 2019 Taipower ruled out completion (technical and economic difficulties). In a 2021 referendum, a majority of voters rejected a proposal to resume construction.

== Future energy options ==
In January 2015, DPP chairwoman Tsai Ing-wen said that her party aimed to phase out nuclear power in Taiwan by 2025.

In 2016, the DPP won the election and followed through on their promise of a nuclear-free homeland by passing an amendment to the Electricity Industry Act that required nuclear energy production to be phased out. This amendment was abolished only a few years later in December 2018 because of a pro-nuclear referendum, but the Minister of Economic Affairs, Shen Jong-chin, reiterated that nuclear power plants would still not be granted extensions or restarts.

On 24 September 2026, the Taiwan Nuclear Safety Commission approved a preliminary plan for the restart of both units at Maanshan Nuclear Power Plant, despite the failed 2025 referendum. That said, the commission added that Taiwan Power Co will have to carry out further inspections of the plant before submitting another report on implementation for review to the Nuclear Safety Commission. Placed on the backdrop of unstable fossil fuel prices regarding the 2026 conflict in the Middle East, AI driven tech energy damands, the recent restarting of nuclear power stations elsewhere, and the 2025 revision by the Legislative Yuan of the Nuclear Reactor Facilities Regulation Act to allow nuclear stations to renew or extend their licences beyond the 40 year maximum, the regulatory greenlight marks a reversal of the Democratic Progressive Party's anti nuclear "nuclear-free homeland". Restart of the Maanshan Nuclear Power Plant is targeted for 2028 by Minister of Economic Affairs Kung Ming-hsin as of September 2026.

== Research centers ==
As of July 2014, there were four research nuclear reactors in Taiwan producing up to 2.8 MW.

| School | School location | Research Reactor | Employer | Employer location |
|---|---|---|---|---|
| NTHU (HSP) | Hsinchu City, Hsinchu, TW | THOR with TRIGA | Taipower {Bal. of P.} | Taipei City, Taipei, TW |
| NCKU (STSP) | East District, Tainan, TW | TRIGA (for H.I.: 8058 TYO & etc.) | Taipower {Deng Ji.} | Taipei City, Taipei, TW |
| NTOU | Zhongzheng, Keelung, TW | Water tun.(NX)/Ship basin(CATIA) | CSBC | Kaohsiung City, KHH, TW |
| NKMU | Nanzih District, KHH, TW | Water tun.(NX)/Ship basin(CATIA) | Horizon Yachts | Kaohsiung City, KHH, TW |

== Nuclear waste disposal ==
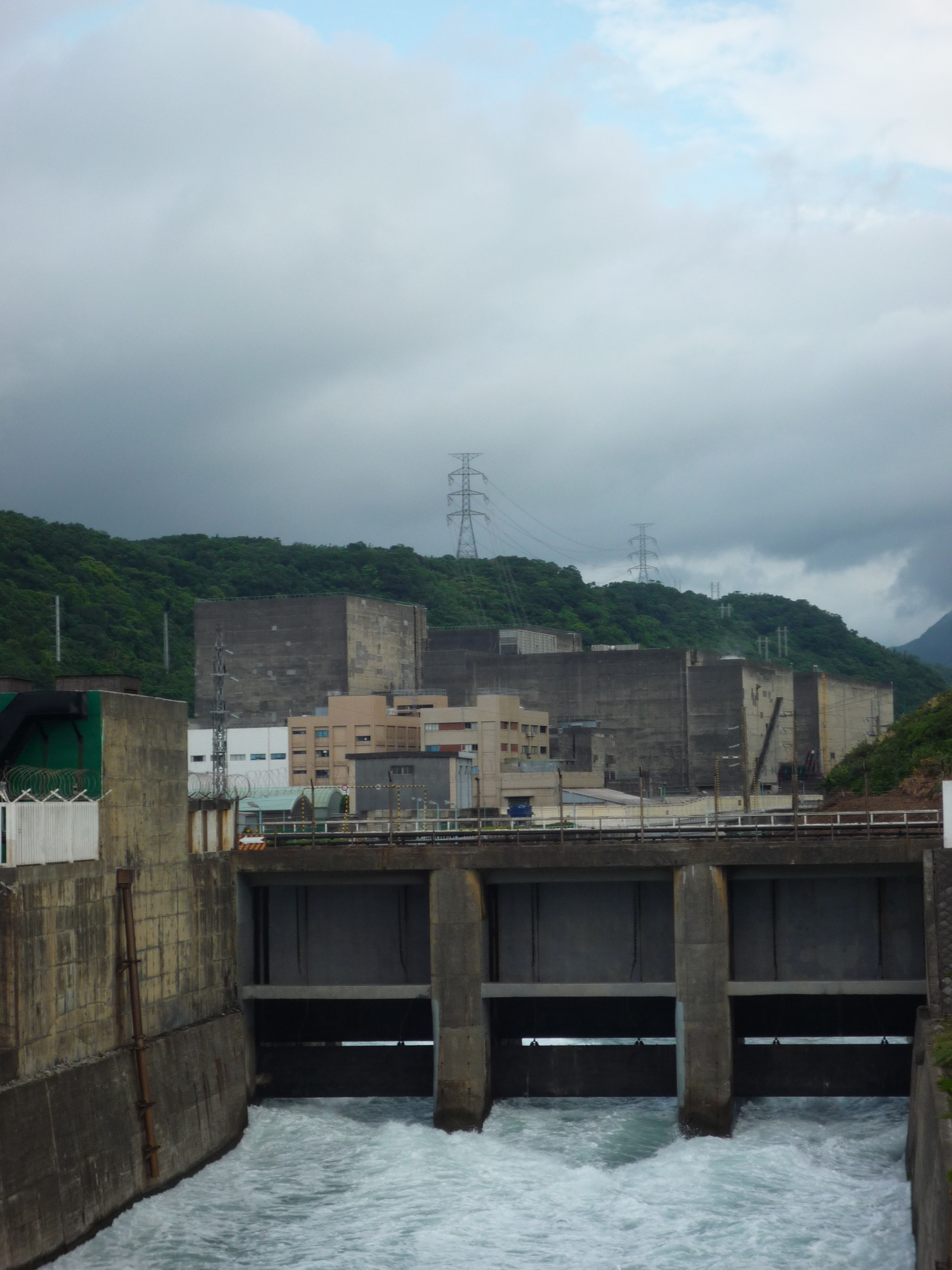
Jinshan Nuclear Power Plant in Shimen, New Taipei.

The Lanyu nuclear waste storage facility on Lanyu Island began operations in 1982. The storage plant is at the southern tip of the 45-square-kilometer island, which is located off the southeastern coast of Taiwan proper. The plant receives nuclear waste from three nuclear power plants operated by state utility Taipower. Islanders did not have a say in the decision to locate the facility on the island.

In 2002, almost 2,000 protesters, including aboriginal residents of the island, protested in front of the storage plant against the government's failure to fulfill its pledge to remove 100,000 barrels of low-level nuclear waste from the island by the end of 2002. In a bid to allay safety concerns, Taipower has pledged to repackage the waste since many of the iron barrels used for storage have become rusty from the island's salty and humid air. Taipower has for years been exploring ways to ship the nuclear waste overseas for final storage, but plans to store the waste in an abandoned North Korean coal mine have met with strong protests from neighboring South Korea and Japan due to safety and environmental concerns, while storage in Russia or mainland China is complicated by political factors. Taipower is "trying to convince the islanders to extend the storage arrangement for another nine years in exchange for payment of NT$200 million (about $5.7 million)".

About 100,000 barrels of nuclear waste from the nation's three operational nuclear power plants have been stored at the Lanyu complex. A report released in November 2011 said a radioactive leak had been detected outside the facility and this has added to residents’ concerns. In February 2012, hundreds of Tao Aborigines living on Lanyu held a protest outside the Lanyu nuclear waste storage facility, calling on Taiwan Power Co. to remove nuclear waste from the island as soon as possible.

In late 2019, not long before being re-elected, Tsai Ing-Wen offered a financial compensation to the Tao community. Community elders have seen this as an attempt to buy them off and have therefore rejected the offer and staged protests in front of the Executive Yuan, asking for removal of the waste.

When Taiwan ordered French uranium in the 1980s it was under the condition that the French would take back the nuclear waste for reprocessing at the La Hague site however France did not honor its obligations when it came time to reprocessing the material. As of 2021 the material scheduled for reprocessing in France still sits in temporary containment ponds in Taiwan.

One case study detailing a failure to dispose of nuclear waste properly comes from the early 1980s, where radioactive scrap metal and steel from nuclear power plant waste was sold and melted in rebar before being used in construction of buildings. Over one thousand apartments and over 200 building blocks in residential areas were found to have been built with these contaminated steels, causing more than 15,000 students and citizens to be exposed to excessive low dose-rate gamma-irradiation for years. High levels of radiation were detected in one of these structures by accident in 1985, but the public wasn't made aware until seven years later in 1992. The lack of transparency and this incident caused more distrust toward nuclear energy's safety and use in Taiwan.

== Anti-nuclear movement ==
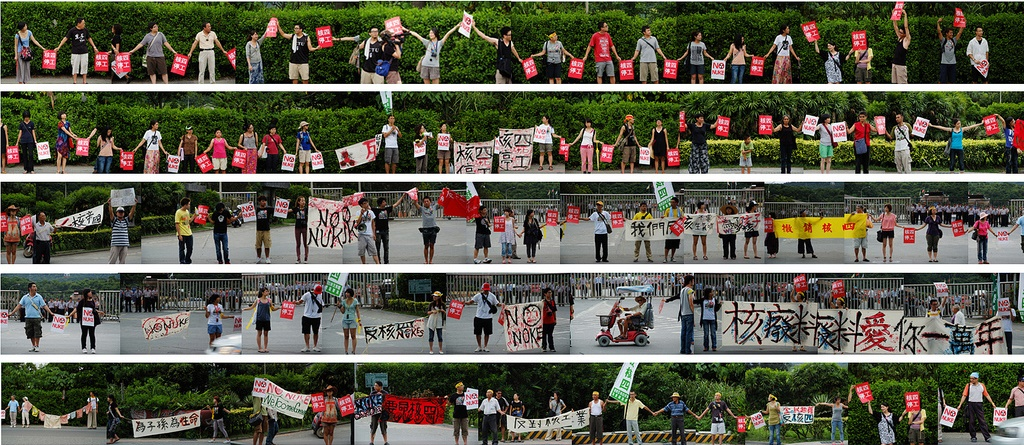
Human chain blocking main entrance to the 4th nuclear power plant

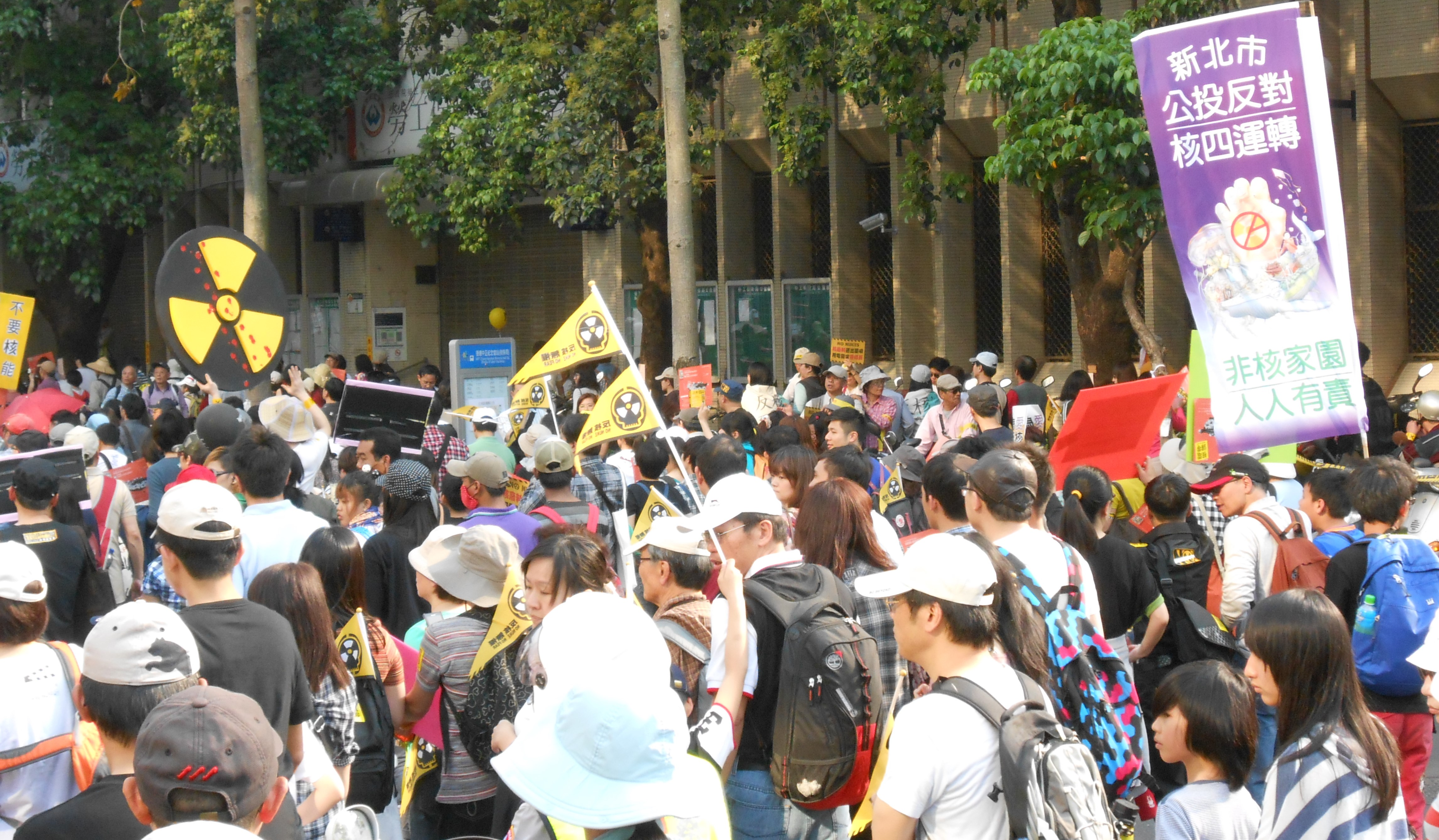
Public demonstration against the 4th nuclear power plant

=== 2010 ===
On August 29, 2010, anti-nuclear protesters formed a human chain blocking the main entrance to the Fourth Nuclear Power Plant. Employees were forced to use alternate accesses.

=== 2011 ===
In March 2011, around 2,000 anti-nuclear protesters demonstrated in Taiwan for an immediate end to the construction of the island's fourth nuclear power plant. The protesters were also opposed to lifespan extensions for three existing nuclear plants.

In April 2011, an estimated 5,000 people joined an anti-nuclear protest in Taipei City. This was part of a nationwide "No Nuke Action" protest against the construction of a Fourth Nuclear Plant and in favour of a more sustainable energy policy.

On the eve of World Environment Day in June 2011, environmental groups demonstrated against Taiwan's nuclear power policy. The Taiwan Environmental Protection Union, together with 13 environmental groups and legislators, gathered in Taipei and protested against extending the life of the nation's three operating nuclear power plants and the construction of a fourth plant.

=== 2012 ===
In March 2012, about 2,000 people staged an anti-nuclear protest in Taipei on the anniversary of the 2011 Tōhoku earthquake and tsunami. The protesters renewed calls for a nuclear-free island. They wanted the government to scrap a plan to operate the newly constructed Fourth Nuclear Power Plant. Aboriginal protesters demanded that 100,000 barrels of nuclear waste stored on Orchid Island be removed. Authorities had failed in the prior decade to find an alternative storage site.

=== 2013 ===
In March 2013, 68,000 Taiwanese protested across major cities against the island's fourth nuclear power plant, which is under construction. Taiwan's three existing nuclear plants are near the ocean, and faults under the island cause concern about safety.

On 19 May 2013, 10,000 people participated in a protest in Taipei, organized by an environmental protection organization, against the construction of the fourth nuclear power plant. Protesters held signs that said "No Nuclear Power" and "We Don't Want Another Fukushima."

On 26 May 2013, hundreds of Taiwanese protested in Taipei calling to vote down the nuclear power referendum bill and to stop the construction of Taiwan's fourth nuclear power plant. Protesters form a big yellow words displaying STOP in front of Legislative Yuan. The protest came a few days before the plan by Kuomintang to push through a bill to hold a referendum in Taiwan and decide the fate of the fourth nuclear power plant.

On 2 August 2013, nearly 100 activists from Taiwan Anti-Nuclear Action League protested in front of the Legislative Yuan against the fourth nuclear power plant. They urged the government to immediately stop the project. The league included the Taiwan Environmental Protection Union, the Humanistic Education Foundation and the Green Citizens' Action Alliance.

On 15 August 2013, protestors held a press conference in Taipei to demand Taipower to stop further electricity price hikes, stop construction on the fourth nuclear power plant and stop lying to customers.

A demonstration about the Fourth Nuclear Power Plant was held on 24 August 2013 at Chiang Kai-shek Memorial Hall.

=== 2014 ===
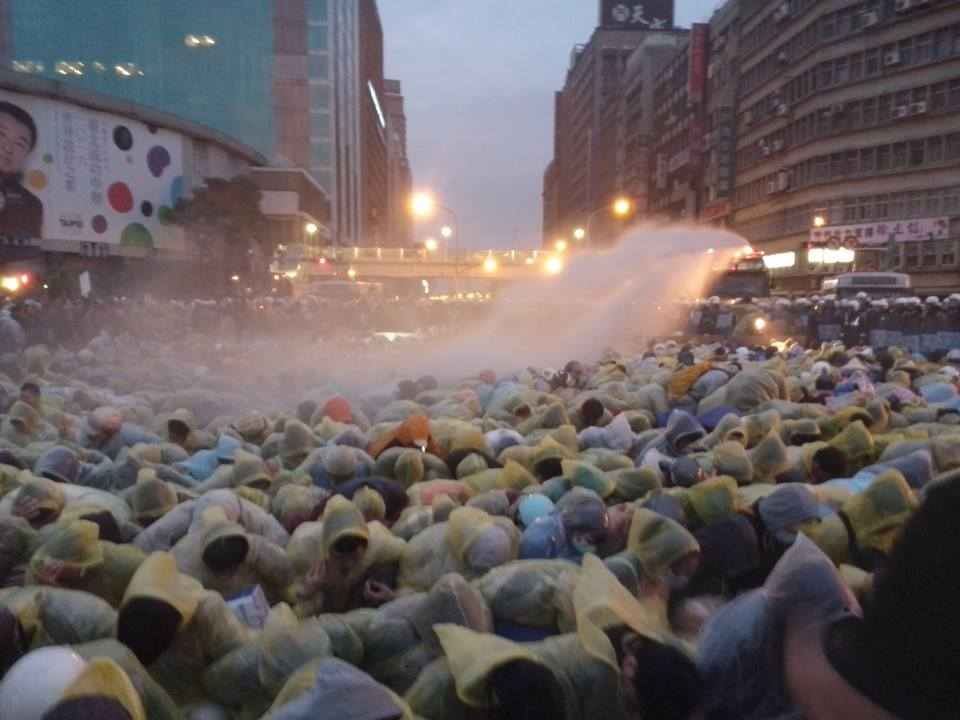
Protesters shot with water cannons

In March 2014, around 130,000 Taiwanese marched for an anti-nuclear protest around Taiwan. They demanded that the government abandon nuclear power in Taiwan. The march came ahead of the 3rd anniversary of the Fukushima disaster. According to organizers, around 50,000 people marched in Taipei while another three events held in other Taiwanese cities were attended by around 30,000 people. Participating organizations included Green Citizen Action's Alliance, Homemakers United Foundation, Taiwan Association for Human Rights and Taiwan Environmental Protection Union.

=== 2018 ===
On March 11, 2018, protesters took to the streets to oppose Taipower's state-backed re-launch one of the reactors at Kuosheng Nuclear Plant, having been re-galvanized among others, by the magnitude 7.3 earthquake having hit the area only a few weeks earlier. Kuosheng went online nevertheless and produced 8 TWh yearly electric output.

== See also ==
- Atomic Energy Council
- Taiwan Power Company
- List of power stations in Taiwan
- Energy in Taiwan
- Nuclear power debate
- Low-Level Radioactive Waste Storage Site
- Nuclear energy policy
- Renewable energy in Taiwan
- Ministry of Science and Technology (Taiwan)

== Bibliography ==
- Uranium Information Center: Nuclear energy in Taiwan
