= Taiwan Power Company =

State-owned energy company in Taiwan

Taiwan Power Company 台灣電力公司
- Industry: Electric power
- Predecessor: Taiwan Power
- Founded: 1 May 1946; 80 years ago, in Taipei, Taiwan
- Headquarters: Taiwan Power Building, Taipei, Taiwan
- Area served: Taiwan area (Taiwan and Fujian)
- Key people: Chu Wen-chen (Chairman); Chu Wen-chen (President); Chen Pu-tsan (Vice President)
- Revenue: NT$ 547,164 million (2012)
- Total assets: NT$ 1,624,314 million (2012)
- Total equity: NT$ 282,642 million (2012)
- Owner: 96.92% government (Ministry of Economic Affairs), 3.08% public
- Number of employees: 27,261 (2012)
- Website: taipower.com.tw

The Taiwan Power Company (TPC; Chinese: 台灣電力公司; pinyin: Táiwān Diànlì Gōngsī; Pe̍h-ōe-jī: Tâi-oân Tiān-le̍k Kong-si), also known by the short name Taipower (台電; Táidiàn; Tâi-tiān), is a state-owned electric power industry providing electricity to Taiwan and its off-shore islands.

== History ==
Taipower was established on 1 May 1946. Its origins can be traced to 1919 when Taiwan Electric Power Co. was founded during Japanese colonial rule. In the subsequent decades, the Sun Moon Lake hydropower project was completed, and the company built a transmission line that connected northern Taiwan with the south.

In 1994, a measure which allowed independent power producers (IPP's) to provide up to 20 percent of Taiwan's electricity should have ended the monopoly. On 1 October 2012, Taipower allied with Taiwan Water Corporation to provide cross-agency integrated services called Water and Power Associated Service that accepts summary transactions between the two utilities. On 11 October 2012, the Economics Committee of the Legislative Yuan cut Taipower's budget for power purchases from IPP.

In July 2015, the Executive Yuan approved the amendments to the Electricity Act which were proposed by the Ministry of Economic Affairs, which will divide Taipower into two separate business groups in the next five to nine years: a power generation company and a power grid company. The measures were taken to improve efficiency within the company and to encourage positive competition within the industry.

On 20 October 2016, the Executive Yuan passed an amendments to the Electricity Act according to which Taipower will be divided into subsidiary companies in 6–9 years.

== Operations ==
Taipower operates both of Taiwan's active nuclear power plants. It also operates coal power plants, but these are planned to be shut down in favor of natural gas turbines.

The company is expecting its first deliveries of liquefied natural gas (LNG) in 2023 as Taipower is moving away from coal for power generation.

The Taipower headquarters is housed in a 27-story building located in Zhongzheng District, Taipei. Completed in 1983, it was then the tallest building in Taiwan and the first building to surpass the 100 meter height.

=== Financials ===
As of 2019, Taipower is the only Taiwanese state-owned company that is unprofitable, reporting a loss of NT$29.7 billion (US$955 million) during the first six months of 2019, a minus of NT$5.7 billion compared to the same period of 2018. The company attributed this on rising fuel prices and various anti-pollution measures which increased the costs of energy production.

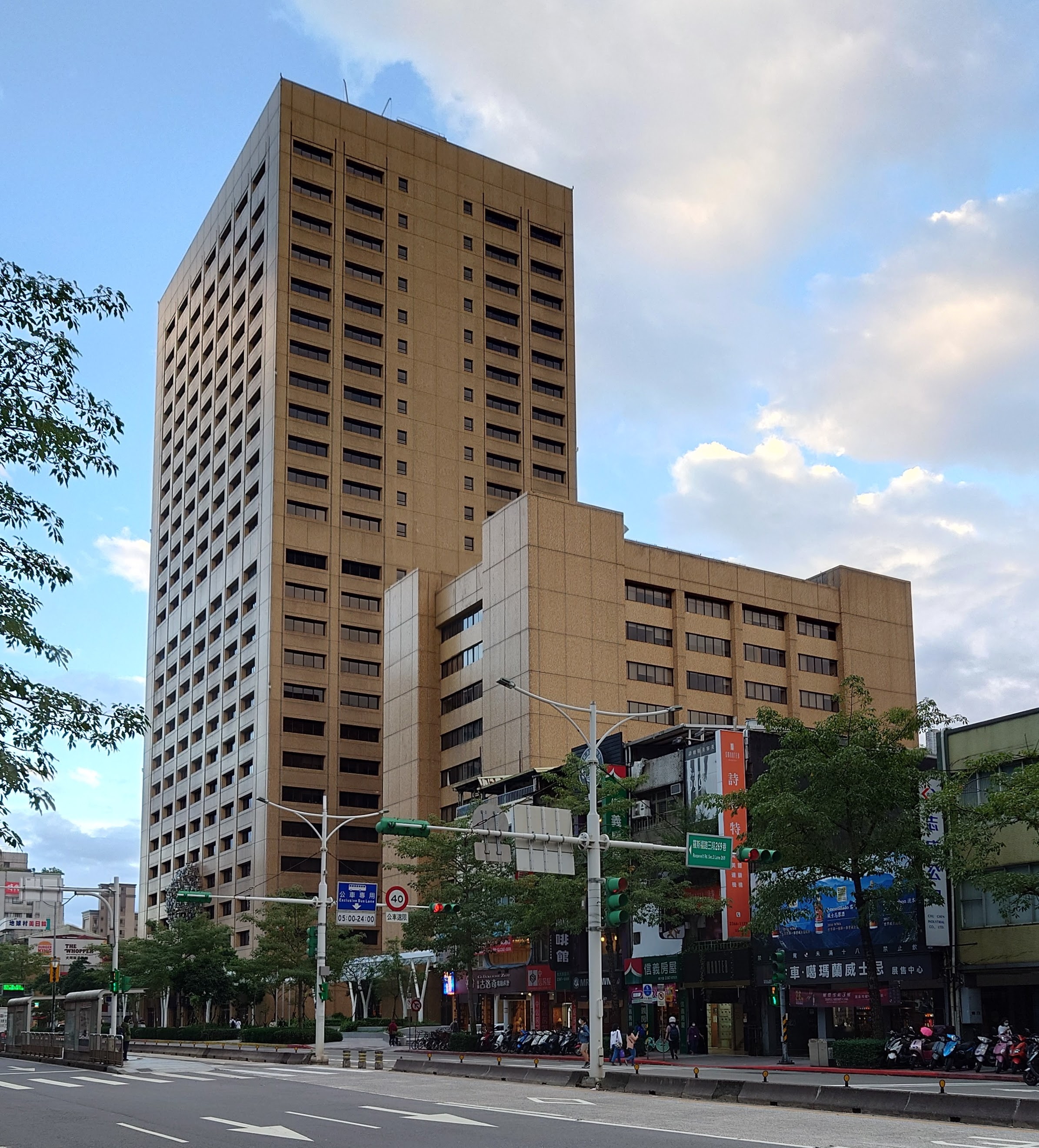
Taiwan Power Building (headquarters)

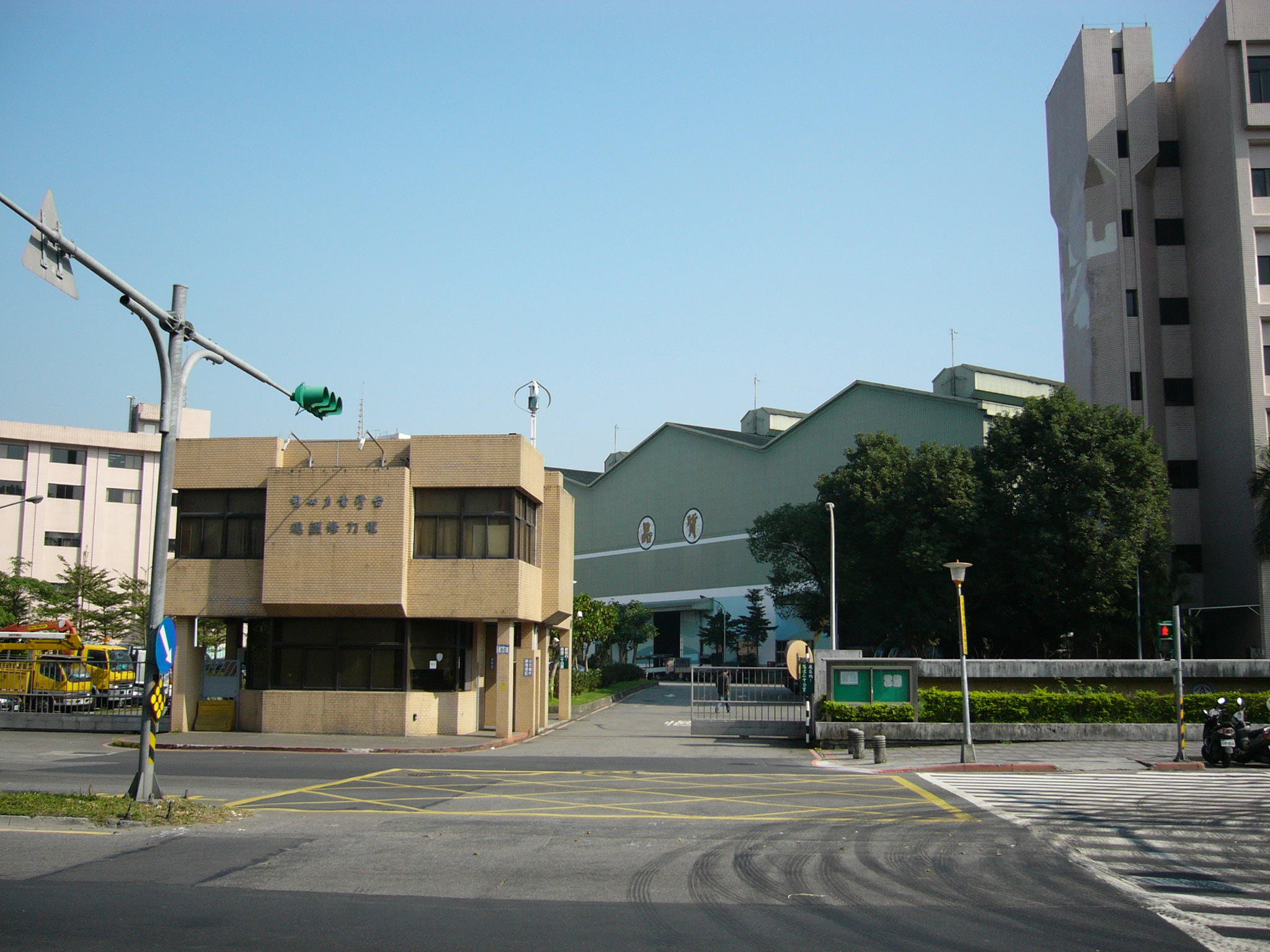
Department of Maintenance

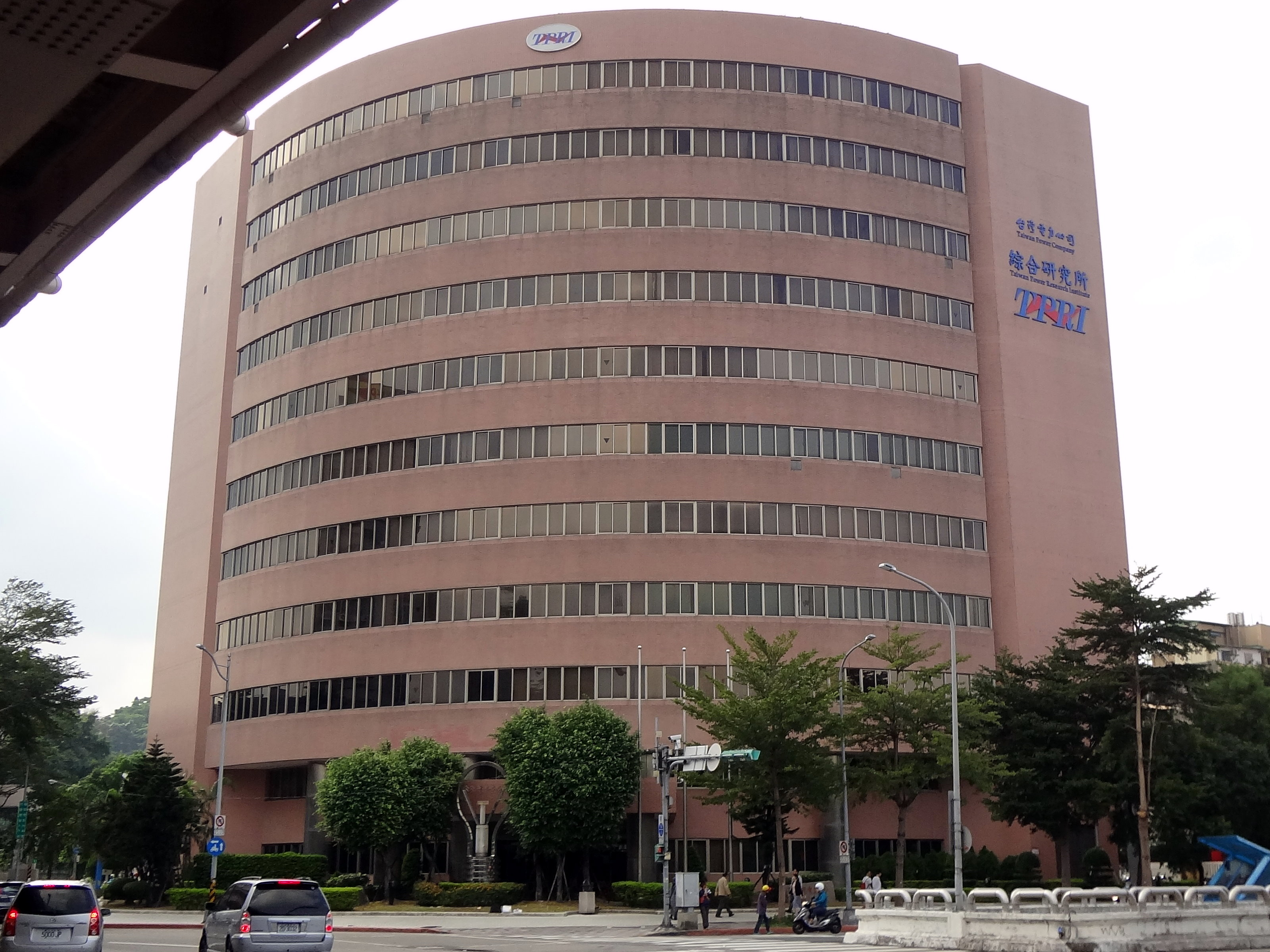
Taiwan Power Research Institute

== Baseball team ==
Taipower baseball team

Information
- League: Popcorn League (since 2014)
- Location: Kaohsiung
- Founded: 1948

Current uniforms
Home

The Taiwan Power Company baseball team (Chinese: 台灣電力公司棒球隊), also known as the Taipower baseball team (台電棒球隊), is one of the two amateur baseball teams in Taiwan's First Division amateur baseball league that are owned by a government sponsored corporation. Both founded in 1948, the team and Taiwan Cooperative Bank have a long tradition of being the two dominant baseball teams in Taiwan's baseball history. At one point, they were known as TCB of the North, Taipower of the South (北合庫，南台電). Although many of its most prominent players left for professional career after the founding of the Chinese Professional Baseball League (CPBL) and struggled to keep its players on the team, it is still considered one of the best teams in the amateur or semi-professional leagues. It also has been training some of the best Taiwanese baseball players, and many of them are still valuable players on their current teams.

In 1945, a group of TPC employees who were enthusiastic of baseball formed the Kaohsiung Power Baseball Team, which would later form the core of Taipower Baseball Team. After many years of development and recruiting many promising players, the team rose to prominence in the amateur league, and was renamed Taipower Baseball Team since its roster included not only players from Kaohsiung, but also other parts of Taiwan. It has since been in virtually every amateur seasons and tournaments, and has won many of them. As of 2023, the team is part of the semi-professional Popcorn League established in 2014.

== Organizational structure ==
- Headquarters
  - Committees
  - Department of Nuclear and Fossil Power Projects
    - Construction Office
  - Legal Affairs Office
  - New Business Development Office
  - Department of Civil Service Ethics
  - Department of Human Resources
    - Training Institute
  - Department of Accounting
  - Department of Industrial Safety and Health
  - Department of Public Relations
  - Department of Environmental Protection
  - Department of Information Management
    - Data Processing Centers
  - Department of Construction
    - Construction Office
    - Construction Work Office
  - Department of Power Development
  - Department of Finance
  - Department of Materials
  - Department of Fuels
    - Liaison Office in Australia
  - Department of Corporate Planning
  - Secretariat
- Distribution and Service Division
  - 策劃室
  - 業務處
    - （下轄基隆、北北、北西、北市、北南、桃園、新竹、苗栗、臺中、彰化、南投、雲林、嘉義、新營、臺南、鳳山、高雄、屏東、臺東、花蓮、宜蘭、澎湖、金門、馬祖區營業處）
  - 配電處
- Transmission System Division
  - 策劃室
  - 供電處
    - （下轄基隆、臺北、新竹、臺中、新營、高雄六個區域調度中心及臺北、新桃、臺中、嘉南、高屏、花東六個供電區營運處）
  - 輸變電工程處
    - （下轄北區、中區、南區施工處）
  - 系統規劃處
  - 電力通信處
    - （下轄臺北、新竹、臺中、嘉南、高屏、花東六個通信區）
  - 電力調度處
    - （下轄臺北、高雄中央調度中心）
  - 電驛室
- Nuclear Power Division
  - 核能發電緊急計畫執行委員會
  - 核能安全委員會
  - 策劃室
  - 核能發電處
    - （下轄第二、第三核能發電廠、龍門資產管理中心，及放射實驗室）
  - 核能安全處
  - 核能後端營運處
    - （下轄第一核能發電廠、蘭嶼低放貯存場）
  - 核能技術處
- Power Generation Division
  - 策劃室
  - 發電處
    - （下轄協和、林口、大潭、通霄、臺中、興達、南部、大林、尖山、塔山火力發電廠，及桂山、石門、卓蘭、大甲溪、萬大、明潭兼大觀、曾文、高屏、東部、蘭陽水力發電廠）
  - 電力修護處
    - （下轄中部、南部分處）
  - 再生能源處
    - （下轄各風力、太陽光電、地熱發電廠）
- Taiwan Power Research Institute

== See also ==
- Taiwan Power Company F.C.
- Taiwan Power Company Baseball Team
- List of power stations in Taiwan
- Electricity sector in Taiwan
- Energy in Taiwan
- Nuclear power in Taiwan
- Renewable energy in Taiwan
- List of companies of Taiwan
