= Nuclear Safety Commission (Taiwan) =

Government agency of Taiwan

Coordinates: 25°0′11.37″N 121°31′35.51″E

- 核能安全委員會; Yuánzǐnéng Wěiyuánhuì (Mandarin); Ngièn-chṳ́-nèn Vî-yèn-fi (Hakka)

Agency overview
- Formed: 16 May 1955
- Jurisdiction: Taiwan
- Headquarters: Yonghe, New Taipei
- Employees: 1,160
- Ministers responsible: Hsieh Shou-shing, Minister; Chang Ching-wen, Liu Wen-chung, Deputy Ministers
- Parent agency: Executive Yuan
- Website: www.nusc.gov.tw

The Nuclear Safety Commission (NSC; Chinese: 核能安全委員會; Tongyong Pinyin: Hénéng Āncyuán Wěiyuánhuèi; Tâi-lô: Hi̍k-lîng An-tsuân Úi-uân-huē) is an independent government agency of the Executive Yuan of Taiwan which is responsible for atomic safety, development and regulations. It also conducts research and development into atomic technologies. It is affiliated with IAEA by special agreements to safeguard the peaceful development of the nuclear energy by the Taiwan government.

== History ==
The agency was created in 1955 as the Atomic Energy Council by the Executive Yuan. Since then, it has assisted industry in developing nuclear power for commercial use and allowed universities to conduct research into atomic energy. On 27 September 2023, the agency is renamed to Nuclear Safety Commission.

The agency is still primarily responsible for the supervision of nuclear power plants, nuclear facilities, and radiation workplaces. It also strictly implement the laws for nuclear safety control, radiation protection, environmental detection, and proper administration of radioactive waste management to ensure the safety of nuclear applications, general public and investigate applications for atomic energy.

== Administrative structure ==
The agency is organized into the following areas.

=== Departments ===
- Department of Nuclear Technology
- Department of Radiation Protection
- Department of Nuclear Regulation
- Department of Planning

=== Offices ===
- Office of Security
- Office of Personnel
- Office of Accounting
- Secretariat

=== Agencies ===
- Radiation Monitoring Center
- Fuel Cycle and Materials Administration
- National Atomic Research Institute

=== Advisory committees ===
- Advisory Committee on Nuclear Legislation
- Advisory Committee on Nuclear Facility Safety
- Advisory Committee on Ionizing Radiation Safety
- Advisory Committee on Radioactive Materials Safety
- Supervising Committee on Nuclear Safety of the Lungmen Station
- Advisory Committee on Nuclear Accident Investigation and Evaluation
- Evaluation Committee on Research and Development Achievements
- Advisory Committee on Handling of State Compensation Cases

== List of ministers ==
No.	Name	Term of office		Days	Cabinet
1	Chang Chi-yun (張其昀)	2 June 1955	July 1958		Yu Hung-chun
2	Mei Yi-chi (梅貽琦)	July 1958	19 May 1962		Chen Cheng II
—	Li Hsi-mou (李熙謀)	7 June 1962	27 February 1963	266	Chen Cheng II
3	Huang Chi-lu (黃季陸)	28 February 1963	19 April 1966	1147	Chen Cheng II; Yen Chia-kan
4	Yen Chen-hsing (閻振興)	20 April 1966	5 December 1971	2056	Yen Chia-kan
5	Chien Shih-Liang (錢思亮)	6 December 1971	9 July 1981	3504	Yen Chia-kan; Chiang Ching-kuo; Sun Yun-suan
6	Yen Chen-hsing (閻振興)	10 July 1981	1 June 1990	3249	Sun Yun-suan; Yu Kuo-hua; Lee Huan; Hau Pei-tsun
7	Hsu Yi-yun (許翼雲)	2 June 1990	10 June 1996	2200	Hau Pei-tsun; Lien Chan
8	Hu Chin-piao (胡錦標)	10 June 1996	19 May 2000	1440	Lien Chan; Vincent Siew
9	Hsia Te-yu (夏德鈺)	20 May 2000	6 March 2001	291	Tang Fei; Chang Chun-hsiung I
10	Hu Chin-piao (胡錦標)	7 March 2001	31 January 2002	331	Chang Chun-hsiung I
11	Ouyang Min-shen (歐陽敏盛)	1 February 2002	20 May 2007	1935	Yu Shyi-kun; Frank Hsieh; Su Tseng-chang I
12	Su Shian-jang (蘇獻章)	21 May 2007	19 May 2008	365	Chang Chun-hsiung II
13	Tsai Chuen-horng (蔡春鴻)	20 May 2008	31 January 2016	2813	Liu Chao-shiuan; Wu Den-yih; Sean Chen; Jiang Yi-huah; Mao Chi-kuo
14	Chou Yuan-chin (周源卿)	1 February 2016	19 May 2016	109	Chang San-cheng
15	Hsieh Shou-shing (謝曉星)	20 May 2016	11 January 2023	2427	Lin Chuan; William Lai; Su Tseng-chang II
16	Chang Ching-wen (張靜文)	31 January 2023	26 September 2023	238	Chen Chien-jen
17	Chen Tung-yang (陳東陽)	27 September 2023	14 August 2024	322	Chen Chien-jen; Cho Jung-tai
--	Chang Hsin (張欣)	15 August 2024	Incumbent	724	Cho Jung-tai

== Transportation ==
The council is near Fuhe Bridge, Yonghe District, New Taipei City.

== See also ==
- Longmen Nuclear Power Plant
- Nuclear power in Taiwan
