= Premier of Taiwan =

Head of government

President of the Executive Yuan
- 行政院院長
- National Emblem of the Republic of China

- Flag of the Republic of China

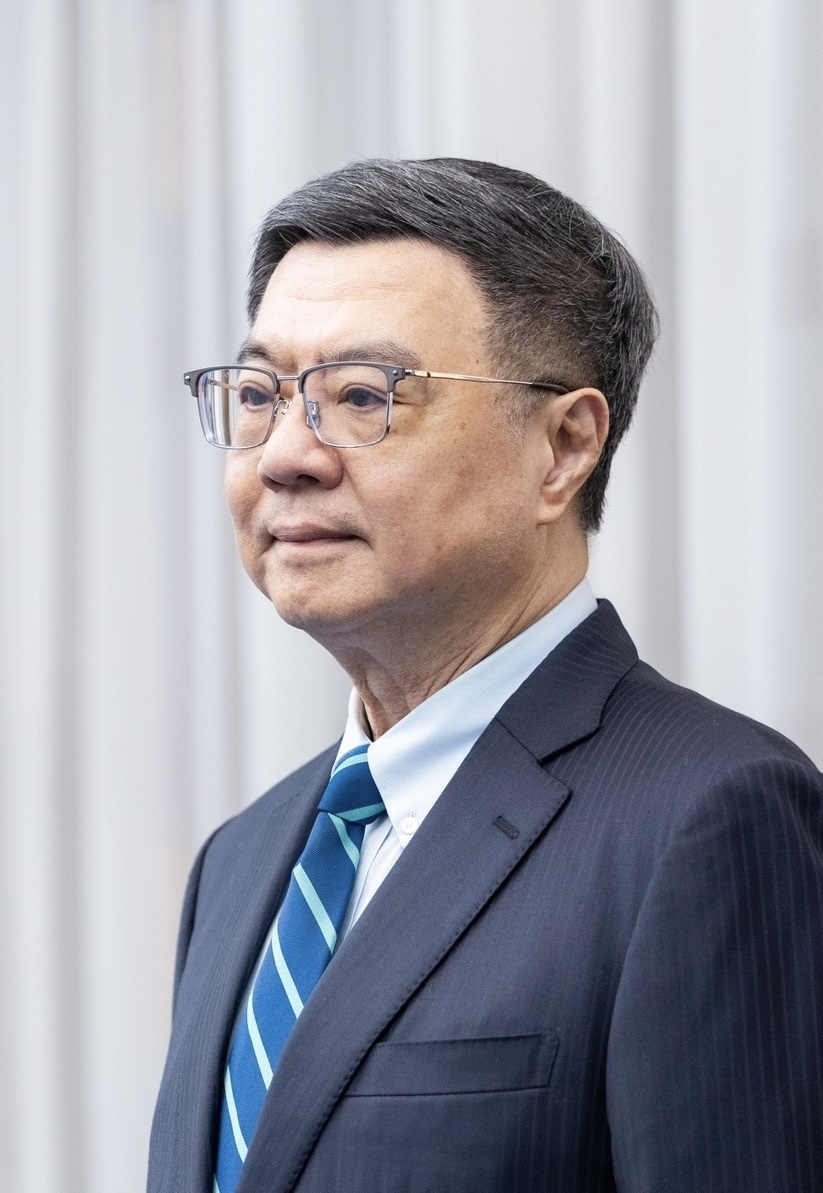
- Incumbent; Cho Jung-tai since 20 May 2024
- Executive Yuan
- Style: Mr. Premier (informal); His Excellency (diplomatic)
- Status: Head of government
- Reports to: Legislative Yuan
- Seat: Zhongzheng District, Taipei
- Appointer: President
- Term length: No fixed term
- Constituting instrument: Constitution of the Republic of China and the Additional Articles
- Precursor: Prime Minister of the Imperial Cabinet
- Inaugural holder: Tang Shaoyi (as Premier of Cabinet); Weng Wenhao (1947 Constitution)
- Formation: 12 March 1912; 114 years ago (Establishment by the Beiyang government in Mainland China); 25 October 1945; 81 years ago (Note: In colonial Taiwan, the post Governor-General of Taiwan was established on 10 May 1895.) (ROC handover); 24 May 1948; 78 years ago (current form)
- Abolished: 1 October 1949; 77 years ago (Mainland China)
- Succession: Premier of the People's Republic of China (after 1949, Mainland China)
- Unofficial names: Premier of Taiwan; Prime Minister of Taiwan
- Deputy: Vice Premier
- Salary: 3,728,835 New Taiwan dollars/US$121,500 annually
- Website: english.ey.gov.tw

President of the Executive Yuan
- Traditional Chinese: 行政院院長
- Simplified Chinese: 行政院院长
- Literal meaning: Executive Court Court-Chief
Transcriptions
Standard Mandarin
- Hanyu Pinyin: Xíngzhèng Yuàn Yuànzhǎng
- Wade–Giles: Hsing^{2}-chêng^{3}-yüan^{4}-chang^{3}
Hakka
- Pha̍k-fa-sṳ: Hàng-chṳn Yen Yen-tshòng
Yue: Cantonese
- Jyutping: Hang4-Zing3 Jyun2 Jyun2-zeung2
Southern Min
- Hokkien POJ: Hêng-chèng Īⁿ Īⁿ-tiúⁿ
- Tâi-lô: Hîng-tsìng Īnn Īnn-tiúnn

Alternative Chinese name
- Traditional Chinese: 閣揆
- Simplified Chinese: 阁揆
- Literal meaning: Cabinet Premier
Transcriptions
Standard Mandarin
- Hanyu Pinyin: Gékuí
- Wade–Giles: Ko^{2}-k'ui^{2}
Hakka
- Pha̍k-fa-sṳ: Kok-khùi
Yue: Cantonese
- Jyutping: Gok3-kwai4
Southern Min
- Hokkien POJ: Koh-kûi
- Tâi-lô: Koh-kûi

The premier of the Republic of China, officially the president of the Executive Yuan (Chinese: 行政院院長), is the head of government of Taiwan. As the leader of the Executive Yuan, the premier is nominally the principal advisor to the president and positioned as the head of the central government, appointed by the president without approval by the Legislative Yuan.

The current premier of Taiwan is Cho Jung-tai, who took office on 20 May 2024.

== History and development ==
During Japanese colonial rule over Taiwan, executive power was vested in the governor-general of Taiwan; the post was formed on 10 May 1895 as the governors-general were members of the Diet, civilian officials, Japanese nobles or generals. They exercised their power on behalf of the sovereign of Taiwan (the emperor of Japan) until the dissolution of the empire. Taiwan's head of government was then represented by the administration of the Republic of China under T. V. Soong of the Executive Yuan, after the handover in 1945, in which the post was originally founded in 1928 in Mainland China. Weng Wenhao became the first premier in the 1947 Constitution of the Republic of China in both Mainland China and Taiwan, but Yan Xishan also served as premier during the ROC government's retreat to Taiwan in 1949; the first president to take office after the government relocated to Taiwan was Chen Cheng. The sovereignty of Taiwan and Penghu was renounced by Japan in 1952.

== Constitutional roles ==
The premier presides over the Executive Yuan Council, which makes up the official cabinet. The vice premier, ministers, and chairpersons of the Executive Yuan Council are appointed by the president on the recommendation of the premier. The premier's official duties also include presenting administrative policies and reports to legislators, responding to the interpellations of legislators (similar to Question Time in some parliamentary systems), and, with the approval of the president, asking legislators to reconsider their resolutions. Laws and decrees promulgated by the president must also be countersigned by the premier.

In the event of vacancies in both the presidency and the vice presidency, the premier serves as acting president of the republic for up to three months.

Although the premier is appointed without legislative approval, one-third of the legislators may initiate a no-confidence vote against the premier. If approved with simple majority, the premier must resign from office within ten days and at the same time may request that the president dissolve the Legislative Yuan. If the motion fails, another no-confidence motion against the same premier cannot be initiated for one year. This power has never been used. In practice, the president has enough legitimacy and executive authority to govern in the face of a legislature controlled by the opposition, and would likely respond to a vote of no-confidence by nominating another person with similar views.

== Executive and legislative powers ==
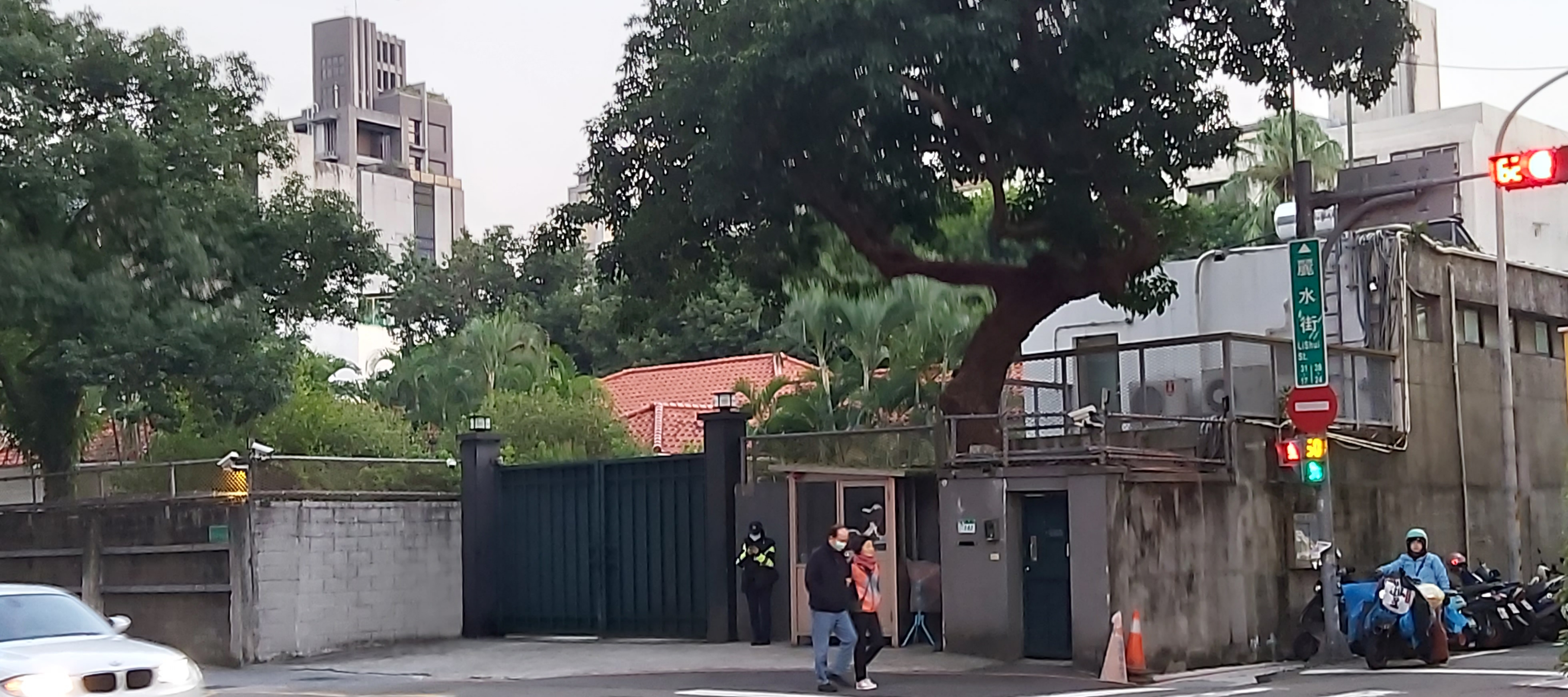
Official residence of Premier in Daan District, Taipei.

The Constitution of the Republic of China did not originally define strictly the relation between the premier and the president of the Republic and it was not clear whether the government would lean towards a presidential system or parliamentary system when divided. Power shifted to Premier Chiang Ching-kuo after President Chiang Kai-shek's death but shifted to the presidency again when Chiang Ching-kuo became president. After President Lee Teng-hui succeeded Chiang as president in 1988, the power struggle within the Kuomintang extended to the constitutional debate over the relationship between the president and the premier. The first three premiers under Lee, Yu Kuo-hwa, Lee Huan and Hau Pei-tsun, were mainlanders who had initially opposed Lee's ascension to power. The appointment of Lee and Hau were compromises by President Lee to placate the conservative mainlander faction in the party. The subsequent appointment of premier Lien Chan was taken as a sign of Lee's consolidation of power. Moreover, during this time, the power of the premier to approve the president's appointments and the power of the Legislative Council to confirm the president's choice of premier was removed (out of fears that the Democratic Progressive Party would one day gain control of the legislature), clearly establishing the president as the more powerful position of the two.

The relationship between the premier and the legislature again became a contentious issue after the 2000 presidential election, in which the DPP's Chen Shui-bian won the presidency, while the legislature remained under a KMT-led pan-Blue majority. Initially, President Chen Shui-bian appointed Tang Fei, a KMT member, as premier; however, Chen's subsequent appointments were from the DPP, establishing minority governments. However, the KMT and its coalition partners contended that Chen's actions were unconstitutional, and proposed naming their own choice of premier.

When Chen's successor Ma Ying-jeou and his KMT party lost the majority in the legislature, Ma reached out to the DPP, but the DPP declined to provide input; thus presidents subsequently appointed premiers largely from their own parties and the established constitutional convention is that the premier is responsible to the president and does not have any responsibility to the legislature other than to report on his activities. There are calls for a constitutional amendment to better define the relationship between the executive and legislative branches of government.

== See also ==
- President of the Republic of China
- Politics of Taiwan
- Elections in Taiwan
