= 2022 Taiwanese constitutional referendum =

Nationwide referendum on constitutional amendment proposal 1
- 26 November 2022
- Any citizen of the Republic of China who has attained the age of 18 years shall have the right of election, recall, initiative and referendum in accordance with law. Except as otherwise provided by this Constitution or by law, any citizen who has attained the age of 18 years shall have the right of being elected in accordance with law. The provisions of Articles 130 of the Constitution shall cease to apply.
- Voting system: Amendment is ratified if votes in favour exceed half of eligible voters (9,619,696).
- Outcome: Failed due to insufficient votes

Results
Choice	Votes	%
Yes	5,647,102	52.96%
No	5,016,427	47.04%
Valid votes	10,663,529	93.99%
Invalid or blank votes	682,403	6.01%
Total votes	11,345,932	100.00%
Eligible to vote/turnout	19,239,392	58.97%

A referendum on a constitutional amendment was held in Taiwan on 26 November 2022. Voters voted on adding Article 1–1 to the Additional Articles of the Constitution of the Republic of China. Had it passed, the voting age would have been lowered from 20 to 18 years. The amendment would also have lowered the minimum age of candidacy from 23 to 18 years once the relevant electoral laws had been amended accordingly.

It was the first constitutional referendum since the suspension of the National Assembly in 2005. The amendment was defeated after the number of votes in favour of the motion fell short of the threshold of half the eligible voters.

== Background ==
The Constitution of the Republic of China was passed on 25 December 1947 by the Nationalist government who controlled Mainland China when the country was in turmoil at the time. As relations between the ruling Kuomintang (KMT) and the Chinese Communist Party (CCP) became tense, the National Assembly invoked article 174 of the constitution and adopted the Temporary Provisions, but the KMT had been driven off the mainland in 1949 by the CCP. The KMT then relocated the central government to Taiwan, formerly a Qing province that the ROC obtained from the Japanese Empire in 1945. However, the democratization period saw the elimination of the Temporary Provisions under Lee Teng-hui in 1991 and introduced the Additional Articles of the Constitution of the Republic of China that saw the National Assembly's powers reduced and transferred to the Legislative Yuan before finally suspending itself on 7 June 2005.

This is the first time ratification of a constitutional amendment will be attempted via referendum without the consent of the National Assembly.

There were several previous efforts and discussions to lower the voting age and related minimum ages from 20 to 18. Proposals of such were defeated by the National Assembly in 1990s. In 2005, Youth Rights Alliance Taiwan became the first civic group to advocate lowering the voting age. Movement grew stronger in 2015 as the Constitutional Amendment Committee of the Legislative Yuan debated on the issue, but failed to advance as KMT's demand to include absentee voting in constitutional amendment did not gather support from the Democratic Progressive Party (DPP).

Successful incremental moves included a set of amendments to the Referendum Act passed in December 2017, one of which permitted eighteen-year-olds to vote in non-constitutional referendums. In August 2020, the Executive Yuan formally proposed that the age of majority be lowered from 20 to 18. Subsequently, the Legislative Yuan approved related amendments to the Civil Code of the Republic of China in December 2020.

== Parliamentary debate ==
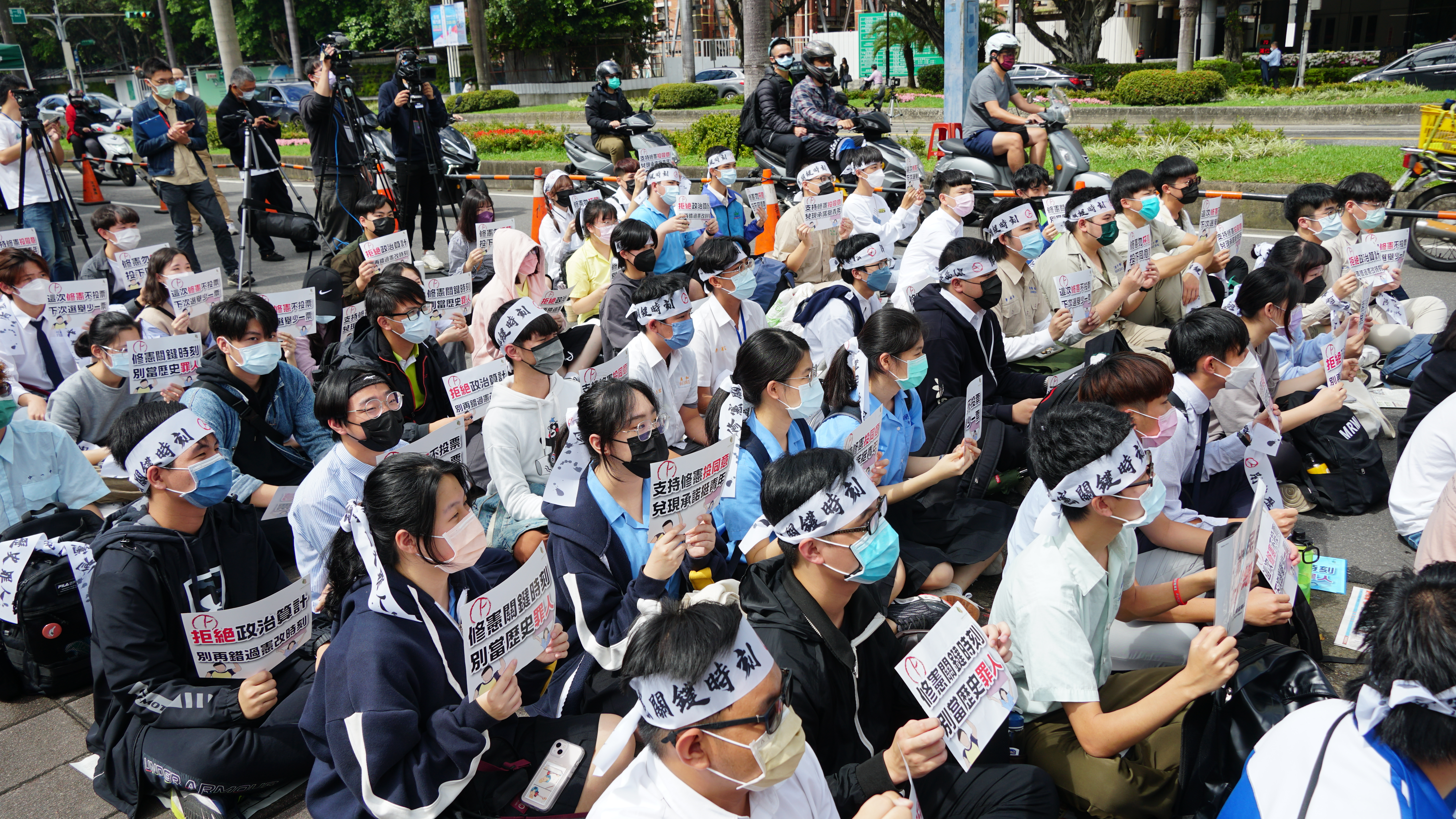
Rally outside Legislative Yuan in support of lowering voting age

Previous attempts to lower the voting age specifically included a bill proposed by the KMT legislative caucus in March 2020. In May 2020, Tsai Ing-wen confirmed the Constitutional Amendment Committee will be established in the new session of the Legislative Yuan to discuss relevant proposals. The committee was formally set up in October 2020.

On 18 January 2022, the Constitutional Amendment Committee reviewed and passed a bill jointly sponsored by the DPP, New Power Party, and Taiwan People's Party. The referendum was necessitated after the Legislative Yuan voted 109–0 on 25 March 2022 to lower the voting age and the age to stand for election to 18. Four legislators did not attend the vote, including three from the KMT. Eight youth rights groups and nongovernmental organizations formed a coalition to advocate for the bill's passage. Supporters of the bill had used the hashtag #votefor18 when discussing the bill online. On the day of the vote, a number of high school students gathered outside the Legislative Yuan, cheering when the bill passed.

== Amendment ==
Voters voted on adding Article 1–1 to the Additional Articles of the Constitution of the Republic of China, translated as:

Any citizen of the Republic of China who has attained the age of 18 years shall have the right of election, recall, initiative and referendum in accordance with law. Except as otherwise provided by this Constitution or by law, any citizen who has attained the age of 18 years shall have the right of being elected in accordance with law.
The provisions of Articles 130 of the Constitution shall cease to apply.

— Proposed Article 1-1 of the Additional Articles of the Constitution of the Republic of China

If passed, voting age would have been lowered from 20 to 18 years; the age for right to recall, initiative and participate in referendums would set to 18 years by the constitution; the age of candidacy will be lowered from 23 to 18 years (only to come into effect if the relevant electoral laws regulating the age of candidacy had been amended accordingly).

== Referendum threshold ==
The Central Election Commission announced on 15 April 2022 that the referendum would be held concurrently with local elections on 26 November.

Suffrage is a right guaranteed in the Constitution of the Republic of China to citizens above the age of 20, and the right to stand for election is guaranteed to citizens above the age of 23 (except in cases outlined in the Constitution and the Civil Servants Election and Recall Act).

Per the Constitution's Additional Articles, after a vote for a constitutional amendment has passed with at least a three-fourths supermajority of a three-fourths quorum in the Legislative Yuan, the amendment must be voted on via referendum within a three-month period six months after the public announcement. Half of all eligible voters (9,619,696) must vote for the referendum proposal for it to pass. Although the Referendum Act allows citizens older than 18 to vote on referendums, citizens younger than 20 cannot participate in the voting age referendum because the voting age for referendums regarding constitutional amendments is outlined in the Constitution.

== Results ==
With 5.6 million voting in support, 5 million in opposition, and six percent of voters casting invalid ballots, the referendum failed. In conjunction with 2022 local elections, it was thought that a desire among KMT supporters to contain the Democratic Progressive Party, along with a higher turnout among those supporters, contributed to the referendum's failure to pass.

2022 Constitutional Referendum Results
	Count	%	% electorate
Electorate	19,239,392	100.00	
Threshold	9,619,696	50.00	
Agree votes	5,647,102	52.96	29.35
Disagree votes	5,016,427	47.04	26.07
Valid votes	10,663,529	93.99	55.54
Invalid votes	682,403	6.02	3.55
Total votes	11,345,932	100.00	58.97
Outcome	Failed		
