= Elections in Taiwan =

Nationwide general and local elections are held every four years, typically in January and November. By-elections and referendums are held on occasion. Electoral systems include first-past-the-post, proportional representation, single non-transferable voting, and a parallel mixture of the above.

General elections are held to elect the president and vice president jointly, and the 113 members of the Legislative Yuan. Local elections are held to elect magistrates of counties, mayors of special municipalities, cities, townships and county-administered cities, chief administrators of indigenous districts and village chiefs. Legislative Yuan and local elections are regional; citizens vote based on their registered address.

Elections are supervised by the Central Election Commission (CEC), an independent agency under the central government, with the municipality, county and city election commissions under its jurisdiction. The minimum voting age is twenty years. Voters must satisfy a four-month residency requirement before being allowed to cast a ballot.

Taiwan was ranked second most electoral democracy in Asia according to V-Dem Democracy indices in 2023. Taiwan scored 0.831 on the V-Dem Democracy electoral democracy index in 2023.

== History ==
Elections were held for the first time in Taiwan by the Japanese colonial government on 22 November 1935, electing half of the city and township councilors. The other half were appointed by the prefectural governors. Only men aged 25 and above and who had paid a tax of five yen or more a year were allowed to vote, which was only 28,000 out of the 4 million population. The elections were held again in 1939, but the 1943 election was canceled due to the Second World War. After the surrender of Japan and the transfer of control over Taiwan to the Republic of China, elections were held at the local level as well as to elect representatives to the National Assembly and the Legislative Yuan. The ceding of Taiwan was formalized under the Treaty of Taipei in 1952.

The government of the Republic of China, led by the Kuomintang, retreated to Taiwan Island in 1949 after losing the Chinese Civil War with the Chinese Communist Party. At that time, the Temporary Provisions Effective During the Period of Communist Rebellion was enforced and largely restricted civil and political rights including voting rights of the Taiwanese people. In the eight elections starting from the 1948 Republic of China presidential election in Nanking (later known as Nanjing) to the 1990 Taiwan presidential election, the President was indirectly elected by the National Assembly first elected in 1947 and which had never been reelected in its entirety until the lifting of martial law. Similarly, the Legislative Yuan also had not been reelected as a whole since 1948 until the lifting of martial law. The provincial Governor and municipal Mayors were appointed by the central government. Direct elections were only held for local governments at the county level and for legislators at the provincial level. In addition, the Martial law in Taiwan from 1949 to 1987 also prohibited most forms of opposition and Republic of China was governed as a de facto one-party state under the Kuomintang although it maintained its status as a de jure parliamentary republic.

From the 1990s, a series of democratic reforms were implemented in Taiwan. Since the lifting of martial law in 1987, the ROC has had two major political parties, the Kuomintang and the Democratic Progressive Party. Since then, smaller parties have split from the two main parties and formed as new groups, largely within the Pan-Blue Coalition and Pan-Green Coalition. The Additional Articles of the Constitution were adopted to grant full civil and political rights to the Taiwanese people (officially the people of the Free area of the Republic of China). Under the Additional Articles, the President are to be elected by popular vote and all seats in the national parliament are to be reelected. Following the reforms, the first parliamentary elections on Taiwan were held in 1991 for the National Assembly and 1992 for the Legislative Yuan. The first election for provincial Governors and municipality Mayors was held in 1994. Until 1996, the President of the Republic of China was elected by the National Assembly. In 1996, the Republic of China electoral code was amended to allow for direct election of the President via plurality voting and Taiwan held the first direct election of the President and Vice President in 1996.

The provincial government was reconstructed as a subsidiary of the central government in 1998 and elections for governor and provincial legislators were terminated. The National Assembly ceased to be convened regularly in 2000 and was abolished in 2005. The number of members of the Legislative Yuan was reduced to 113 from 2008. Taiwan reformed 2008 the legislative election from the single non-transferable vote to parallel voting. In recent years, the electoral system has been further consolidated the various elections into two categories: national elections and local elections, each election category to be held on the same day.

- The national elections elect the President and Vice President as well as the 113 Legislators.
- The local elections elect 11,130 local officials who serve in self-government bodies.

Since 2004 there have been 20 referendums in Taiwan.

== Current election types ==
=== Presidential elections ===
Presidential elections are held to jointly elect the president and vice president by first-past-the-post.

=== Legislative Yuan elections ===
Legislative elections are held to elect the 113 members of the Legislative Yuan by parallel voting:

- 73 members by first-past-the-post in single-member constituencies
- 6 by single non-transferable voting in multi-member constituencies, exclusive for persons with indigenous status
- 34 by party-list proportional representation voting

=== Local elections ===
Nine types of local elections are held to elect:

- Mayors of special municipalities
- Magistrates of counties and mayors of cities
- Councillors in special municipality councils
- Councillors in county and city councils
- Mayors of townships and county-administered cities
- Representatives in township/city councils
- Chief administrators of mountain indigenous districts
- Representatives in mountain indigenous district councils
- Village chiefs

The local elections are also known as "nine-in-one elections" as the election date has been consolidated in recent years. A resident of a county or indigenous district is eligible for five types of votes, whereas a resident of a city or non-indigenous district of a special municipality is eligible for three. Magistrates, mayors, chief administrators, and village chiefs are elected by first-past-the-post. Councillors and council representatives are elected by single non-transferable voting in multi-member constituencies.

== Eligibility ==
In order to vote in Taiwan, one must be a national with household registration of the Republic of China who will be 20 years or older on the day before the election.

For presidential elections, the voter must have once lived in the Taiwan area for six consecutive months or longer. Residents of the area at the time of the election are automatically registered while those living abroad must apply.

For legislative and local elections, the voter must have been living in the associated electoral district for four consecutive months or longer at the time of the election. For legislative elections, the electoral district for indigenous and party-list votes is nationwide. Eligibility for the three types of votes is evaluated separately.

== Upcoming nationwide elections and referendums ==
For past elections, see respective articles.

- 2026 local elections
- 2026 referendum
- 2028 presidential election
- 2028 legislative election

== See also ==
- Referendums in Taiwan
- Central Election Commission (Taiwan)
- List of political parties in Taiwan
- Administrative divisions of Taiwan
- Politics of Taiwan
- History of Taiwan
- History of the Republic of China
- Electoral calendar
- Electoral system
- Voting rights of Taiwanese expatriates
