= 2026 Taiwanese referendum =

Nationwide referendum proposal 22
- 28 November 2026
- Do you agree that the government should adopt "nuclear power", which reinvigorates the economy, in order to abolish the energy policy of "Nuclear-Free Homeland"? (Note: Chinese: 你是否支持政府使用「核電」振興經濟，以廢除「非核家園」的能源政策？)
- Voting system: The initiative is ratified if votes in favor exceed a quarter of eligible voters and the number of votes not in favor.
Yes	%
No	%

A referendum is scheduled to be held in Taiwan on 28 November 2026 asking voters if the country should adopt nuclear power. The referendum will take place alongside local elections.

== Referendum proposals ==
In April 2026, Hung Mong-kai and six other Kuomintang members of the Legislative Yuan announced their caucus supported a referendum to legalize caning as punishment for major crimes including fraud, child abuse, and sexual assault. A legislative vote on the proposal was held the following month. The KMT also considered restoration of nuclear power and capital punishment as potential grounds for referendum. The Taiwan People's Party backed absentee voting for presidential and legislative elections, as well as national referendums, as referendum topics. The newly seated chair of the Central Election Commission, Michael You, urged caution in the referendum proposal and approval process. In June, the KMT turned its attention away from caning to focus on nuclear power and capital punishment, while the TPP put forward a proposed referendum on funding transportation subsidies through the collection of traffic fines and absentee voting. By July, the TPP drafted another referendum proposal on euthanasia. That same month, KMT and TPP used their joint legislative majority to bypass committee review and advance referendum proposals on nuclear power and the legalization of medical euthanasia directly to a second reading. The second reading on the caning proposal was passed only with KMT support. Due to the number of referendum proposals under consideration leading to a possible six-question referendum alongside local elections, the KMT supported listing multiple referendum questions on a single ballot. To this end, amendments to the Referendum Act provisions on balloting were proposed and advanced to a second legislative reading in late July. CEC chair You opposed multiple-question referendum ballots.

The Legislative Yuan voted to approve the referendum on caning, traffic fine usage, and nuclear power in August 2026, while the euthanasia proposal did not pass and the absentee voting proposal was not voted upon. On 16 August 2026, prior to the approval of any referendum question by the Central Election Commission, the National Human Rights Commission cited the International Covenant on Civil and Political Rights in opposition to the judicial caning proposal.

== Scheduling and pre-referendum debates ==
On 28 August 2026, the Central Election Commission approved the referendum question on nuclear power and rejected the questions about judicial caning and traffic fine revenue allocation. On 18 September, the CEC announced that a series of five debates on referendum-related topics would take place from 12 to 20 November. Prior to the debates, a group of environmental and legal organizations advocated voting against the referendum question. On the day of the first debate, the Central Election Commission announced that there were 20,007,484 eligible voters for the referendum.

During the first debate, KMT legislator Niu Hsu-ting cited energy security concerns in support of the referendum. DPP lawmaker Chen Pei-yu opined that objections to her party's nuclear-free policy could be resolved by amending legislation, and discussed nuclear safety protocols that needed to take place before nuclear power generation resumed. In the second debate, Chen Jong-shun, of the Chung-Hua Institution for Economic Research's Center for Green Economy, stated that nuclear power production was needed to keep pace with Taiwan's economy, as renewable energy capacities were not yet sufficiently developed to meet the demand. Vice Minister of Economic Affairs Lai Chien-hsin said that restating nuclear power generation relied on principles of legal and scientific review, not merely a political process, such as a referendum. During the third debate, Huang Shih-hsiu opined that the nuclear-free homeland policy had led the government to fall behind on its renewable energy goals, and focus on less stable sources of energy production, such as natural gas. Shen Pei-ling of the Taiwan Obasang Political Equality Party spoke in opposition, emphasizing that the referendum was being held prior to actionable plans for nuclear waste disposal and resumption of nuclear power. TPP lawmaker Hung Yu-hsiang supported the referendum during the fourth debate, stating that nuclear power would provide stable electricity for the semiconductor and artificial intelligence industries in Taiwan, both major components of the economy. Wang Shou-cheng of the Taiwan Geothermal Association and National Taiwan Ocean University, observed that the Maanshan Nuclear Power Plant was particularly near fault shear zones and stated that safety measures taken regarding old equipment would be costly and time-intensive.
