= Referendums in Taiwan =

How referendums are held in Taiwan

Referendums in Taiwan at both the national and local level are governed by the Referendum Act of Taiwan, which was enacted by the Legislative Yuan in December 2003. Citizens can propose laws via referendums at the national and local levels. The Referendum Act also allowed people to make changes or abolish laws by referendums.

The 7th amendment of the Additional Articles of the Constitution in June 2005 also moved the final ratification process for future constitutional amendment and national territory alternation into a form of referendum. These referendum has a higher bar of proposing and approval set directly by the Constitution outside of the Referendum Act.

== History ==
=== Legislative process ===
While the rights of initiatives and referendums are mentioned in the Three Principles of the People and Chapter 9, Article 136 of the Constitution of 1947, a law pertaining specifically to referendums was not enacted until 2003. The Referendum Act was promoted by Democratic Progressive Party (DPP) politicians such as Chai Trong-rong, Lin Yi-hsiung, Yeh Chu-lan, Lu Hsiu-yi, Lin Cho-shui, and the Chen Shui-bian-Annette Lu administration. While both citizens of Taiwan and the Legislative Yuan can initiate the referendum process, the Pan-Blue Coalition held a legislative majority at the time of the act's promulgation, and set an extremely high bar to prevent its application. The first referendum to be proposed by the legislature was the 2025 Taiwanese referendum backed by the Kuomintang and the Taiwan People's Party. The same parties used their joint legislative majority to propose another referendum the following year.

=== Defensive referendum ===
Article 17 of the Referendum Act states "When the country is under the threat of foreign force and the national sovereignty is likely to be changed, the President may, with the resolution of the meeting of the Executive Yuan, apply the matters regarding the national security to referendum." Such a referendum has been held in 2004.

=== 2017–2025 amendments to the Referendum Act ===
No national referendum question had reached the majority support quota until 2018, when seven questions were approved as part of a ten-question referendum. Three had been successful at the local level. New Power Party, Taiwan Solidarity Union, and some DPP members are major forces in the legislature calling for reform.

The Legislative Yuan revised several sections of the Referendum Act in December 2017. The first round proposal threshold for national and local referendums were cut from 0.1 to 0.01 percent of the electorate in the most recent presidential election, and the second tier proposal threshold for referendums was lowered from 5 to 1.5 percent of the electorate. Additionally, referendums will be declared passed if a majority of voters vote for propositions, and the number of agreeing votes reaches 25 percent of the electorate, instead of 50 percent.

Several amendments to the Referendum Act were proposed in June 2019, among them a requirement for voters to provide a photocopy of their National Identification Card when voting on referendums. An amendment to separate election years from referendum years was passed, and took effect in August 2021. The same amendment also limited referendum voting to every two years, and mandated a specific date for the vote, the fourth Saturday in August. In November 2025, the Referendum Act was amended, mandating referendum proposals be approved within three to six months and be held alongside national elections, if an election was scheduled during that time.

Article 25 of the Referendum Act was amended in 2018, permitting absentee voting for national referendums, once such procedures were enumerated in a separate law. The Central Election Commission proposed a bill on absentee voting in referendums in 2020, and it was approved by the Executive Yuan in September 2021.

== Constitutional referendums ==
The current Additional Articles of the Constitution designed two topics for a constitutional referendum in Articles 1, 4, and 12: Constitutional amendment and National territory alternation. The constitution has set a high bar in these referendums over Referendum Act.

The process for a constitutional amendment or national territory alternation has to be initiated by one-fourth (25%) of the members of the Legislative Yuan (the unicameral parliament of Taiwan), then voted in the Legislative Yuan with at least three-fourths (75%) members attended and by a three-fourths (75%) supermajority. A constitutional referendum will then be conducted if the amendment is proposed by the Legislative Yuan, the quorum to pass the constitutional referendum is one-half (50%) of all eligible voters have voted yes.

The first constitutional referendum scheduled since the 2005 amendments to the Additional Articles was the 2022 Taiwanese voting age referendum.

== National referendums ==
=== Referendums ===
There have been twenty-one national referendums in Taiwan. During the first six, two referendum questions were asked in each of three national elections. In each of these six national referendums, "Yes" votes won a majority over "No" votes. However, the referendum results were invalidated each time due to low turnout rate. According to the Referendum Law, 50% turnout of qualified voters is required for the referendum to be valid. The threshold was not reached in any of the first six national referendums, as the Kuomintang asked its supporters to boycott each referendum. Therefore, the removal of the turnout restriction in the referendum law has been proposed. Several provisions regarding turnout were amended by the Legislative Yuan in December 2017.

Following amendments to the Referendum Act, ten questions were asked during the 2018 Taiwanese referendum, held alongside local elections. The four-question 2021 Taiwanese referendum was scheduled for August and postponed to December due to the COVID-19 pandemic. The 2025 Taiwanese referendum was the first to be held on the date prescribed by the 2019 amendments to the Referendum Act.

National referendum	Date	Proposition No.	Results	Note
2004 Taiwanese cross-strait relations referendum	March 20, 2004	1, 2	2 rejected	Held jointly with 2004 Taiwanese presidential election
2008 Taiwanese transitional justice referendum	January 12, 2008	3, 4	2 rejected	Held jointly with 2008 Taiwanese legislative election
2008 Taiwanese United Nations membership referendum	March 22, 2008	5, 6	2 rejected	Held jointly with 2008 Taiwanese presidential election
2018 Taiwanese referendum	November 24, 2018	7—16	7 approved, 3 rejected	Held jointly with 2018 Taiwanese local elections
2021 Taiwanese referendum	December 18, 2021	17—20	4 rejected	Originally scheduled for August 28, 2021; postponed due to the COVID-19 pandemic
2022 Taiwanese constitutional referendum	November 26, 2022	Constitutional-1	rejected	Held jointly with 2022 Taiwanese local elections
2025 Taiwanese referendum	August 23, 2025	21	rejected	First referendum to be held after the 2019 Referendum Act amendments mandating specific dates for referendums entered into force
2026 Taiwanese referendum	November 28, 2026	22		Held jointly with 2026 Taiwanese local elections

=== Referendum proposals ===
A national referendum on the state of Kuomintang party assets was proposed in 2006. The Act Governing the Handling of Ill-gotten Properties by Political Parties and Their Affiliate Organizations was promulgated by the Legislative Yuan in July 2016 to handle the issue instead.

In 2010, the Referendum Review Committee, then controlled by the Pan-Blue Coalition, rejected several referendum proposals against the Economic Cooperation Framework Agreement, signed in 2010. despite the collection of nearly 200,000 signatures supporting a referendum on cross-strait economic pacts. Public opinion surveys show a majority of respondents opposed the signing of the ECFA with China and many experts, politicians, and protesters see a referendum for the ECFA as essential.

In 2016, Kuomintang vice chairman Hau Lung-pin proposed that the fate of a food import ban in place against some prefectures of Japan since the 2011 Fukushima Daiichi nuclear disaster be decided via referendum. The Kuomintang legislative caucus moved to reduce turnout restrictions so the food import ban could be considered via referendum, but the proposal did not pass at the time. A majority of people voted for question nine of the 2018 national referendum, expressing a desire for the import ban to remain in place. In February 2022, the Tsai Ing-wen presidential administration lifted the import ban for most foodstuffs produced in the region, as long as proper documentation on the origins of the food and results of radiation inspections were provided. Foods from the region that were still banned from the Japanese market at the time of Taiwan's announcement, such as mushrooms, the meat of wild animals, and koshiabura, remained banned in Taiwan.

== Local referendums ==
From 1990 to 2003, sixteen local referendums were called. Since the Referendum Act passed, six local referendums have been held as of 2021. The first one was held in Kaohsiung in 2008 for reducing the size of classes in elementary school and high school. It was invalid due to its low turnout rate. Four other local referendums attempted to legalize casinos and were valid due via special law: the ones held in Penghu in 2009 and 2016 failed while the one held in Lienchiang in 2012 succeeded. A referendum on the establishment of casinos in Kinmen held in 2017 was defeated by low turnout and high opposition. However, as in Mainland China, the largest potential tourist source, has explicitly expressed the opposition of its nationals to engage gambling, no legal casino has yet been established in Taiwan. Residents of Hsinchu passed a referendum about wastewater, held on the same day as the 2021 national referendum.

Division	Date	Proposition No.	Results	Note
Kaohsiung City	November 15, 2008	1	Rejected	
Penghu County	September 26, 2009	1	Rejected	Proposition to legalize casinos
Lienchiang County	July 7, 2012	1	Approved	Proposition to legalize casinos
Penghu County	October 15, 2016	2	Rejected	Proposition to legalize casinos
Kinmen County	October 28, 2017	1	Rejected	Proposition to legalize casinos
Hsinchu City	December 18, 2021	1	Approved	Held jointly with 2021 Taiwanese referendum

== See also ==
- Constitution of the Republic of China
- Additional Articles of the Constitution of the Republic of China
- Elections in Taiwan
