= 2021 Taiwanese referendum =

Nationwide referendum proposals 17–20
- 18 December 2021
- Voting system: An initiative is ratified if votes in favour exceed a quarter of eligible voters (4,956,367) and the number of votes not in favour.
- Outcome: All failed

Restarting nuclear power plant construction
Yes	47.16%
No	52.84%

Banning ractopamine-contained pork imports
Yes	48.79%
No	51.21%

Holding referendums alongside elections
Yes	48.96%
No	51.04%

Keeping natural gas terminal out of algal reefs
Yes	48.37%
No	51.63%

A four-question referendum was held in Taiwan on 18 December 2021. The vote was originally scheduled to take place on 28 August 2021, but was postponed to December due to the COVID-19 pandemic. All four questions were popular initiatives. According the Referendum Act as amended in 2019, referendums can be held once every two years on the fourth Saturday of August and questions must gather a number of signatures equivalent to 1.5% of eligible voters (280,000) in order to qualify.

All four proposals were rejected.

In Hsinchu, a local referendum on the issue of wastewater management was passed. Subsequently, on 15 April 2022, the Hsinchu City Council passed the Hsinchu City Ordinance on Wastewater Discharge.

== Scheduling ==
Following the amendments to the Referendum Act passed in June 2019, some of which set aside a designated day for referendums, specifying that referendums can be held once every two years on the fourth Saturday of August, referendums were scheduled for 28 August 2021. The threshold to initiate referendum questions had previously been lowered to valid signatures of 1.5 percent of eligible voters in a set of amendments passed in June 2017. Due to the COVID-19 pandemic in Taiwan, the Central Election Commission announced on 2 July 2021 that the referendum would be postponed until 18 December 2021.

In the 2021 Taiwanese referendum, there were four questions, numbered 17 to 20 to account for numbered questions in previous referendums. The first question to have passed the qualification threshold, in January 2021, considered the activation of the Lungmen Nuclear Power Plant. The three other questions on the referendum were certified by the Central Election Commission in May 2021. The largest opposition party, Kuomintang, offered support for two of the referendum questions, actively gathering signatures regarding ractopamine in imported pork, and future referendum scheduling.

== Questions ==
The questions range from No.17–20, including the issues of nuclear plant activation, a ban on ractopamine-containing pork imports, an algae reef and LNG receiving station, and referendums being held at the same time as nationwide elections.

According to Article 29 of the Referendum Act, a referendum is passed if the valid ballots in favor exceed the ballots against, and the valid ballots in favor exceeds 25% of the eligible electorate. For the 2021 referendum, the 25% threshold is equivalent to 4,956,367 votes.

=== Nuclear plant ===
The No. 17 question, and the first to have passed the threshold, considered the activation of the Lungmen Nuclear Power Plant, the fourth nuclear power plant in Taiwan, which is located in New Taipei City. The plant was under construction until 2014, when it was shut down by the ruling Kuomintang due to concerns about the safety of nuclear power in the country. The policy has been maintained by the ruling Democratic Progressive Party as it planned to phase out all nuclear energy by 2025. The policy is heavily criticized by proponents of nuclear power, which lead to the inclusion of a question on the abandonment of the nuclear power termination plan in the 2018 referendum, in which results favoured the continued operation of nuclear plants in the country.

The ballot read: "Do you agree the activation of Taiwan's mothballed Fourth Nuclear Power Plant?".

=== Ban on ractopamine-containing pork imports ===
The No. 18 question on the referendum has considered attempts to impose restrictions on the import of ractopamine-containing pork. Critics argued that ractopamine is an additive illegal in 160 countries due to food safety concerns and that its import could damage local producers. The opposition of the issue worries that the ban on the imports of ractopamine porks could potentially damage the international relationships and trade agreements of Taiwan, specifically the application of joining the CPTPP as well as Taiwan–United States relationship.

The ballot read: "Do you agree that government should put a ban of the importation of pork, internal organs and pork products containing ractopamine (β-adrenergic receptor agonists)?"

=== Referendum dates ===
The No. 19 question asked whether referendums should be held alongside general elections if a referendum proposal is confirmed less than six months before a general election. The question was proposed by the Kuomintang, arguing that holding referendums alongside general elections would attract higher vote turnouts. The Democratic Progressive Party cited logistical issues during the ten-question 2018 referendum, held concurrently with local elections, in opposition to this proposal.

The ballot read: "Do you agree within six months from the date the referendum be announced establishment, if there is a national election take place during the period, and in accordance with the provisions of the Referendum Act, that the referendum shall be held in conjunction with the national election?"

=== Algae reef protection ===
The No. 20 question referred to the construction of the Guantang LNG Terminal in Taoyuan's Datan Algal Reef. It is argued as necessary by the government as part of its fossil fuel phase-out plan but heavily criticized by environmental activists due to potential damage to the reef and its eco-system.

The ballot read: "Do you agree to relocate the construction site of CPC Third LNG Receiving Terminal away from the coastal and sea areas of Taoyuan's Datan Algae Reef? (The coastal area from the estuary of Guanyin River in the north to the estuary of Xinwu River in the south, and the sea area stretching out five kilometers parallelly alongside the lowest tide line of the aforementioned coast.)"

== Campaign ==
- ✔ indicates that the political party campaigned in favour of the question.
- ✖ indicates that the political party campaigned against the question.
- ➖ indicates that the political party maintained neutral or did not campaign for the related question.

Political parties' stances on every referendum questions
Political Parties	Question			
Political Parties	17	18	19	20
Democratic Progressive Party	✖	✖	✖	✖
Kuomintang	✔	✔	✔	✔
Taiwan People's Party	➖	✔	➖	✔
New Power Party	✖	✔	✔	✔
People First Party	➖	✔	➖	➖
Taiwan Statebuilding Party	✖	✖	✖	✖
Green Party Taiwan	✖	✖	✔	✖
New Party	✔	✔	✔	✔

== Results ==
All four proposals were rejected. Turnout was just over 41%, with valid ballots in favor on each question numbering between 19% and 20% of the total registered voters, short of the required 25% for a valid result.

Question	For		Against		Invalid/ blank	Total	Registered voters	Turnout	Outcome
Question	Votes	%	Votes	%	Invalid/ blank	Total	Registered voters	Turnout	Outcome
17. Restarting construction on the 4th nuclear power plant	3,804,755	47.16	4,262,451	52.84	78,494	8,145,700	19,825,468	41.09	Rejected
18. Banning pork imports containing ractopamine	3,936,554	48.79	4,131,203	51.21	78,108	8,145,865	19,825,468	41.09	Rejected
19. Holding referendums alongside nation-wide elections	3,951,882	48.96	4,120,038	51.04	73,273	8,145,193	19,825,468	41.08	Rejected
20. Keeping the third liquid natural gas terminal in Taoyuan out of algal reefs	3,901,171	48.37	4,163,464	51.63	80,819	8,145,454	19,825,468	41.09	Rejected
Source: CEC, Central News Agency

== Reactions ==
An article from The Wall Street Journal says that the result is welcoming to the Biden administration, which has pursued closer ties to Taiwan, saying that the vote on the pork imports could have complicated the Taiwanese relationship with Washington.

Another article from NHK reports that the election was originally positioned by the opposing Kuomintang party as a non-confidence vote against the ruling government. Much to the party's dismay, the results turned out to be a vote of confidence.

Foxconn CEO Terry Gou warned that "In the next year (2022), there must be power outages/electricity crisis in Taiwan," since the proposals about the activation of Fourth Nuclear Power Plant has been rejected by referendum. Nuclear advocate Huang Shih-hsiu said that he regretted the results, and accused the Democratic Progressive Party (DPP) of taking advantage of its administrative resources to manipulate the vote.
