= Additional Articles of the Constitution of the Republic of China =

Constitutional revisions and amendments

Overview
- Original title: 中華民國憲法增修條文
- Jurisdiction: Free area of the Republic of China
- Ratified: 22 April 1991; 35 years ago
- Date effective: 1 May 1991; 35 years ago
- System: Unitary semi-presidential republic

Government structure
- Branches: Five (Executive, Legislative, Judicial, Examination, Control)
- Head of state: President
- Chambers: Unicameral (Legislative Yuan)
- Executive: Executive Yuan led by the Premier
- Judiciary: Judicial Yuan
- Federalism: Unitary
- Electoral college: No

History
- First legislature: January 1, 1992 (NA); February 1, 1993 (LY)
- First executive: May 20, 1996 (President)
- Amendments: 7
- Last amended: June 10, 2005
- Commissioned by: National Assembly
- Signatories: 457 of the 583 remaining delegates, in Taipei (most delegates elected in 1947, with some elected in 1969 and 1986)
- Supersedes: Temporary Provisions against the Communist Rebellion and most articles of the original Constitution of the Republic of China

Additional Articles of the Constitution of the Republic of China
- Traditional Chinese: 中華民國憲法 增修條文
- Simplified Chinese: 中华民国宪法 增修条文
Transcriptions
Standard Mandarin
- Hanyu Pinyin: Zhōnghuá Mínguó Xiànfǎ Zēngxiū Tiáowén
- Bopomofo: ㄓㄨㄥ ㄏㄨㄚˊ ㄇㄧㄣˊ ㄍㄨㄛˊ ㄒㄧㄢˋ ㄈㄚˋ ㄗㄥ ㄒㄧㄡ ㄊㄧㄠˊ ㄨㄣˊ
- Gwoyeu Romatzyh: Jonghwa Min'gwo Shiannfaa Tzengshiou Tyauwen
- Wade–Giles: Chung¹-hua² Min²-kuo² Hsien⁴-fa³ Tseng¹-hsiu¹ T'iao²-wen²
- Tongyong Pinyin: Jhonghuá Mínguó Siànfǎ Zengsiou Tiáowún
- MPS2: Jūnghuá Mínguó Shiànfǎ Tzēngshiōu Tiáuwén
Hakka
- Romanization: Chûng-fà Mìn-koet Hien-fap Chen-siû Thiàu-vùn
Southern Min
- Hokkien POJ: Tiong-hôa Bîn-kok Hiàn-hoat Cheng-siu Tiâu-bûn
- Tâi-lô: Tiong-hûa Bîn-kok Hiàn-huat Tsing-siu Tiâu-bûn

The Additional Articles of the Constitution of the Republic of China are the revisions and amendments to the original constitution of the Republic of China to "meet the requisites of the nation prior to national unification", taking into account the democratic reforms and current political status of Taiwan. The Additional Articles are usually attached after the original constitution as a separate document. It also has its own preamble and article ordering different from the original constitution.

The Additional Articles has been part of the fundamental law of the present government of the Republic of China on Taiwan since 1991, and were last amended in 2005.

== Main provisions ==
The current Additional Articles of the Constitution entail 12 articles:

Article 1
Referendum on amendment to the Constitution and alteration of the national territory.
Article 2
President and the vice president.
Article 3
Premier and the Executive Yuan.
Article 4
Legislative Yuan.
Article 5
Judicial Yuan.
Article 6
Examination Yuan.
Article 7
Control Yuan.
Article 8
Remuneration and pay of the members of the Legislative Yuan.
Article 9
Local governments.
Article 10
Fundamental national policy.
Article 11
Cross-Strait relations (rights and obligations between people of the free area and mainland China).
Article 12
Procedure for amending the Constitution.

=== Free area ===
The territory controlled by the Government of the Republic of China changed significantly after the Chinese Civil War, and the Republic of China could not hold elections in territories it did not control. Thus, the Additional Articles of the Constitution defines the Free Area (Chinese: 自由地區; pinyin: Zìyóu Dìqū; Pe̍h-ōe-jī: Chū-iû Tē-khu; Pha̍k-fa-sṳ: Chhṳ-yù Thi-khî) to be the territory and the people under the government's effective jurisdiction. Whilst the preamble of the amendments still continues the One China stance of the original constitution, and all residents of China are nominally citizens of the Republic, only the citizens who have the household registration in Taiwan may exercise the full civil and political rights, including right of abode and suffrage.

=== Direct presidential election ===
The Additional Articles requires direct election of the President by the citizens of the free area. The first direct presidential election was held in 1996. Under the original constitution, the President was elected indirectly by the National Assembly.

=== Government reform and reorganization ===
The Additional Articles of the Constitution reformed the government of the Republic of China from a parliamentary system to a semi-presidential system. The National Assembly is de facto abolished, and its functions are exercised directly by the citizens of the Free area. The five-power governmental structure is retained, though it functions closer to the traditional Western trias politica in practice.

=== Constitutional referendum ===
A 2005 amendment regarding on referendum stated that a constitutional amendment or an alteration of the national territory has to be ratified by more than half (50%) of voters of the Free Area in a referendum after passed in the Legislative Yuan with a three-quarters majority. Before that, constitutional amendments and national territory alterations were ratified by the National Assembly.

== Comparison of the governmental structure ==
Most of the amendments brought by the Additional Articles focuses on the mechanism of separation of powers among central governmental organs. The Additional Articles changed the form of government from parliamentary system to semi-presidential system, enhance the implementation of direct democracy and direct election, reduce the chambers of parliament, and simplify the hierarchy of local governments.

Governmental structure	Additional Articles (2005)	Original Constitution (1947)
Form of government	Semi-presidential republic	Parliamentary republic
Head of state	The president is elected directly by the citizens of the free area (Taiwan) to a four-year term, and may be re-elected once.	The president is elected indirectly by the National Assembly to a six-year term, and may be re-elected once.
Head of government	The premier is appointed by the president. The Legislative Yuan may vote on a motion of no confidence.	The premier is nominated and appointed by the president, with the consent of the Legislative Yuan.
Parliament	Unicameralism: Legislative Yuan: Members of the Legislative Yuan are elected directly by the citizens of the free area (Taiwan) to a four-year term.	Tricameralism: National Assembly, Legislative Yuan and Control Yuan: Delegates of the National Assembly are elected directly by the citizens to a six-year term.; Members of the Legislative Yuan are elected directly by the citizens to a three-year term.; Members of the Control Yuan are elected indirectly by provincial legislators to a six-year term.
Judiciary	The justices are nominated and appointed by the president with the consent of the Legislative Yuan to an eight-year term.	The justices are nominated and appointed by the president with the consent of the Control Yuan to a nine-year term.
Local government	The provinces are streamlined: counties and cities under provinces are subordinated directly to the central government.	A two-level system is in place: the provincial-level and the county-level.

== History of amendments ==
The Additional Articles of the Constitution have been amended seven times since the 1990s.

Amendment	Process		Note
1st	Apr 22, 1991	Ratified by 1st National Assembly	Delegates elected in 1947, 1969, and 1986. In the 583 delegates, 470 attended, 457 agreed.
1st	May 1, 1991	Promulgated by 8th President Lee Teng-hui	Additional Articles established
2nd	May 27, 1992	Ratified by 2nd National Assembly	Delegates elected in 1986 and 1991. In the 403 delegates, 285 attended, 277 agreed.
2nd	May 28, 1992	Promulgated by 8th President Lee Teng-hui	
3rd	Jul 28, 1994	Ratified by 2nd National Assembly	Delegates elected in 1991. In the 321 delegates, 220 attended, 215 agreed.
3rd	Aug 1, 1994	Promulgated by 8th President Lee Teng-hui	
4th	Jul 18, 1997	Ratified by 3rd National Assembly	Delegates elected in 1996. In the 333 delegates, 269 attended, 261 agreed.
4th	Jul 21, 1997	Promulgated by 9th President Lee Teng-hui	
5th	Sep 3, 1999	Ratified by 3rd National Assembly	Delegates elected in 1996. In the 315 delegates, 214 attended, 211 agreed.
5th	Sep 15, 1999	Promulgated by 9th President Lee Teng-hui	
5th	Mar 24, 2000	Voided by Justices of the Judicial Yuan	Constitutional Interpretation No. 499
6th	Apr 24, 2000	Ratified by 3rd National Assembly	Delegates elected in 1996. In the 314 delegates, 287 attended, 285 agreed.
6th	Apr 25, 2000	Promulgated by 9th President Lee Teng-hui	
7th (in effect)	Aug 23, 2004	Proposed by 5th Legislative Yuan	Members elected in 2001. In the 225 members, 198 attended, 198 agreed.
7th (in effect)	Jun 7, 2005	Ratified by the National Assembly	Delegates elected in 2005. In the 300 delegates, 298 attended, 249 agreed.
7th (in effect)	Jun 10, 2005	Promulgated by 11th President Chen Shui-bian	Currently in force
—— (failed)	Mar 25, 2022	Proposed by 10th Legislative Yuan	Members elected in 2020. In the 113 members, 109 attended, 109 agreed.
—— (failed)	Nov 26, 2022	Ratification failed in national referendum	Out of 19,239,392 eligible voters, only 5,647,102 agreed. See 2022 Taiwanese constitutional referendum

== See also ==
- Constitution of the Republic of China
- Temporary Provisions against the Communist Rebellion
- Politics of the Republic of China
- History of Taiwan since 1945
