= Constitution of the Republic of China =

Supreme law of Mainland China from 1947 to 1949 and Taiwan since 1949

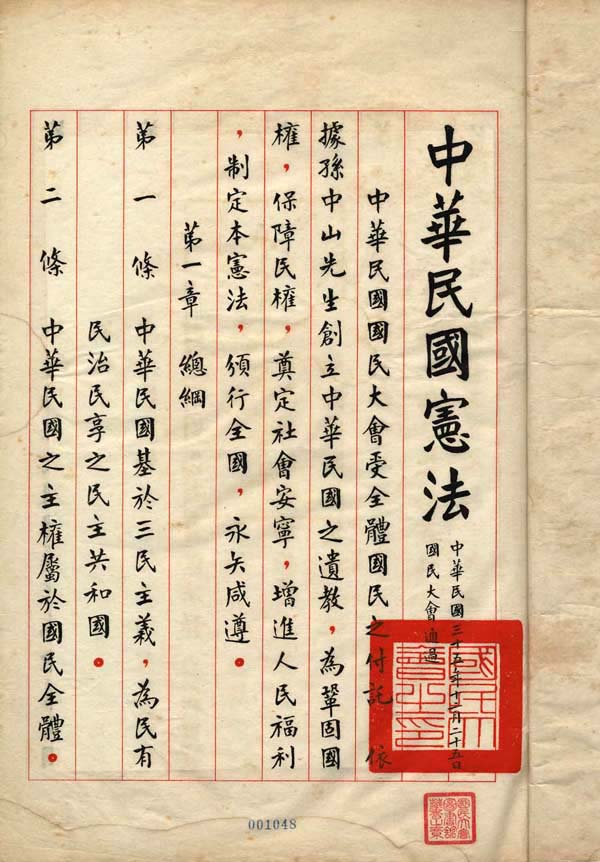
- First page of the original copy of the Constitution

Overview
- Original title: 中華民國憲法
- Jurisdiction: Republic of China; Mainland China (1947–1949); Taiwan Area
- Ratified: 25 December 1946; 79 years ago
- Date effective: 25 December 1947; 78 years ago
- System: Unitary parliamentary constitutional republic

Government structure
- Branches: Five (Executive, Legislative, Judicial, Examination, Control)
- Head of state: President
- Chambers: Tricameral (National Assembly, Legislative Yuan, Control Yuan)
- Executive: Premier led Executive Yuan
- Judiciary: Judicial Yuan
- Federalism: Unitary
- Electoral college: Yes (National Assembly)

History
- First legislature: 29 March 1948 (NA); 8 May 1948 (LY); 5 June 1948 (CY)
- First executive: 20 May 1948 (President); 24 May 1948 (Premier)
- First court: 2 July 1948
- Repealed: 1 October 1949; 77 years ago (Mainland China)
- Amendments: see Additional Articles of the Constitution of the Republic of China
- Location: Academia Historica, Zhongzheng, Taipei
- Commissioned by: National Constituent Assembly
- Authors: Carsun Chang and the members of the National Constituent Assembly
- Signatories: 1,701 of 2,050 delegates, in Nanjing
- Supersedes: Provisional Constitution of the Republic of China

Constitution of the Republic of China
- Traditional Chinese: 中華民國憲法
- Simplified Chinese: 中华民国宪法
Transcriptions
Standard Mandarin
- Hanyu Pinyin: Zhōnghuá Mínguó Xiànfǎ
- Bopomofo: ㄓㄨㄥ ㄏㄨㄚˊ ㄇㄧㄣˊ ㄍㄨㄛˊ ㄒㄧㄢˋ ㄈㄚˇ
- Gwoyeu Romatzyh: Jonghwa Min'gwo Shiannfaa
- Wade–Giles: Chung¹-hua² Min²-kuo² Hsien⁴-fa³
- Tongyong Pinyin: Jhonghuá Mínguó Siànfǎ
- MPS2: Jūnghuá Mínguó Shiànfǎ
Hakka
- Romanization: Chûng-fà Mìn-koet Hien-fap
Southern Min
- Hokkien POJ: Tiong-hôa Bîn-kok Hiàn-hoat
- Tâi-lô: Tiong-huâ Bîn-kok Hiàn-huat

The Constitution of the Republic of China is the fifth and current constitution of the Republic of China (ROC), ratified by the Kuomintang during the Constituent National Assembly session on 25 December 1946, in Nanking, and adopted on 25 December 1947. The constitution, along with its Additional Articles, remains effective in ROC-controlled territories and is no longer valid in mainland China since 1949.

Intended for the entire territory of the Republic of China as it was then constituted, it was never extensively nor effectively implemented due to the outbreak of the Chinese Civil War in mainland China at the time of the constitution's promulgation. The newly elected National Assembly soon ratified the Temporary Provisions against the Communist Rebellion on May 10, 1948. The Temporary Provisions symbolises the country's entering into the state of emergency and granted the Kuomintang-led government of the Republic of China extra-constitutional powers.

Following the ROC government's retreat to Taiwan on 7 December 1949, the Temporary Provisions together with martial law made the country an authoritarian one-party state despite the constitution. Democratization began in the 1980s. Martial law was lifted in 1987, and in 1991 the Temporary Provisions were repealed. The Additional Articles of the Constitution was passed to reflect the government's actual jurisdiction and realization of cross-Strait relations. The Additional Articles also significantly changed the structure of the government to a semi-presidential system with a unicameral parliament, which formed the basis of a multi-party democracy in Taiwan.

During the 1990s and early 2000s, the Constitution's origins in mainland China led to supporters of Taiwan independence to push for a new Taiwanese constitution. However, attempts by the Democratic Progressive Party administration to create a new constitution during the second term of DPP President Chen Shui-bian failed, because the then opposition Kuomintang controlled the Legislative Yuan. It was only agreed to reform the Constitution of the Republic of China, not to create a new one. It was last amended in 2005, with the consent of both the KMT and the DPP. The most recent revision to the constitution took place in 2004.

== History ==
Implementation of the Constitution of the Republic of China
Date	Other basic law	Government location	Timespan
25 December 1947 – 10 May 1948	—N/a	Nanking	4 months
10 May 1948 – 7 December 1949	Temporary Provisions against the Communist Rebellion	Nanking, Kwangchow (Canton), Chungking, Chengtu	1 year, 6 months
7 December 1949 – 30 April 1991	Temporary Provisions against the Communist Rebellion	Taipei	41 years, 4 months
1 May 1991 – present	Additional Articles of the Constitution	Taipei	35 years, 6 months

=== Origins ===
Dynastic China adopted a constitutional system oscillating between a feudal distribution of power and a centralistic autocracy. The idea of a constitutional monarchy, and a written constitution, became influential towards the end of the 19th century, inspired immediately in large parts by the precedent of the Meiji Constitution in Japan. The first attempt towards constitutionalism in China was during the Hundred Days' Reform that took place in 1898 by the young Guangxu Emperor and his reform-minded supporters, but a coup by conservative monarchists loyal to Empress Dowager Cixi ended this effort. The same faction, however, eventually adopted a policy of transitioning towards constitutionalism. However, the first constitutional document was only published in 1908, and the first constitutional document with legal force (the "Nineteen Covenants") was not implemented until 1911, after the eruption of the 1911 Revolution, which led to the end of the Qing dynasty the next year.

=== Colonial history ===
As a result of the First Sino-Japanese War, the Treaty of Shimonoseki granted Japan full sovereignty of Taiwan. Chinese cession of the Taiwanese Prefecture would facilitate the island's introduction to constitutional regimes: Japan had promulgated the Meiji Constitution six years prior. Thereafter, Japanese colonization stoked fierce debates surrounding the applicability of the Meiji Constitution towards colonial governments. Although the Meiji oligarchy declared that their constitution would not be applied to colonial possessions, Taiwanese people asserted that their naturalization as Japanese citizens guaranteed rights enumerated in the Meiji Constitution. These legal debates culminated in granting Taiwan special legal status—Taiwan nominally became governed by constitutional rule. However, constitutional rights were continuously violated by the Japanese military and state police. Representative institutions were not constitutionally installed. Likewise, Emperor Meiji granted the majority of executive and legislative powers to the Governor-General of Taiwan, an appointed military leader.

The 1920s saw the rise of indigenous political movements as Taiwanese activists sought local autonomy and greater political freedoms. From 1921 to 1934, political activists attempted to petition the Imperial Japanese government to establish Taiwanese parliamentary assembly, which was met with little success. Conversely, the formation of the Taiwan Local Autonomy Alliance in 1930 eventually contributed the limited city and township council elections in 1935. Caving to these political movements, the Japanese colonial government established councils to integrate public opinion with the state. Half of the council members were to be directly elected by voters while the remaining half of council members were to be appointed by the government. November 22, 1935, marked the landmark day where Taiwan's autonomous regional bodies held elections. Only adult males of higher socio-economic status were eligible to participate.

The Meiji Constitution would not be Taiwan's last constitutional imposition: Taiwan would face another constitutional crisis when China's KMT government fled to Taiwan during the Chinese Civil War. According to Taiwanese legal scholar Yeh Jiunn-rong, these constitutions would impart a lasting legacy on Taiwan's constitutionalism: they inspired constitutional indigenization with their disparate frameworks, serving as a foundation for Taiwan's eventual constitutional identity. Even today, remnants of Japanese colonialism exist within Taiwan's political systems. Up until 2005, Taiwan retained its single non-transferable voting (SNTV) system, a testament to the Meiji Constitution. Originating in Japan, the SNTV system grants voters one vote in multi-member districts. Unlike single transferable voting (STV), votes are non-transferable. Thus, surplus votes from one candidate cannot be transferred to other candidates. This electoral system lasted in Japan until 1994, yet persists in a limited form in Taiwan.

=== Early attempts of Chinese constitution ===
The Provisional Constitution of the Republic of China was drawn up in March 1912 and formed the basic government document of the Republic of China until 1928. It provided a Western-style parliamentary system headed by a weak president. However, the system was quickly usurped when Song Jiaoren was assassinated by the orders of President Yuan Shikai. Song was the leader of the KMT who was to become prime minister following the party's victory in the 1912 elections. Yuan regularly flouted the elected assembly and assumed dictatorial powers. Upon his death in 1916, China disintegrated into warlordism and the Beiyang Government operating under the Constitution remained in the hands of various military leaders.

The Kuomintang under Chiang Kai-shek established control over much of China by 1928. The Nationalist Government promulgated the Provisional Constitution of the Political Tutelage Period on 5 May 1931. Under this document, the government operated under a one-party system with supreme power held by the National Congress of the Kuomintang and effective power held by the Central Executive Committee of the Kuomintang. In Leninist fashion, it permitted a system of dual party-state committees to form the basis of government. The KMT intended this Constitution to remain in effect until the country had been pacified and the people sufficiently "educated" to participate in democratic government.

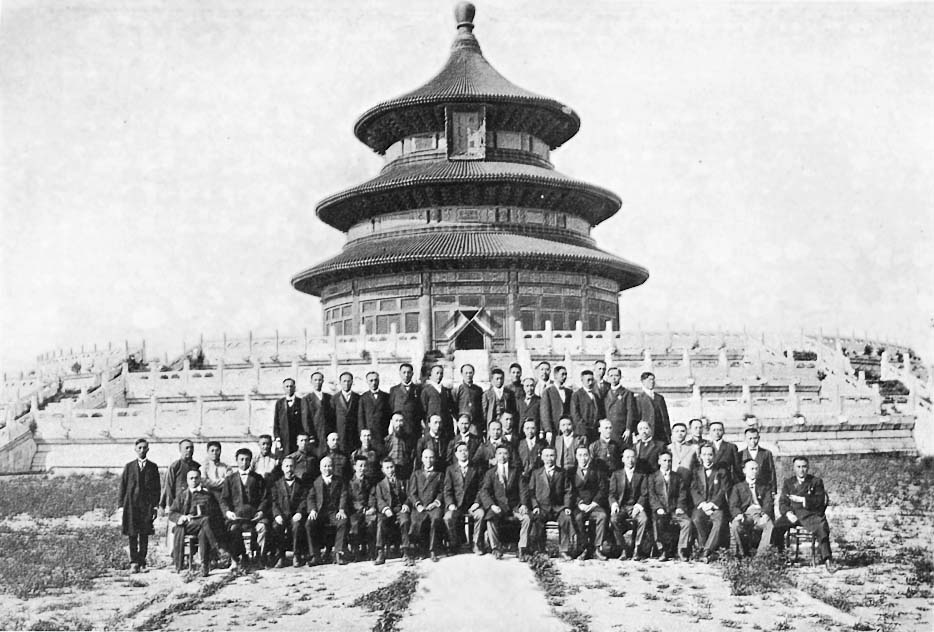
The original Constitutional Drafting Committee of the newly founded Republic of China, photographed on the steps of the Temple of Heaven in Beijing, where the draft was completed in 1913.

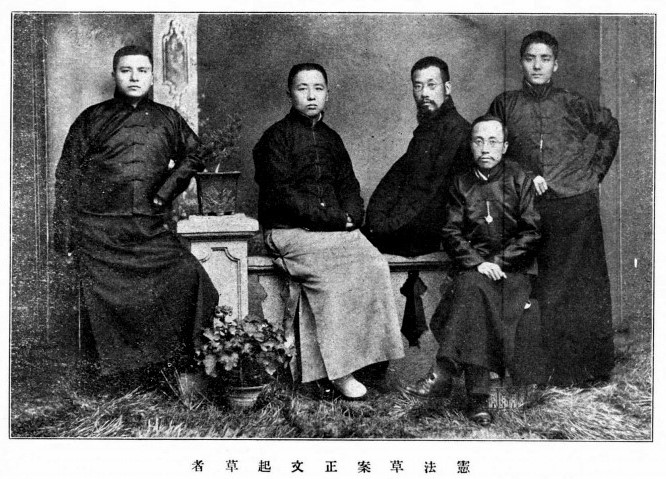
Drafting Committee members of the 1913 constitution draft

=== Drafting process ===
The constitution was first drafted by the Kuomintang (KMT) as part of its third stage of national development (i.e., representative democracy), it established a centralized republic with "five branches of government" (五權分立). The constitution traces its origins to the end of the Second Sino-Japanese War. The impending outbreak of the Chinese Civil War pressured Chiang Kai-shek into enacting a democratic Constitution that would end KMT one-party rule. The Communists sought a coalition of one-third Nationalists, one-third Communists, and one-third other parties, to form a government that would draft the new constitution. However, while rejecting this idea, the KMT and the CCP jointly held a convention at which both parties presented views. Amidst heated debate, many of the demands from the Communist Party were met, including the popular election of the Legislative Yuan. Together, these drafts are called the Constitutional Draft of the Political Convention (政協憲草). Professor John Ching Hsiung Wu, Vice-chairman of the Constitution Drafting Commission, was the principal author of the text.

The Constitution, with minor revisions from the latest draft, was adopted by the National Constituent Assembly session on 25 December 1946, in Nanjing, promulgated by the National Government on 1 January 1947, and the fifth and current Chinese constitution officially went into effect on 25 December 1947. The Constitution was seen as the third and final stage of Kuomintang reconstruction of China. The Communists, though they attended the convention, and participated in drafting the constitution, boycotted the National Assembly and declared after the ratification that not only would they not recognize the ROC constitution, but all bills passed by the Nationalist administration would be disregarded as well. However, due to their showing in the election (approx. 800 out of 3045 seats,) their boycott did not prevent the Assembly from reaching quorum and thus electing Chiang Kai-shek and Li Zongren as president and vice president respectively. Zhou Enlai challenged the legitimacy of the National Assembly in 1947 by asserting that the KMT hand-picked its members 10 years earlier, and thus the Assembly could not be the legal representatives of the Chinese people.

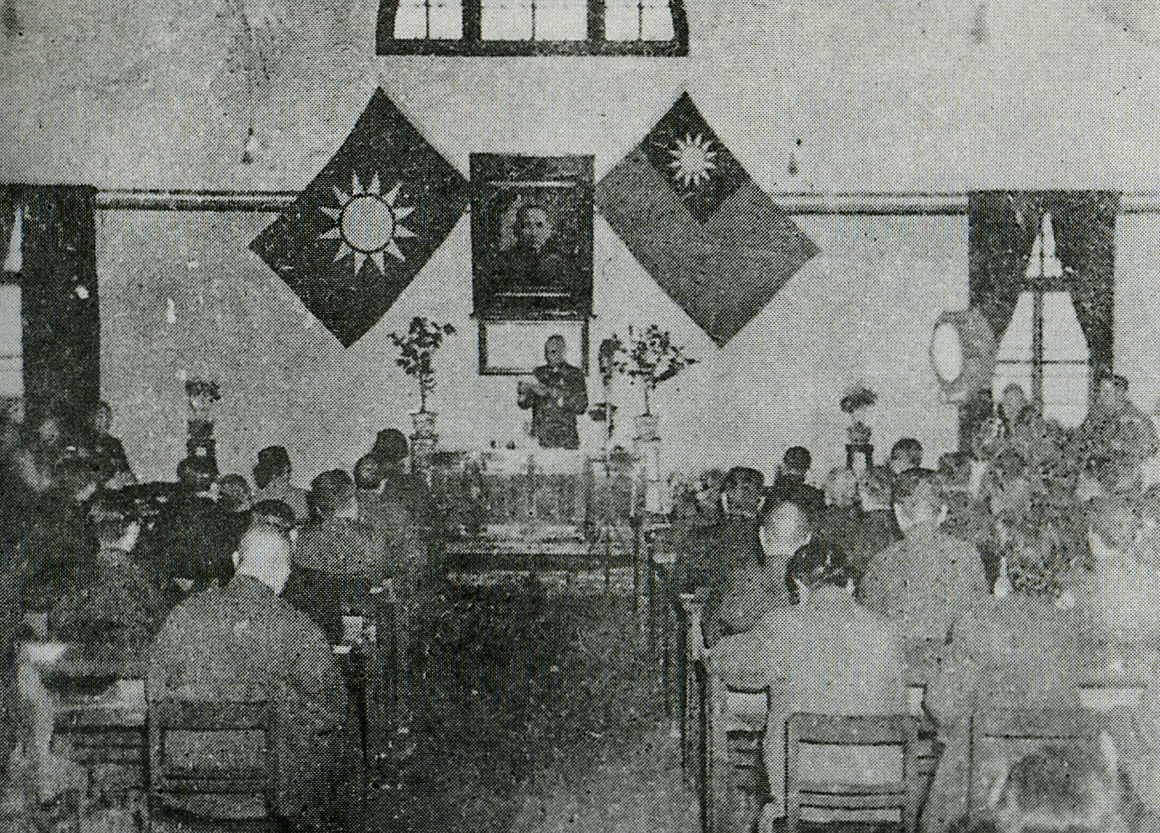
Political Consultative Conference in Chongqing, latest draft of the constitution was discussed by different political parties including Kuomintang and Chinese Communist Party.

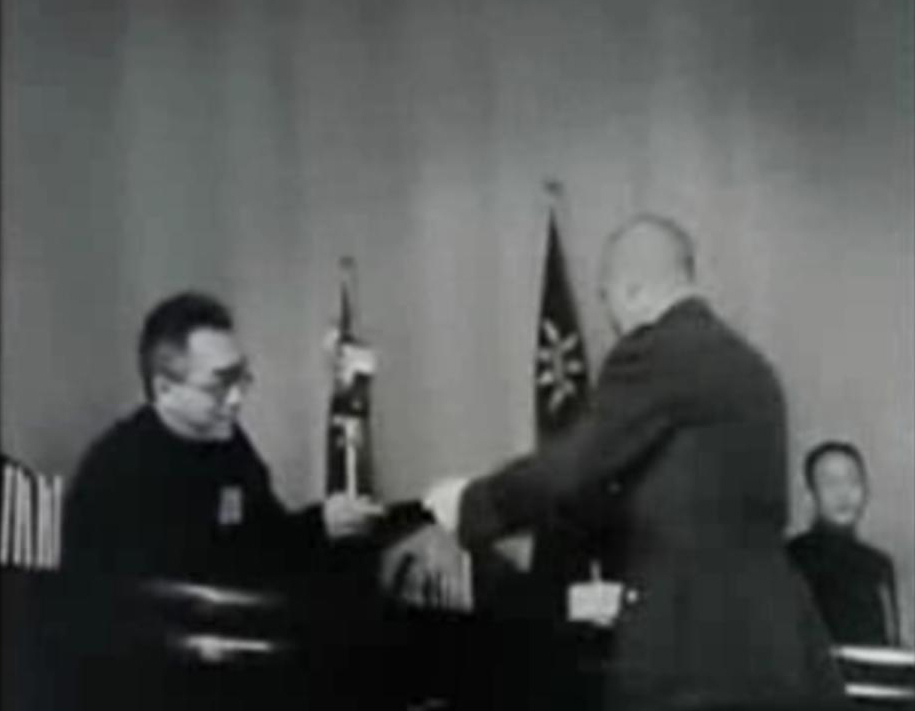
Chiang Kai-shek, chairman of the Nationalist Government, turned the draft approved by the Political Consultative Conference to Hu Shih, rotating chairman of the National Constituent Assembly.

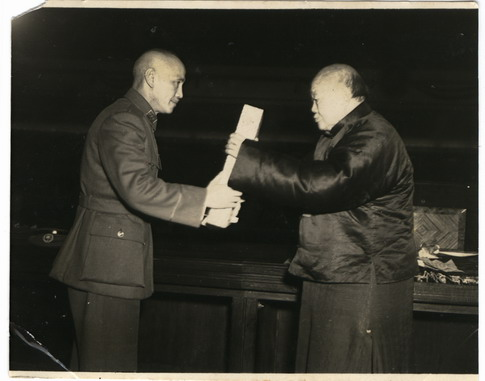
Wu Zhihui, chairman of the National Constituent Assembly, handed the ratified constitution to Chiang Kai-shek, chairman of the Nationalist Government.

== Content ==
=== Three Principles of the People ===
In Article 1, the Republic of China is founded upon the Three Principles of the People: Minzu (民族), Minquan (民權), and Minsheng (民生), roughly defined as nationalism, democracy, and the livelihood of the people. It establishes China as a "democratic republic of the People, by the people, and for the people." Article 2 affirms that national sovereignty is derived from the citizenry. According to Article 3, people of ROC nationality are citizens of the Republic of China. Finally, Article 5 guarantees equality among the nation's ethnic groups.

=== Civil and political rights of people ===
The basic civil rights and duties of the people are specified in Chapter 2 of the Constitution. Chapter 12 specifies four political rights of the people: election of public officials, recall of public officials, legislative initiative, and referendum.

=== Separation of Five Powers (Yuan) ===
Unlike the typical division of governmental branches, the ROC constitution establishes a five-power, semi-parliamentary mode of constitutional governance. The five branches of government or Yuan (院) include: the Executive Yuan, the Legislative Yuan, the Judicial Yuan, the Examination Yuan, and the Control Yuan. The separation of five powers is predicated on revolutionary Sun Yat-sen's political theory. In 1906, Sun Yat-sen proposed the five-power system for China, adding the Examination Yuan and the Control Yuan to improve governmental efficiency and preclude corruption. Under this system, the Examination Yuan administers the selection of bureaucratic candidates whereas the Control Yuan monitors governmental integrity. Chapters 5–9 of the Constitution stipulates the authorities of the five Yuan. Should constitutional disputes arise between the Yuan, Article 44 authorizes the President to intervene with mediation sessions. This power, however, can be checked by the Yuan, who retain the ability to reject presidential calls for mediation.

=== Racial groups in frontier regions ===
The ideology of the Chinese Nationalist Party during the Xinhai Revolution was to create unity between the five traditional ethnic groups in China (Han, Manchus, Mongols, Hui (Muslims), and Tibetans) in order to stand up to European and Japanese imperialism as one, strong nation. The constitution has articles to protect the equality of different races and the political rights of racial groups in frontier regions. However, since some provinces similar to China proper have been created on Manchuria and Xinjiang. Only the protection of local autonomy in Inner Mongolian Area, and Tibet Area were regulated explicitly.

== Divisions of state authority ==
=== The National Assembly ===
Based on Sun Yat-sen's political theory, the ROC Constitution distinguishes political powers from governing powers, creating another dimension for checks and balances. The Constitution introduced a powerful authoritative legislative body—the National Assembly, which exercised political powers derived from the people (Article 25). Thus, the National Assembly served to check national institutions with governing powers: the Presidency and the Five Yuan. Members of the National Assembly were directly elected by the people for six-year terms in open elections (Article 28). Under Article 27, the National Assembly had the right to amend the Constitution, exercise initiatives and referendums on the behalf of citizens, and elect or recall the President and the Vice President. Along with the Legislative Yuan and Control Yuan, the National Assembly featured parliamentary functions, sparking confusion around which institution served as the nation's parliament. The Legislative Yuan, National Assembly, and Control Yuan were all citizen-elected bodies; similarly, the National Assembly and Control Yuan exercised constitutional powers similar to powers granted to the legislative branch of Western constitutional governments. In 1957, the Constitutional Court ruled that the National Assembly, Legislative Yuan, and Control Yuan were all "equivalent to the parliaments of democratic nations", creating a tripartite parliamentary system. Constitutional reforms of the 1990s later sought to condense the powers and functions of the three parliaments into one body. After gradually transferring powers to the Legislative Yuan, the National Assembly abolished itself in 2005.

=== The Presidency ===
The President of the Republic of China (Chinese: 總統; pinyin: Zǒngtǒng) is the head of state and the Commander-in-Chief of the Republic of China Armed Forces. Until 1996, the President and Vice President were elected by the National Assembly. After several rounds of constitutional revisions in the 1990s, the President became elected through universal free elections in 1996. Both the President and Vice President serve terms of four years and may be re-elected for an additional term. Originally, the ROC constitution drafted the president as a ceremonial figurehead presiding over a parliamentary republic: the President could grant amnesty and pardons (Article 40), confer honors and decorations (Article 42), issue emergency decrees (Article 43), and issue arbitration during disputes between multiple Yuan (Article 44). Other articles enumerated pertinent powers, permitting the President to declare war and make peace (Article 38), declare martial law with the approval of the Legislative Yuan (Article 39), and appoint or remove military officials (Article 41). However, a combination of the Chinese civil war and President Chiang Kai-shek's strong authoritarian impulses led to a dramatic expansion of presidential powers, shifting the ROC to a semi-presidential constitutional regime. In 1948, the National Assembly ratified the Temporary Provisions against the Communist Rebellion, which superseded the Constitution by granting the President enhanced administrative and executive capabilities. Under the Temporary Provisions, the President was no longer obligated to gain the Legislative Yuan's approval when declaring martial law as stipulated in Article 39. Additionally, the President and the Vice President could disregard the two-term limit for re-election as described in Article 47. As a result, Chiang Kai-shek served five six-year terms (twenty-seven years) as president before his death in 1975. The Temporary Provisions would persist in Taiwan for forty-three years until it was repealed in 1991. Nonetheless, the role of the President remains constitutionally ambiguous even today.

=== The Executive Yuan ===
The Executive Yuan (行政院; Xíngzhèngyuàn) is the executive branch of the ROC government and is the "highest administrative organ of the State." The President of the Executive Yuan is the Premier, who is appointed by the President of the Republic of China, and no longer requires consent from the Legislative Yuan. The Premier may be removed by a vote of no-confidence by a majority of the Legislative Yuan, after which the President may either remove the Premier or dissolve the Legislative Yuan and initiate a new election for legislators. Given the semi-presidential mode of constitutional governance, the Premier is the head of government while the President of the Republic is the head of state. Although the Premier is held accountable to the Legislative Yuan—a common feature of parliamentary systems—the presidential expansion of power has altered checks and balances between the branches of government; functionally, the Premier has become subordinate to the President.

The Executive Yuan Council, referred to as "the cabinet" (內閣; Nèigé), is composed of a Premier, a Vice Premier, a certain number of Ministers and Chairmen of Commissions, and a certain number of Ministers without Portfolio (MWPs). Under Article 56, these cabinet members are appointed by the President upon the recommendation of the Premier. The Cabinet serves as the primary policy-making body of the executive branch, convening over administrative matters in weekly Cabinet meetings. Article 58 authorizes the Cabinet to assess statutory or budgetary bills concerning martial law or amnesty, declaration of war, conclusion of peace or treaties, and other affairs; the Cabinet subsequently submit bills to the Legislative Yuan. The Cabinet conducts decision-making through a single majority vote, which may be vetoed by the Premier. Additionally, the Cabinet presides over "matters that are of common concern to the various Ministries and Commissions."

=== The Legislative Yuan ===
The Legislative Yuan (立法院; Lìfǎyuàn) is the unicameral legislature of the ROC government and is the "highest legislative organ of the State." The Legislative Yuan is composed of 113 legislators, who are directly elected by voters through a parallel voting system for 4-year terms. Like parliaments in other countries, the Legislative Yuan passes legislation, which is later sent to the President for signing. The Legislative Yuan is led by a President and Vice President, who are elected by all members of the Yuan. The President of the Legislative Yuan then presides over Yuan sittings, periodic meetings of the Yuan.

According to Chapter IV, the Executive Yuan is accountable to the Legislative Yuan. Article 63 empowers the Legislative Yuan to approve statutory or budgetary bills or bills sent by the Executive Yuan. Under Article 57, should the Legislative Yuan not concur with major policies of the Executive Yuan, "it may, by resolution, request the Executive Yuan to alter such a policy." Then, the Executive Yuan must respond to this resolution and can request alterations to the bill. The Executive Yuan may also request the Legislative Yuan reconsider its resolution after gaining approval from the President of the Republic. If two-thirds of the Legislative Yuan uphold the original resolution after reconsideration, the Premier shall abide the resolution or resign from office.

=== Local governments: Provinces and Counties ===
In Chapter XI of the Constitution, the country consists of two types of levels of local government: Provinces (first level, Section I) and Counties (second-level, Section II).

A map showing the official divisions and territories historically claimed by the Republic of China, along with their status as of 2005

Political divisions as drawn by the Republic of China and the People's Republic of China

A province is the first-level divisions of the country. It consists of 35 provinces, 1 special administrative region, 2 regions, 18 special municipalities, 14 leagues, and 4 special banners. According to Article 113, each provincial-level governments shall have a provincial council and governor with its members of the provincial council directly elected by the people of the province. Article 118 describes the self-government of municipalities under the direct jurisdiction of the Executive Yuan. Articles 119 and 120 preserved the autonomy of Inner Mongolia (includes Leagues and Banners) and Kashag-led Tibet.

Counties (also spelled as hsien) consists of second-level divisions under provinces with 2,035 counties, 56 province-controlled cities, 34 bureaus and 7 management bureaus with special municipalities and leagues consisting of districts and 127 banners. Articles 124 and 126 describes each county-level governments require a county council and magistrate with each member and magistrate shall be elected by the people within the county. In Article 127 a magistrate are heads of the local county self-government and shall administer matters delegated to the county by the central or provincial government.

However, despite the major loss of its territory, even after democratization, the provinces began to be streamlined in 1998 with the counties and provincial cities governed directly under the Executive Yuan and the Tsai Ing-wen administration de facto suspended all provincial governments by 2018.

== Suspension of the constitution and martial law ==
Implementation of this constitution made China, then with a population of 450 million, the most populous "paper democracy". Though the Constitution was intended for the whole China, it was neither extensively nor effectively implemented as the KMT was already fully embroiled in a civil war with the Chinese Communist Party by the time of its promulgation.

On 10 January 1947, Governor Chen Yi announced that the new ROC Constitution would not apply to Taiwan after it went into effect in mainland China on 25 December 1947, as Taiwan was still under military occupation and also that Taiwanese were politically naive and were not capable of self-governing. Later that year, Chen Yi was dismissed and the Taiwan Provincial Government was established.

On 18 April 1948, the National Assembly added to the Constitution the "Temporary Provisions against the Communist Rebellion". The Temporary Provisions came into force on 10 May 1948, ten days before the inauguration of the first President of the Republic of China. These articles greatly enhanced the power of the president and abolished the two term limit for the president and the vice president. Since December 7, 1949, the ROC only controls the "free area of the Republic of China", which is essentially Taiwan, Penghu, Kinmen, Matsu, Pratas and Taiping Island, the only territories not lost to the Chinese Communists in the Chinese Civil War.

From March 1947 until 1987, Taiwan was in a state of martial law. Although the constitution provided for regular democratic elections, these were not held in Taiwan until the 1990s. In 1954, the Judicial Yuan ruled that the delegates elected to the National Assembly and Legislative Yuan in 1947 would remain in office until new elections could be held in Mainland China which had come under the control of the Chinese Communist Party in 1949. This judicial ruling allowed the Kuomintang to rule unchallenged in Taiwan until the 1990s. In the 1970s, supplemental elections began to be held for the Legislative Yuan. Although these were for a limited number of seats, they did allow for the transition to a more open political system. In 1991, these members were ordered to resign by a subsequent Judicial Yuan ruling.

== Democratisation ==
In the late 1980s, the Constitution faced the growing democratisation on Taiwan combined with the mortality of the delegates that were elected in 1947. Faced with these pressures, on 22 April 1991, the first National Assembly voted itself out of office, abolished the Temporary Provisions passed in 1948, and adopted major amendments (known as the "First Revision") permitting free elections.

On 27 May 1992, several other amendments were passed (known as the "Second Revision"), most notably that allowing the direct election of the President of the Republic of China, Governor of Taiwan Province, and municipal mayors. Ten new amendments to replace the eighteen amendments of the First and Second Revisions were passed on 28 July 1994. The amendments that passed in July 1997 streamlined the Taiwan Provincial Government and granted the Legislative Yuan powers of impeachment. The constitution was subsequently revised in 1999 and 2000, with the former revision being declared void the same year by the Council of Grand Justices. A further revision of the constitution happened in 2005 which disbanded the National Assembly, reformed the Legislative Yuan, and provided for future constitutional change to be ratified by referendum.

Passing an amendment to the ROC constitution now requires an unusually broad political consensus, which includes approval from three-fourths of the quorum of members of the Legislative Yuan. This quorum requires at least three-fourths of all members of the Legislature. After passing the Legislature, the amendments need ratification by at least fifty percent of all eligible voters of the ROC irrespective of voter turnout.

Because the ROC constitution is, at least nominally, the constitution of all China, the amendments avoided any specific reference to the Taiwan area and instead used the geographically neutral term "Free Area of the Republic of China" to refer to all areas under ROC control. All post-1991 amendments have been maintained as a separate part of the Constitution, consolidated into a single text of twelve articles.

== Issues ==
=== Challenge of legitimacy ===
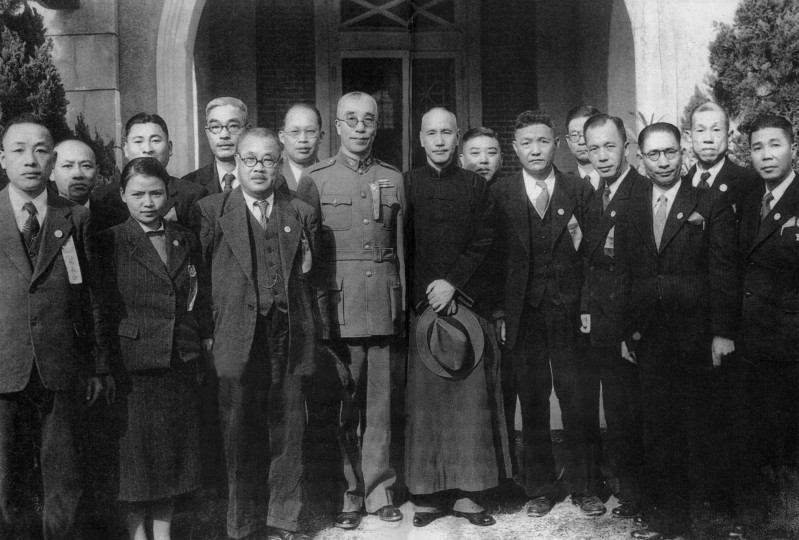
Seventeen National Assembly delegates elected to represent Taiwan Province in a photo with then President Chiang Kai-shek in 1946

A number of criticisms have been leveled at the constitution by supporters of Taiwan independence. Until the 1990s when the Democratic Progressive Party (DPP) joined the Kuomintang (KMT) in amending the constitution, the document was considered illegitimate by pro-independence advocates because it was not drafted in Taiwan; moreover, they deemed Taiwan to be sovereign Japanese territory until ceded in the San Francisco Peace Treaty effective 28 April 1952. Pro-independence advocates have argued that the Constitution was never legally applied to Taiwan because Taiwan was not formally incorporated into the ROC's territory through the National Assembly as per the specifications of Article 4. Though the constitution promulgated in 1946 did not define the territory of the Republic of China, while the draft of the constitution of 1925 individually listed the provinces of the Republic of China and Taiwan was not among them, since Taiwan was part of Japan as the result of the Treaty of Shimonoseki of 1895. The constitution also stipulated in the Article I.4, that "the territory of the ROC is the original territory governed by it, unless authorized by the National Assembly, can not be altered."

In 1946, Sun Fo, the minister of the Executive Yuan of ROC reported to the National Assembly that "there are two types of territory changes: 1. renouncing territory and 2. annexing new territory. The first example would be the Independence of Outer Mongolia, and the second example would be the reclamation of Taiwan. Both would be examples of territory changes". No such formal annexation of Taiwan islands by the ROC National Assembly conforming with the ROC constitution ever occurred since 1946, even though Article 9 of the Additional Articles of the Constitution of the Republic of China says, "The modifications of the functions, operations, and organization of the Taiwan Provincial Government may be specified by law." The Republic of China argues that sovereignty of the Republic of China over Taiwan was established by the Instrument of Surrender of Japan which implemented the Potsdam Declaration and the Cairo Declaration. The Allies have not agreed or disagreed to this rationale. In addition, the ROC argues that the Article 4 of 1952 Treaty of Taipei nullifies the Treaty of Shimonoseki and the original transfer of sovereignty of Taiwan from China to Japan. Since control of Taiwan occurred in 1945 before the promulgation of the 1947 constitution, the ROC government is of the view that a resolution by the National Assembly was unnecessary.

While both symbolic and legal arguments have been used to discredit the application of the Constitution in Taiwan, the document gained more legitimacy among independence supporters throughout the late 1980s and early 1990s due to democratization and it is now accepted as the basic law of the ROC by all major parties, and considered the Constitution representing the sovereignty of Taiwan. However, there are proposals, particularly by supporters of Taiwan independence and the supporters of Taiwan localization movement, to replace the current Constitution with a document drafted by the Taiwanese constituencies in Taiwan.

=== Referendums and constitutional reform ===
One recent controversy involving the constitution is the right to referendum which is mentioned in the Constitution. The constitution states that "The exercise of the rights of initiative and referendum shall be prescribed by law", but legislation prescribing the practices had been blocked by the pan-blue coalition largely out of suspicions that proponents of a referendum law would be used to overturn the ROC Constitution and provide a means to declare Taiwan independence. A referendum law was passed on 27 November 2003 and signed by President Chen Shui-bian on 31 December 2003, but the law sets high standards for referendums such as the requirement that they can only be called by the President in times of imminent attack.

In 2003, President Chen Shui-bian proposed holding a referendum in 2006 for implementing an entirely new constitution on 20 May 2008, to coincide with the inauguration of the 12th-term president of the ROC. Proponents of such a move, namely the Pan-Green Coalition, argue that the current Constitution endorses a specific ideology (i.e., the Three Principles of the People), which is only appropriate for Communist states; in addition, they argue that a more "efficient" government is needed to cope with changing realities. Some proponents support replacing the five-branch structure outlined by the Three Principles of the People with a three-branch government. Others cite the current deadlock between the executive and legislative branches and support replacing the presidential system with a parliamentary system. Furthermore, the current Constitution explicitly states before the amendments implemented on Taiwan, "To meet the requisites of the nation prior to national unification...", in direct opposition to the pan-green position that Taiwan must remain separated from China. In response, the pan-blue coalition dropped its opposition to non-constitutional referendums and offered to consider through going constitutional reforms.

The proposal to implement an entirely new constitution met with strong opposition from the People's Republic of China and great unease from the United States, both of which feared the proposal to rewrite the constitution to be a veiled effort to achieve Taiwan independence, as it would sever a historic link to mainland China, and to circumvent Chen's original Four Noes and One Without pledge. In December 2003, the United States announced its opposition to any referendum that would tend to move Taiwan toward formal "independence", a statement that was widely seen as being directed at Chen's constitutional proposals.

In response, the Pan-Blue Coalition attempted to argue that a new constitution and constitutional referendums were unnecessary and that the inefficiencies in the ROC Constitution could be approved through the normal legislative process.

In his May 20, 2004, inaugural address, Chen called for a "Constitutional Reform Committee" to be formed by "members of the ruling party and the opposition parties, as well as legal experts, academic scholars and representatives from all fields and spanning all social classes" to decide on the proper reforms. He promised that the new constitution would not change the issue of sovereignty and territory. This proposal went nowhere due to lack of cooperation from the opposition Pan-Blue.

The Kuomintang government in power from 2008 to 2016 halted efforts to write a new constitution in Taiwan. Former President Ma Ying-jeou stated that constitutional reform was not a priority for his government.

After that, Taiwan was once again governed by the Democratic Progressive Party, but they promised to maintain Taiwan's status quo, and their proposed constitutional amendments were not passed.

=== Definition of national territory ===
Different interpretations of the territories claimed by the Republic of China, with the ROC National Assembly's interpretation in 1979 on the left and the ROC Ministry of the Interior's interpretation in 2017 on the right.

The interpretation of Article 4, that "the territory of the ROC is the original territory governed by it, unless authorized by the National Assembly, can not be altered." has generated several issues with regards to topics such as the political status of Taiwan, the representation of Taiwan in the United Nations and Taiwanese foreign policy. When the wording of the clause was chosen in 1946, the territory of the ROC contained both mainland China and Taiwan areas, while the ROC government was deemed as the representative of China with UN. When the ROC constitution was later amended in 2005, it only shifted the authority to alter the ROC's national territory from the National Assembly to a public referendum, but no National Assembly resolution nor public referendums were ever held to delimit ROC's current day border around the Taiwan Area as defined in the Article 2 of Cross-Strait Act. This ambiguity around the ROC's constitutionally claimed territory has raised several questions, such as whether the current government in Taiwan can be regarded as the representative government of China instead of Taiwan, whether a clearly defined border actually exists between China and Taiwan, and whether Taiwan inherits past territorial disputes with China's neighbors such as Mongolia, India, Myanmar and South China Sea nations.

The ROC Judicial Yuan had issued several rulings related to the definition of national territory. On 12 April 1993, the Legislative Yuan applied for a constitutional interpretation to ask what the boundaries of the ROC national territory would be with regards to whether Outer Mongolia should be included in the ROC territory. In its reply, the Constitutional Court of Judicial Yuan, in its Interpretation 328 on 26 November 1993, called the constitutional territory beyond the reach of judicial review. However, in a separate ruling that affirms ROC Criminal Code's jurisdiction over crimes committed against residents of mainland China, the Supreme Court of Judicial Yuan, in its Appeal 334 in 2019, states that ROC still claims sovereignty over mainland China as part of its territory by referencing Article 4.

One legal theory to resolve the national territory ambiguity has been put forward by supporters of Huadu (Republic of China independence) position, which posits that the current constitutional practice of Taiwanese government to accept CCP's authority over mainland China due to the repeal of Temporary Provisions and the creation of the Cross-Strait Act should supersede the strict text interpretation of Article 4. This legal theory rests on the fact that the Additional Articles have altered the original ROC Constitution sufficiently to represent a clear break from the old ROC state to a new Taiwanese ROC state after the democratization process in the 1990s (see Second Republic of China).

== See also ==
- Qinding Xianfa Dagang
- Provisional Constitution of the Republic of China
- Additional Articles of the Constitution of the Republic of China
- Constitution of China
- History of the Republic of China
- Politics of the Republic of China
- Kuomintang
- Democratic Progressive Party
- History of Taiwan
- Referendums in Taiwan
