= 2025 Taiwanese referendum =

Nationwide referendum proposal 21
- 23 August 2025
- Voting system: The initiative is ratified if votes in favor exceed a quarter of eligible voters (5,000,523) and the number of votes not in favor.
- Outcome: Failed due to insufficient votes

Results
Choice	Votes	%
Yes	4,341,432	74.17%
No	1,511,693	25.83%
Valid votes	5,853,125	99.10%
Invalid or blank votes	53,245	0.90%
Total votes	5,906,370	100.00%
Registered voters/turnout	20,002,091	29.53%

Do you agree that the Third Nuclear Power Plant should continue operating, provided that the competent authority confirms there are no safety concerns?
Yes	74.17%
No	25.83%
Proposal failed; votes in favor did not exceed a quarter of eligible voters

A national referendum was held on 23 August 2025 in Taiwan. Backed by the Kuomintang (KMT) and Taiwan People's Party (TPP), the Legislative Yuan considered four referendum proposals. Only one proposal, on whether to reverse the decommissioning of the Maanshan Nuclear Power Plant's second reactor, was approved by the Central Election Commission. The initiative was defeated after the number of votes in favor of the motion fell short of the threshold of a quarter of the eligible voters.

== Background ==
In early March 2025, the Kuomintang (KMT) began considering referendum proposals in response to the 2025 Taiwanese mass electoral recall campaigns. Topics considered for referendums included capital punishment, which had been subject to a Constitutional Court hearing the previous year, and the use of military courts, which President Lai Ching-te suggested reinstating as a result of increased infiltration attempts by China.

On 17 March 2025, the Kuomintang started campaigning for referendums on "opposing the abolition of the death penalty" and "opposing martial law" to be held. Both proposals made it through a second reading without review by a Legislative Yuan committee. After the bills were advanced, the Democratic Progressive Party's (DPP) caucus leader Rosalia Wu stated that the Kuomintang and Taiwan People's Party (TPP) had conducted a "nighttime raid" instead of utilizing proper legislative procedures, and the DPP organized a sit-in within the legislature. Shortly thereafter, the Central Election Commission (CEC) stated that the issues needed "collective consideration and review from multiple perspectives". Despite continued protests from Democratic Progressive Party legislators, both proposals were formally placed on the Legislative Yuan's agenda for 16 May 2025, and the referendum pertaining to the death penalty was passed without committee review, while a vote on the martial law referendum proposal was postponed to the following week.

On 18 April 2025, the Kuomintang and Taiwan People's Party advanced two more referendum proposals to a second legislative reading without review by a Legislative Yuan committee. The first referendum proposal of April 2025, on absentee voting and formally proposed by the TPP, premier Cho Jung-tai described as "completely unfeasible" due to potential manipulation by China. The other referendum proposal considered in April was related to the closure of the Maanshan Nuclear Power Plant's second reactor. On 13 May 2025, the Legislative Yuan voted to allow licenses for active nuclear power plants to be renewed for an additional twenty-year period. President Lai Ching-te opposed passage of the bill, stating that restarting Maanshan's second reactor would require a substantive review process. The reactor was duly disconnected on 17 May 2025. The referendum on restarting Maanshan's second reactor was approved three days after the reactor had fully shut down.

On 23 May 2025, the Kuomintang announced that the referendum proposals on absentee voting and martial law had missed the deadline to be voted on in August.

== Scheduling, polling, and pre-referendum debates ==
The Central Election Commission rejected the death penalty referendum proposal on 23 May 2025, and approved the Maanshan Nuclear Power Plant proposal on the same day, formally setting the referendum to be held on 23 August 2025. On 13 June, the Kuomintang and Taiwan People's Party voted to bypass legislative committee review and advanced a proposed administrative lawsuit against the Central Election Commission. On 21 June, the CEC announced that five public forums would be held between 7–15 August. The Legislative Yuan would represent supporters of the referendum, while the Executive Yuan or affiliated agencies would represent opposition to the referendum.

At the first debate on 7 August, Yeh Tsung-kuang, director of National Tsing Hua University's College of Nuclear Science, discussed the potential for power shortages if Maanshan were not reactivated. Taiwan Power Company chairman Tseng Wen-sheng opined that the referendum should not be held yet, because "safety concerns" had not yet been clearly defined or resolved. Although Tseng argued against the referendum during the debate with Yeh, Tseng later expressed support for safety checks to be performed at Maanshan. Deputy executive director Lin Tze-luen of the Office of Energy and Carbon Reduction, under the Executive Yuan, faced legislator Weng Hsiao-ling on 9 August. Lin discussed issues with nuclear waste disposal and advocated for the increased use of renewable energy instead of relying on nuclear power plants such as Maanshan. In response, Weng stated that renewable energy sources were more expensive, and said that the current methods of power generation in Taiwan, primarily the burning of coal, were causing air pollution that led to increased health risks. On 11 August, the debate between Green Party Taiwan co-convenor Kan Chung-wei and Huang Shih-hsiu of the Nuclear Myth Busters focused on Maanshan's infrastructure and earthquake preparedness. Anti-nuclear activist Wu Ya-hsin continued discussing earthquake-related risks in the fourth debate on 13 August by drawing comparisons to the Fukushima nuclear accident, while Taiwan People's Party chair Huang Kuo-chang pointed out that several surveys had shown Taiwanese were supportive of nuclear power. Huang additionally commented that nuclear waste could be neutralized via deep borehole disposal.

In early July, Green Party Taiwan and Pingtung County residents separately protested against the potential reactivation of Maanshan. On 4 August, the Wild at Heart Legal Defense Association hosted a press conference at the Legislative Yuan featuring He Li-wei, a member of Pingtung County's Oversight Nuclear Safety Commission, public health academic Hsieh Wan-hua, and a former Taiwan Power Company employee who had worked at the Jinshan and Kuosheng power plants, each of whom opposed reactivation of Maanshan. On 13 August President Lai, speaking in his capacity as chairman of the Democratic Progressive Party in a meeting with DPP Central Standing Committee members, advised people to vote against the referendum. On 16 August, the Taiwan Environmental Protection Union protested the potential reactivation of Maanshan, and were joined by approximately 300 people representing the Taiwan Society North, World United Formosans for Independence, Green Party Taiwan and the New Power Party. The protesters walked from National Taiwan University through Liberty Square to the Legislative Yuan Building. On 19 August, a group of 533 academics signed an open letter calling on voters to oppose the referendum. Chou Chun-mi, the Pingtung County Magistrate, addressed a protest in Pingtung City on 20 August organized by local agricultural, fisheries and tourism organizations, and supported their call to vote against the referendum.

On 1 August, the Nuclear Safety Commission proposed amendments to the Regulations on the Application for an Operating License of Nuclear Reactor Facilities for public commentary. The proposed license renewal application process requires submission of a reactivation plan, a radiation assessment, and earthquake safety reports. A poll conducted by the Taiwanese Public Opinion Foundation in early August used the same phrasing as the referendum question, and found that 38.7% of people "completely agreed" with the referendum as proposed, 27.7% "somewhat agreed", 11.7% “somewhat disagreed” and 10.4% “completely disagreed". Respondents who identified as supporters of the Democratic Progressive Party were split 46% to 45% in favor of restarting Maanshan, while people who backed the Kuomintang and Taiwan People's Party supported the proposed restart by majorities of 87% and 93% respectively.

== Results ==
According to Article 29 of the Referendum Act, a referendum is passed if the valid ballots in favor exceed the ballots against, and the valid ballots in favor exceeds 25% of the eligible electorate. The Central Election Commission determined that there were 20,002,091 eligible voters, and 5,000,523 yes votes must be cast for the referendum result to be binding. Polls were open from 8:00 to 16:00 on 23 August 2025. The Central Election Commission reported that voter turnout reached 29.53%. Of the votes cast, 4.34 million or 21.7% of people voted yes, and 1.51 million or 7.5% voted no. Political scientist Su Tzu-chiao of Soochow University attributed the turnout to the contested nature of the referendum question, and additionally to voter fatigue, as the first round of the 2025 Taiwanese recall votes had taken place in the previous month. Although the referendum failed, President Lai acknowledged that the result showed that Taiwanese sought "diversified energy options". Lai indicated that he would consider exploring nuclear power options that reduced waste and increased safety. Japanese political scientist Yoshiyuki Ogasawara observed that the decade-long advantage which helped the DPP win presidential elections in 2016, 2020, and 2024, as well as legislative majorities in 2016 and 2020, had ended.

Party	% of valid vote		% of electorate	
Party	Votes	%	Votes	%
For	4,341,432	74.17	4,341,432	21.70
Against	1,511,693	25.83	1,511,693	7.56
Total	5,853,125	100.00	5,853,125	100.00
Valid votes	5,853,125	99.10		
Invalid/blank votes	53,245	0.90		
Total votes	5,906,370	100.00		
Registered voters/turnout	20,002,091	29.53		

=== Results by administrative subdivision ===
Regions	Electorate	In favor			Against			Valid votes	Invalid votes	Total	Turnout (%)
Regions	Electorate	Tally	Percent of electorate	Differences from threshold	Tally	Percent of valid votes	Differences from in favor	Valid votes	Invalid votes	Total	Turnout (%)
Taipei City	2,087,808	475,403	22.77%	−46,549	150,152	24.00%	−325,251	625,555	4,330	629,885	30.17%
New Taipei City	3,501,235	777,046	22.19%	−98,263	262,784	25.27%	−514,262	1,039,830	8,083	1,047,913	29.93%
Taoyuan City	1,971,813	429,306	21.77%	−63,648	98,886	18.72%	−330,420	528,192	4,022	532,214	26.99%
Taichung City	2,416,540	645,486	26.71%	+41,351	212,952	24.81%	−432,534	858,438	11,142	869,580	35.98%
Tainan City	1,600,962	281,553	17.59%	−118,688	141,687	33.48%	−139,866	423,240	3,001	426,241	26.62%
Kaohsiung City	2,358,186	423,651	17.97%	−165,896	229,579	35.15%	−194,072	653,230	3,768	656,998	27.86%
Hsinchu County	488,509	149,516	30.61%	+27,388	36,135	19.46%	−113,381	185,651	2,639	188,290	38.54%
Miaoli County	457,783	113,477	24.79%	−969	17,612	13.44%	−95,865	131,089	1,457	132,546	28.95%
Changhua County	1,042,775	222,117	21.30%	−38,577	56,089	20.16%	−166,028	278,206	2,943	281,149	26.96%
Nantou county	410,405	136,907	33.36%	+34,305	53,895	28.25%	−83,012	190,802	3,712	194,514	47.40%
Yunlin County	567,994	98,165	17.28%	−43,834	29,429	23.06%	−68,736	127,594	1,104	128,698	22.66%
Chiayi County	424,950	71,315	16.78%	−34,920	27,545	27.86%	−43,770	98,860	722	99,582	23.43%
Pingtung County	688,202	120,720	17.54%	−51,331	90,460	42.84%	−30,260	211,180	2,186	213,366	31.00%
Yilan County	388,906	62,075	15.96%	−35,152	26,003	29.52%	−36,072	88,078	715	88,793	9.04%
Hualien County	271,519	63,040	23.22%	−4,840	9,956	13.64%	−53,084	72,996	833	73,829	27.19%
Taitung County	181,146	37,858	20.90%	−7,429	7,191	15.96%	−30,667	45,049	449	45,498	25.12%
Penghu County	94,412	13,180	13.96%	−10,423	4,012	23.34%	−9,168	17,192	143	17,335	18.36%
Kinmen County	125,917	14,524	11.53%	−16,956	893	5.79%	−13,631	15,417	176	15,593	12.38%
Lienchiang County	11,944	2,129	17.82%	−857	136	6.00%	−2,097	2,265	32	2,297	19.23%
Keelung City	318,691	70,703	22.19%	−8,970	17,895	20.20%	−52,808	88,598	660	89,258	28.01%
Hsinchu City	370,898	89,585	24.15%	−3,140	21,123	19.08%	−68,462	110,708	757	111,465	30.05%
Chiayi City	221,496	43,674	19.72%	−11,700	17,279	28.35%	−26,395	60,953	371	61,324	27.69%
