= Maanshan Nuclear Power Plant =

Nuclear power plant in Hengchun, Pingtung County, Taiwan

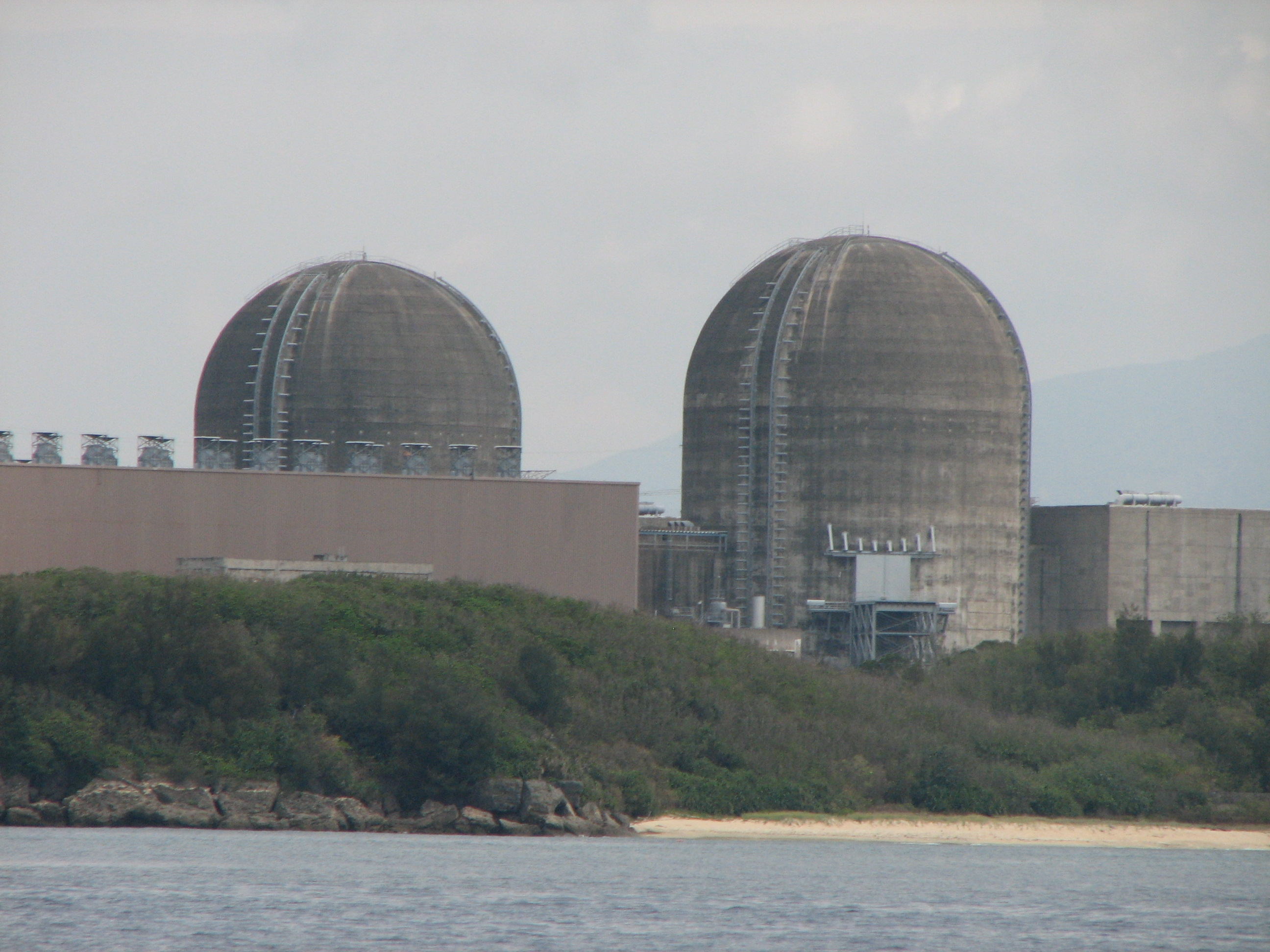
- Official name: 馬鞍山核能發電廠
- Country: Taiwan
- Location: Hengchun, Pingtung County
- Coordinates: 21°57′30″N 120°45′5″E
- Status: Decommissioned
- Commission date: 27 July 1984 (Unit 1); 18 May 1985 (Unit 2)
- Decommission date: 26 July 2024 (Unit 1, license expiration); 17 May 2025 (Unit 2, license expiration)
- Owner: Taipower
- Operator: Taipower

Nuclear power station
- Reactor type: PWR
- Reactor supplier: Westinghouse Electric

Power generation
- Units operational: 2 × 951 MW
- Make and model: General Electric
- Nameplate capacity: 1,902 MW
- Capacity factor: 90.0%
- Annual net output: 15,000 GW·h

External links
- Website: wapp4.taipower.com.tw/nsis/option0-3.asp
- Commons: Related media on Commons

The Maanshan Nuclear Power Plant (Chinese: 馬鞍山核能發電廠; pinyin: Mǎ'ānshān Hénéng Fādiànchǎng or 核三; Hésān) was a nuclear power plant located near South Bay, Hengchun, Pingtung County, Taiwan. The plant was Taiwan's third nuclear power plant and second-largest in generation capacity. Its two reactors were commissioned in 1984 and 1985, respectively, and shut down upon the expiration of each reactor's license, in 2024 and 2025. However, with the 2025 revision by the Legislative Yuan of the Nuclear Reactor Facilities Regulation Act, plans for the restart of both units is under way and targeted for 2028 as of 2026.

== Generation ==
Each unit at Maanshan was a three-loop Westinghouse PWR with three Westinghouse type F steam generators. Each steam generator has 5626 U-bend tubes made of thermally treated Inconel 600 alloy. The power plant could generate 15 TWh of electricity per year.

== Events ==
=== 1985 ===
On 7 July 1985 a turbine blade failure at Maanshan Unit 1 led to a fire and reactor trip. When the blades failed, the resulting turbine imbalance allowed hydrogen and seal oil to escape from the generator. It took approximately 2 hours for the fire to be extinguished, but no systems critical to safe operation and shutdown were affected. The subsequent repairs were so extensive that Unit 1 did not come back on-line for 11 months. The natural frequency of torsional vibration was 120 Hz, approximately twice that of the electrical frequency, so the resulting resonant vibration led to blade failure.

=== 1988 ===
On 24 September 1988, one control rod assembly was found to be not fully inserted following a reactor trip at Unit 1. Subsequent rod drop tests showed the rod assembly stuck at or above the same not-fully-inserted position, leading to removal and examination of the rod assembly. The examination showed several rods were cracked, which were later determined to result from volumetric growth of the hafnium neutron absorber and differential thermal expansion (hafnium compared to the stainless steel rod cladding). Taipower later replaced all hafnium-containing rods with a different alloy to resolve the issue.

=== 2001 ===
Unit 1 suffered a station blackout on 18 March 2001 when grid instability caused a loss of offsite power and both of the emergency diesel generator trains failed to start. Both units had tripped off-line the prior day due to instability in the 345 kV offsite power transmission line, caused by salt-bearing seasonal sea smog. The 4.16 kV essential bus was transferred to the 161 kV offsite power line, but the 161 kV line was lost soon afterwards. The "A" train emergency diesel generator started but was unable to supply power due to a bus grounding fault, and the "B" train diesel generator lost power to its exciter, resulting in a loss of power to both 4.16 kV essential busses. Service to these busses was not restored for over two hours, when a swing diesel generator (shared between Units 1 and 2) was brought to service.

At the time, this was considered the most notable event in the history of nuclear generation in Taiwan. Neither unit was allowed to restart until the root causes were identified and corrective actions applied, as the same conditions could have occurred at Unit 2.

=== 2005 ===
During normal full operation of the power plant on 29 January 2005, Unit 2 reactor scram was initiated followed by a main turbine trip. A universal logic card in the plant's solid-state protection system malfunctioned, erroneously reporting a low-low water level condition in the steam generators. This then caused the actuation of the auxiliary feed water system and reactor protection system.

Unit 1 was operating at full power on 25 March 2005 when the reactor tripped on low-low water level in steam generator C. Prior to the trip, the high water level alarm in steam generator C was triggered when the water level kept rising and the main feedwater control valve did not respond to manual intervention. When control of the valve was switched to a backup system, the valve closed immediately, leading to a low-low water level condition in the steam generator before the valve could be re-opened. It was later determined the primary valve positioner had a loose mechanical connection, resulting in erroneous feedback of valve position.

While operating at reduced power in anticipation of typhoon Talim, on 1 September 2005, the Unit 2 main transformer differential protective relay tripped because a damaged support insulator caused one phase to flash to ground. The main transformer trip was followed by main turbine trip and then reactor scram. Following the subsequent repair work, on 8 September 2005, as the unit was in a hot standby condition, a water hammer occurred in one of the main steam lines. It was determined that condensed water accumulated while the unit was in warm standby with the drain valve closed. When that steam line started to supply steam to the turbine, the slug of water was pushed downstream, causing a water hammer and subsequent low steam pressure, resulting in another reactor trip.

=== 2006 ===
Maanshan Nuclear Power Plant was affected by the Hengchun earthquake on 26 December 2006. Because of the vigorous vibration, the alarm at Reactor #2 was activated, forcing the operators to carry out SCRAM immediately. However, Reactor #1 was not affected and remained operational. After the emergency shutdown of Reactor #2, engineers checked the facilities at the plant and no problems were found.

=== 2009 ===
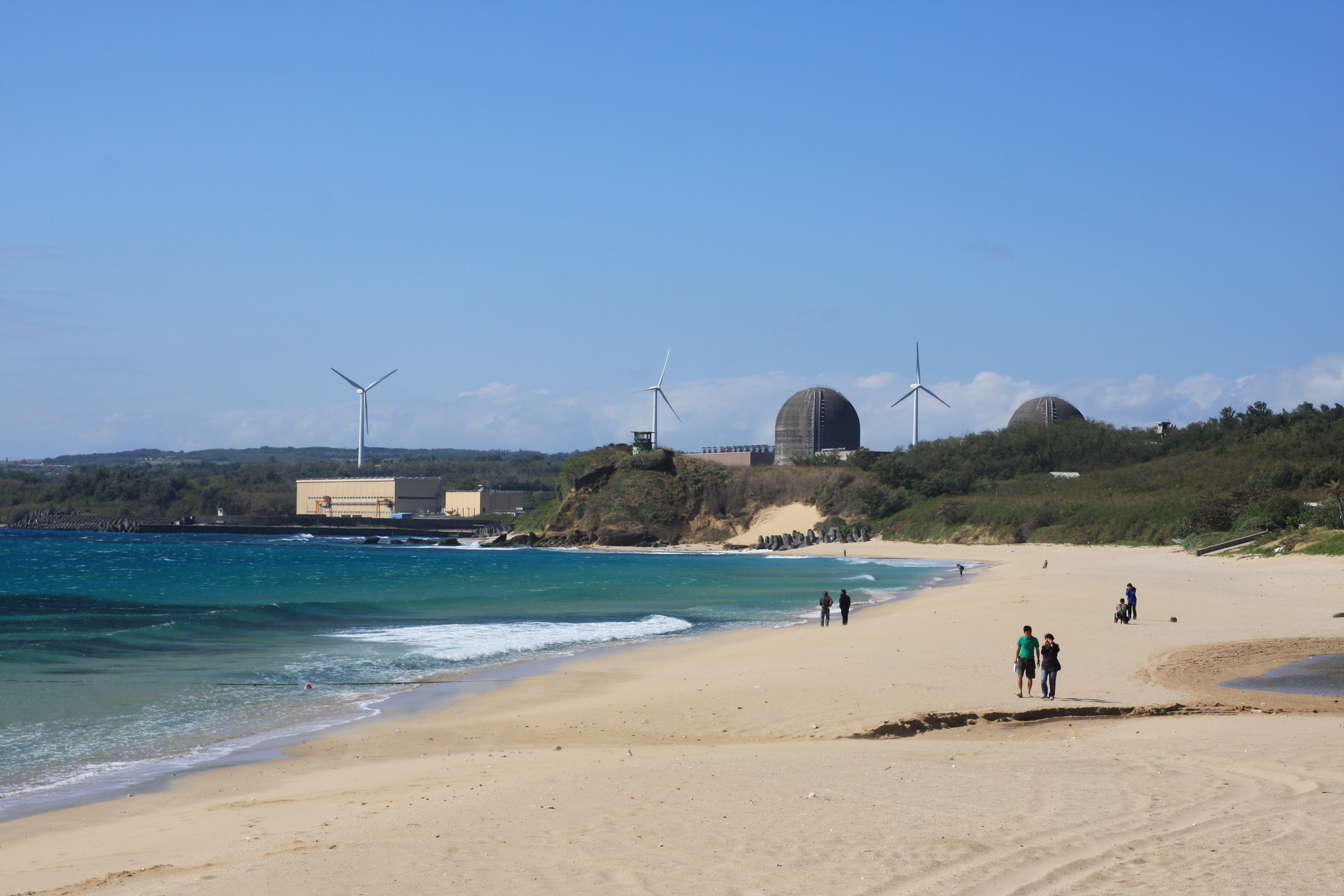
The plant can be seen from the beach at nearby Kenting town

On 12 June 2009 one of the 345 kV startup transformers (which supply station power during refueling outages and reactor startup, and supply backup power to safety-related systems during plant operation) caught fire. Water intrusion into the "B" phase bushing caused an internal arc after high internal oil pressure caused an access handhole to blow out. Since there was a separate and redundant transformer in place, plant operation was not threatened during the 35 minutes it took to extinguish the fire.

=== 2010 ===
The Unit 3 of the power plant was shut down on 16 November 2010 to undergo the EOC-19 outage after running in full cycle continuously, safely and stably for 539 days.

=== 2015 ===
One reactor of the plant was shut down on 27 April 2015 after its auxiliary step-down transformer caught on fire.

One reactor of the plant was shut down to undergo an overhaul from 9 November 2015 to 7 December 2015 to replace fuel rods and maintain electrical equipment. The overhaul also included expanding the DC battery capacity for supplying emergency power for safety equipment from 8 hours to 24 hours.

=== 2017 ===
A plant cooling water pump experienced malfunction on 24 January 2017 causing the shutdown of the plant reactor. A safe half mechanism was activated after the trip.

On 23 July 2017, the second nuclear reactor coolant system of the plant failed and electricity generation was interrupted at 1:10 a.m. The damage was resolved the next day.

=== 2025 ===
On 13 May 2025, the Legislative Yuan passed a bill permitting nuclear power plant operators to apply for a 20-year license renewal of active power plants. However, President Lai Ching-te stated that the No. 2 reactor at the Maanshan Nuclear Power Plant was to be shut down as scheduled, as it could not be restarted without undergoing a substantial review process. Maanshan's second reactor was fully disconnected on 17 May 2025. A referendum on restarting Maanshan was out to voters after being approved by the Legislative Yuan on 20 May 2025. The referendum was defeated on 23 August 2025, as the number of votes in favor of the motion fell short of the threshold of a quarter of the eligible voters.

=== 2026 ===
On 24 September 2026, the Taiwan Nuclear Safety Commission approved a preliminary plan for the restart of both units at Maanshan, despite the failed 2025 referendum. That said, the commission added that Taiwan Power Co will have to carry out further inspections of the plant before submitting another report on implementation for review to the Nuclear Safety Commission. Placed on the backdrop of unstable fossil fuel prices regarding the 2026 conflict in the Middle East, AI driven tech energy damands, the recent restarting of nuclear power stations elsewhere, and the 2025 revision by the Legislative Yuan of the Nuclear Reactor Facilities Regulation Act to allow nuclear stations to renew or extend their licences beyond the 40 year maximum, the regulatory greenlight marks a reversal of the Democratic Progressive Party's anti nuclear "nuclear-free homeland". Restart of the Maanshan Nuclear Power Plant is targeted for 2028 by Minister of Economic Affairs Kung Ming-hsin as of September 2026.

== See also ==
- Energy in Taiwan
- List of power stations in Taiwan
- Nuclear power in Taiwan
- Electricity sector in Taiwan
