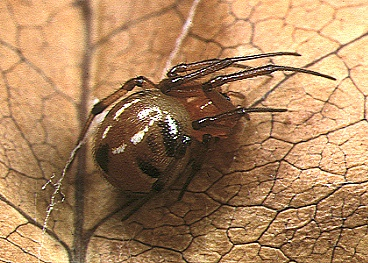
- Female from Okinawa
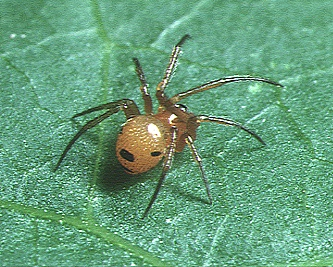
- Male from Okinawa

Scientific classification
- Kingdom: Animalia
- Phylum: Arthropoda
- Subphylum: Chelicerata
- Class: Arachnida
- Order: Araneae
- Infraorder: Araneomorphae
- Family: Theridiidae
- Genus: Nihonhimea
- Species: N. japonica

Binomial name
- Nihonhimea japonica (Bösenberg & Strand, 1906)

Synonyms
- Theridion japonicum Bösenberg & Strand, 1906; Achaearanea japonica (Bösenberg & Strand, 1906); Parasteatoda japonica (Bösenberg & Strand, 1906); Parasteatoda ungilensis Kim & Kim, 1996

= Nihonhimea japonica =

Species of spider

Nihonhimea japonica is a species of spider in the family Theridiidae (cobweb spiders). Originally described from Japan, it has since been found across East Asia, including Korea, China, Taiwan, and Laos.

== Taxonomy ==
The species was first described by Friedrich Wilhelm Bösenberg and Embrik Strand in 1906 as Theridion japonicum based on specimens collected from the Yunohama mountains near Saga, Japan. The specific name japonicum refers to its type locality in Japan.

The species has undergone several taxonomic revisions. It was transferred to the genus Achaearanea by Yoshida in 1983, then to Parasteatoda by Yoshida in 2008, and finally to the genus Nihonhimea by Yoshida in 2016. The species is the type species of the genus Nihonhimea.

== Distribution ==
Nihonhimea japonica is widely distributed across East Asia. It has been recorded from Japan, Korea, China, Taiwan, and Laos.

== Description ==
Nihonhimea japonica is a small theridiid spider with notable sexual dimorphism. Females are larger than males, measuring 3.5–5 mm in body length, while males are 2.5 mm.

The female cephalothorax is light brown with some darker brown markings extending from the head region to a depression in the center, from which two lines continue over the posterior part of the cephalothorax. The anterior median eyes are slightly larger than the other eyes and appear blackish, while the remaining eyes appear bright whitish-yellow. The eyes are arranged on a common protruding elevation. The sternum is yellow with brown chelicerae. The yellow maxillae are long, narrow, and somewhat converging at the tips. The brown labium, edged and rounded with yellow, is considerably wider than long.

The pedipalps are quite robust, with the last two segments considerably thicker than the leg tarsi. The legs are brownish-yellow, with some darker coloration on the tips of segments, particularly the fourth tibia and third metatarsus showing black markings.

The female opisthosoma is brownish-gray or yellowish-brown with a characteristic pattern consisting of three bright white, crescent-shaped arcs, each containing a black, round spot. The lower white arc is shorter than the lateral ones and extends posteriorly in a wedge shape. In older individuals, two additional white longitudinal stripes may appear running toward the posterior, leaving space at the base between the spots. The triangular anal region is pure white. The abdomen is brownish-yellow with the central area slightly lighter than the sides, featuring a large dark brown spot in the center.

Males are generally darker in coloration, particularly the cephalothorax and legs. The abdominal pattern differs from females, with only the two middle spots present, while the posterior triangular spot found in all females is absent. The white crescent-shaped markings are also absent.
