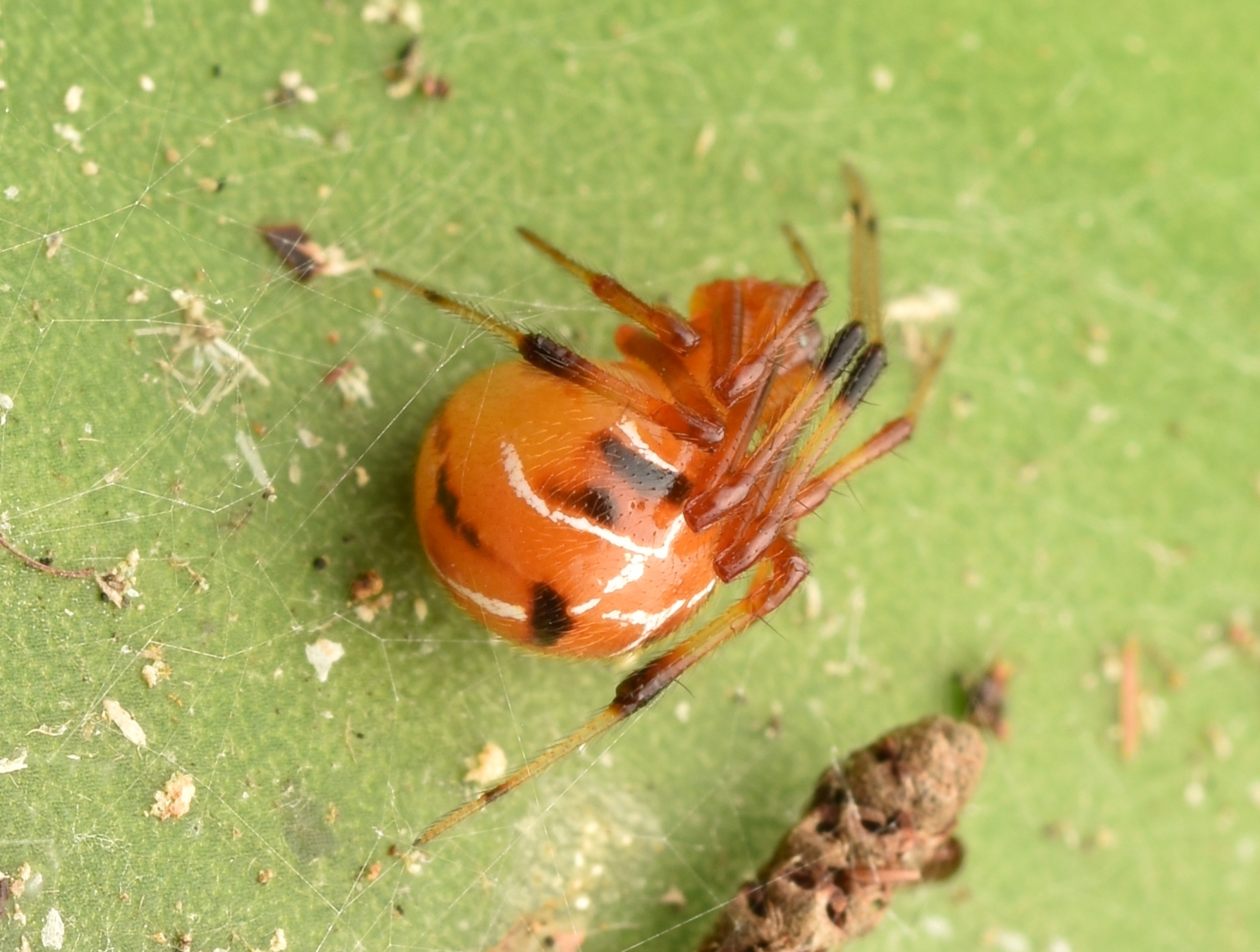
- Female from Costa Rica

Scientific classification
- Kingdom: Animalia
- Phylum: Arthropoda
- Subphylum: Chelicerata
- Class: Arachnida
- Order: Araneae
- Infraorder: Araneomorphae
- Family: Theridiidae
- Genus: Nihonhimea
- Species: N. tesselata

Binomial name
- Nihonhimea tesselata (Keyserling, 1884)

Synonyms
- Theridion tesselatum Keyserling, 1884; Theridion picadoi Banks, 1909; Achaearanea tesselata (Keyserling, 1884); Achaearanea picadoi (Banks, 1909); Achaearanea terex Levi, 1959; Parasteatoda tesselata (Keyserling, 1884)

= Nihonhimea tesselata =

Species of spider

Nihonhimea tesselata is a species of spider in the family Theridiidae. Originally described as Theridion tesselatum by Eugen von Keyserling in 1884, the species has undergone several taxonomic transfers before being assigned to the genus Nihonhimea by Yoshida in 2016.

== Taxonomy ==
The species was originally described by Keyserling in 1884 as Theridion tesselatum based on a female specimen from Peru. The specific epithet "tesselata" (originally "tesselatum") refers to the tessellated or checkered pattern on the spider's opisthosoma.

Banks described Theridion picadoi in 1909, and Levi described Achaearanea terex in 1959, both of which were later synonymized with this species. Levi transferred the species to Achaearanea in 1959 and synonymized A. picadoi and A. terex with A. tesselata in 1963.

The species was later transferred to Parasteatoda by Yoshida in 2008 and finally to the newly established genus Nihonhimea by Yoshida in 2016.

== Distribution ==
N. tesselata has a wide distribution range, naturally occurring from Mexico to Paraguay in the Americas. The species has also been introduced to several regions including Pakistan, New Guinea, and Australia (Queensland).

== Habitat ==
N. tesselata builds aerial cobwebs and has been found in various habitats including Eucalyptus plantations. The species typically constructs its webs in the distal portions of tree branches, which allows for effective capture of flying insects.

== Description ==
Based on Keyserling's original description and Levi's redescription, female N. tesselata measure approximately 3.7 mm in total length. The cephalothorax is approximately 1.4 mm long and 1.2 mm wide at its center, with the front portion being about 0.5 mm wide. The opisthosoma measures about 2.6 mm long and 2.0 mm wide.

The cephalothorax is reddish-yellow with brownish sides extending far up, and the mouthparts are also reddish-yellow. The sternum is light yellow with a black longitudinal stripe that is not completely continuous in the middle. The legs are yellow, with the femora brown in front and behind, particularly those of the front two pairs, and all segments ending with black rings.

The opisthosoma displays the characteristic tessellated pattern that gives the species its name. It has a yellowish background with three narrow light cross-bands interrupted by a broad longitudinal band on each side. Between these light cross-bands lies a yellow, wavy-bordered pattern containing a small dark brown spot at the back.

Like many theridiid spiders, this species exhibits sexual dimorphism, with males being smaller than females. Males of the synonym A. terex were described as having a total length of 1.3 mm and distinctive palpal structures.

== Behavior and ecology ==
N. tesselata is a web-building spider that constructs three-dimensional cobwebs consisting of both sheet and tangle portions. These webs contain viscid globules that are very small and water-soluble, present in both the sheet and tangle portions.

The spider's prey attack behavior involves a three-step sequence: descending from the suspended retreat, passing through the sheet threads, and wrapping the prey from underneath the sheet. Attacks can occur as quickly as 0.11 seconds after the spider begins its descent.
