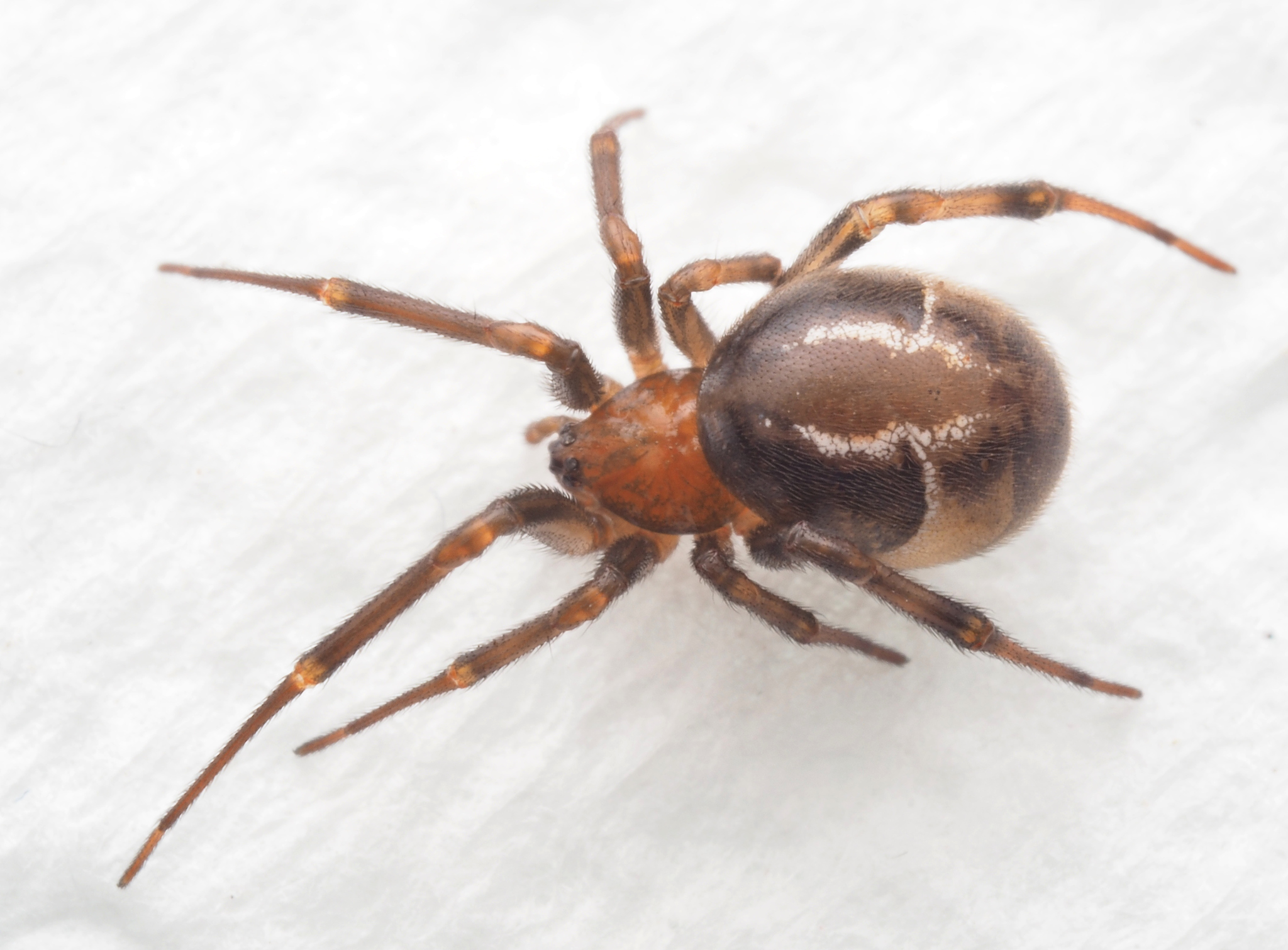
- female from Australia

Scientific classification
- Kingdom: Animalia
- Phylum: Arthropoda
- Subphylum: Chelicerata
- Class: Arachnida
- Order: Araneae
- Infraorder: Araneomorphae
- Family: Theridiidae
- Genus: Nihonhimea
- Species: N. mundula

Binomial name
- Nihonhimea mundula (L. Koch, 1872)

Synonyms
- Theridion mundulum L. Koch, 1872; Theridion amoenum Thorell, 1877; Achaearanea mundula (L. Koch, 1872); Parasteatoda mundula (L. Koch, 1872)

= Nihonhimea mundula =

Comb-footed platform spider

Species of spider

Nihonhimea mundula is a species of cobweb spider in the family Theridiidae. It was originally described by Ludwig Carl Christian Koch in 1872 as Theridion mundulum. The species is commonly known as the comb-footed platform spider or rolled-leaf comb-footed spider.

== Taxonomy ==
N. mundula has undergone several taxonomic revisions since its original description. Koch originally described it as Theridion mundulum in 1872 from Australian specimens. Thorell described Theridion amoenum in 1877, which was later synonymized with T. mundulum by Thorell himself in 1895.

The species was subsequently transferred to Achaearanea by Chrysanthus in 1963, then to Parasteatoda by Saaristo in 2006, and finally to the newly established genus Nihonhimea by Yoshida in 2016.

== Distribution ==
N. mundula has a wide distribution across the Indo-Pacific region. It has been recorded from the Seychelles, India, Sri Lanka, Malaysia, Indonesia, Australia (particularly northern regions including Western Australia, Northern Territory, and Queensland), Papua New Guinea, and New Caledonia.

== Habitat ==
The species constructs distinctive platform webs consisting of a horizontal, close-meshed silk sheet suspended above a network of threads. The spider typically creates a retreat at the center of this web, often utilizing curled leaves or loosely silked leaf detritus.

== Description ==
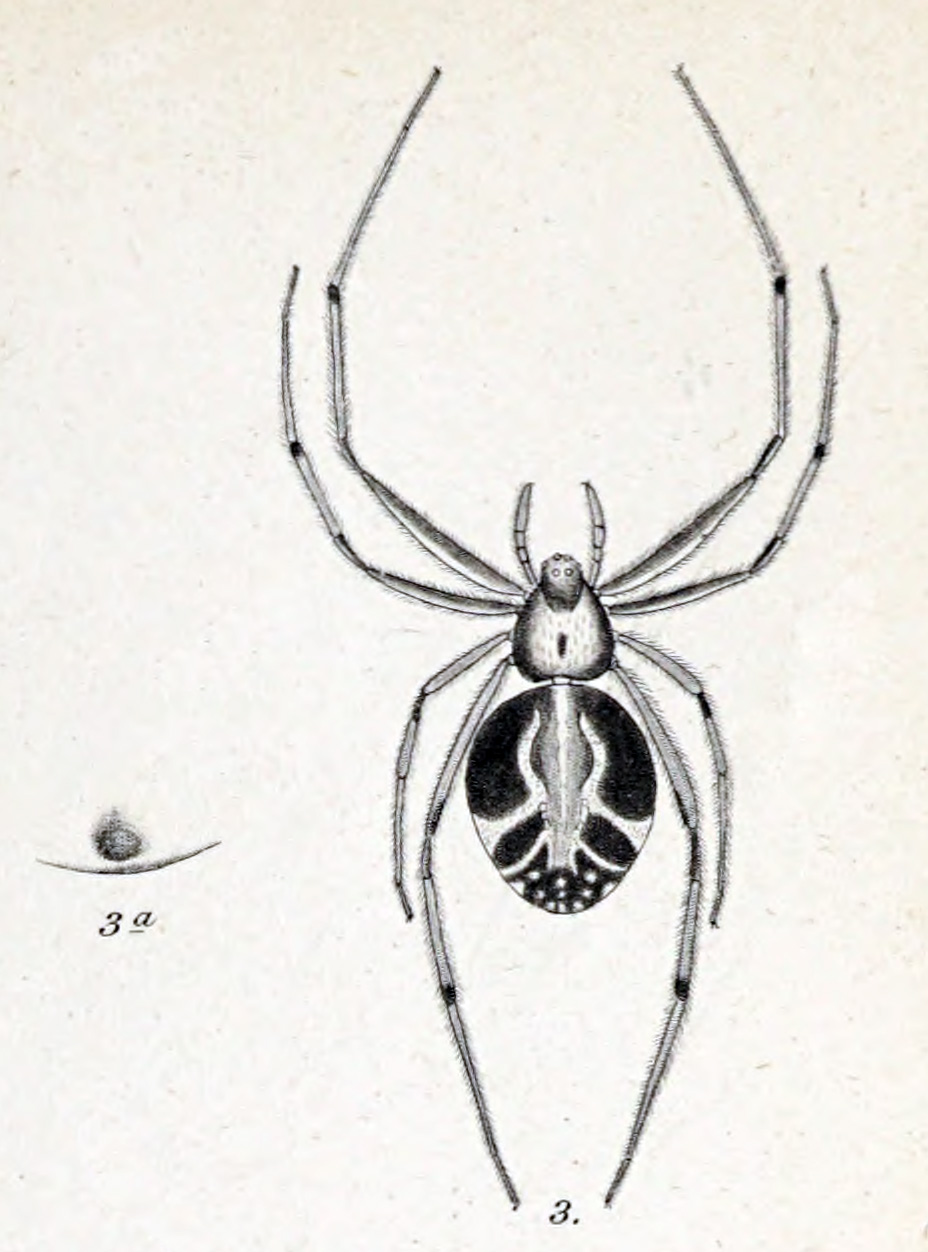
female from original description by L. Koch

N. mundula exhibits typical theridiid characteristics with a globular opisthosoma and relatively long legs. Based on historical descriptions, females have a brownish-yellow cephalothorax that is darker on the sides, with yellowish-brown chelicerae, maxillae, and labium. The sternum is also yellowish-brown but lighter colored toward the labium.

The pedipalps are brownish-yellow, while the legs are brownish-yellow with the femora slightly blackish. The tibiae have brown joint tips, and the metatarsi and tarsi are somewhat darker. The opisthosoma is black above, transitioning to brown posteriorly, with yellowish spotting. The underside is brownish-yellow with a black central area.

The species demonstrates sexual dimorphism, with males being smaller than females. Historical measurements from Hogg (1919) recorded a male specimen with a cephalothorax length of 2 mm and width of 1 mm, an opisthosoma length of 2 mm and width of 1.5 mm.

== Behavior and ecology ==
N. mundula is a specialist predator that primarily feeds on other spiders, including web-building spiders and jumping spiders, as well as their eggs.

The platform web functions as an effective hunting mechanism. When insects or other prey fly into the network of threads above the platform, they fall onto the silk sheet below, where the spider quickly captures them from its retreat.

The webs also serve as microhabitats for various other organisms, including small moth larvae that scavenge along the silk lines and other spiders that venture into the outer parts of the web seeking prey. Some of these include prey-stealing spiders of the genus Argyrodes, including Argyrodes incursus, which is a specialist predator of N. mundula.
