= Parasteatoda quadrimaculata =

Scientific classification
- Kingdom: Animalia
- Phylum: Arthropoda
- Subphylum: Chelicerata
- Class: Arachnida
- Order: Araneae
- Infraorder: Araneomorphae
- Family: Theridiidae
- Genus: Parasteatoda
- Species: P. quadrimaculata

Binomial name
- Parasteatoda quadrimaculata (Yoshida, Tso & Severinghaus, 2000)
- Parasteatoda quadrimaculata is known from Orchid Island (circle) and Kenting (triangle), Taiwan

Synonyms
- Achaearanea quadrimaculata Yoshida, Tso & Severinghaus, 2000

Species of spider

Parasteatoda quadrimaculata is a species of comb-footed spider in the family Theridiidae. It is endemic to Taiwan. The type series – two females – was collected from Orchid Island, while one more female was found in Kenting in southern Taiwan.

Female Parasteatoda quadrimaculata measure 3.16–3.53 mm (0.12–0.14 in) in total length; males are unknown. The carapace is yellowish brown with dark eye region. The abdomen is dorsally blackish brown with four white spots and ventrally yellowish white. The chelicerae, maxillae, and labium are brown. The sternum is yellowish brown.
