= Parasteatoda lanyuensis =

Scientific classification
- Kingdom: Animalia
- Phylum: Arthropoda
- Subphylum: Chelicerata
- Class: Arachnida
- Order: Araneae
- Infraorder: Araneomorphae
- Family: Theridiidae
- Genus: Parasteatoda
- Species: P. lanyuensis

Binomial name
- Parasteatoda lanyuensis (Yoshida, Tso & Severinghaus, 2000)
- Parasteatoda lanyuensis is known from Orchid Island, Taiwan

Synonyms
- Achaearanea lanyuensis Yoshida, Tso & Severinghaus, 2000

Species of spider

Parasteatoda lanyuensis is a species of comb-footed spider in the family Theridiidae. It is endemic to Taiwan. The type series – two males and three females – was collected from Orchid Island (=Lanyu in Chinese, hence the specific name).

Male Parasteatoda lanyuensis measure 2.68–3.11 mm (0.11–0.12 in) and females 5.47–5.51 mm (0.22–0.22 in) in total length. The carapace is brown with dusky spots while the abdomen is grayish dusky brown with white spots and black flecks. The chelicerae, maxillae, and labium are brown. The sternum is light brown with posterior black flecks. The legs are light brown.
