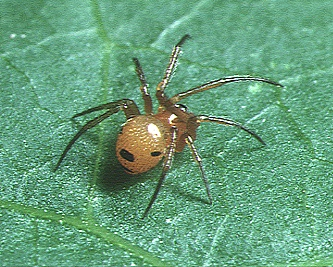
- Nihonhimea japonica
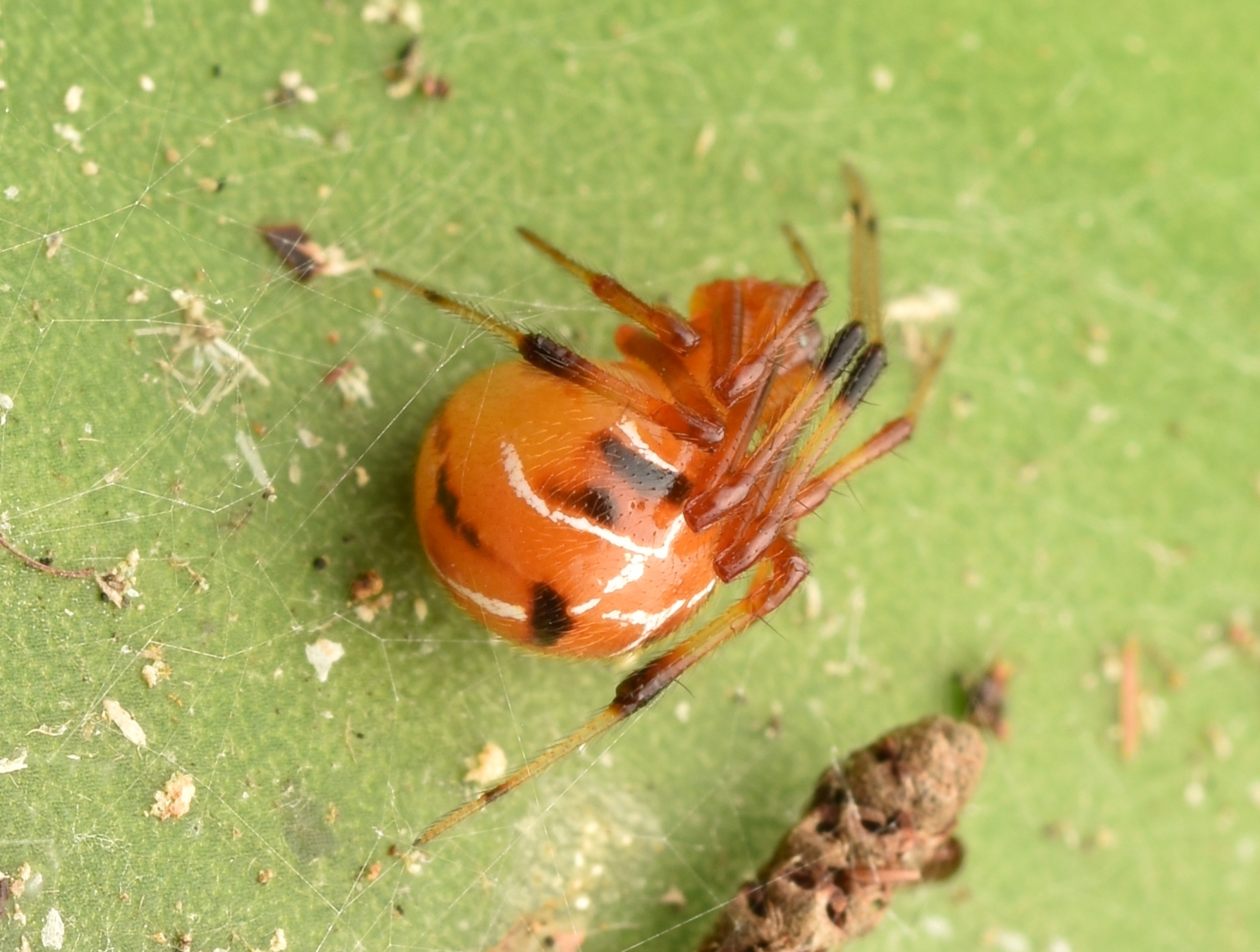
- N. tesselata

Scientific classification
- Kingdom: Animalia
- Phylum: Arthropoda
- Subphylum: Chelicerata
- Class: Arachnida
- Order: Araneae
- Infraorder: Araneomorphae
- Family: Theridiidae
- Genus: Nihonhimea; Yoshida, 2016

Type species
- Nihonhimea japonica (Bösenberg & Strand, 1906)

Species
- Nihonhimea brookesiana (Barrion & Litsinger, 1995) – India, Philippines; Nihonhimea indica (Tikader, 1977) – India; Nihonhimea japonica (Bösenberg & Strand, 1906) – Japan, Korea, China, Taiwan, Laos; Nihonhimea mundula (L. Koch, 1872) – Seychelles, India to New Caledonia; Nihonhimea tesselata (Keyserling, 1884) – Mexico to Paraguay; introduced to Pakistan, New Guinea, Australia (Queensland); Nihonhimea tikaderi (Patel, 1973) – India

= Nihonhimea =

Comb-footed Platform Spiders

Genus of spiders

Nihonhimea is a genus of spiders in the family Theridiidae. It was first described in 2016 by Yoshida.

The genus name is a combination of Japanese 日本 nihon "Japan", and "-himea", possible from Japanese 姫 hime "princess".

As of 2025, the genus contains six species distributed across Asia, with some species extending to the Pacific islands and the Americas. Several species have complex taxonomic histories, with multiple synonyms and transfers between genera including Theridion, Achaearanea, and Parasteatoda.

== Taxonomy ==
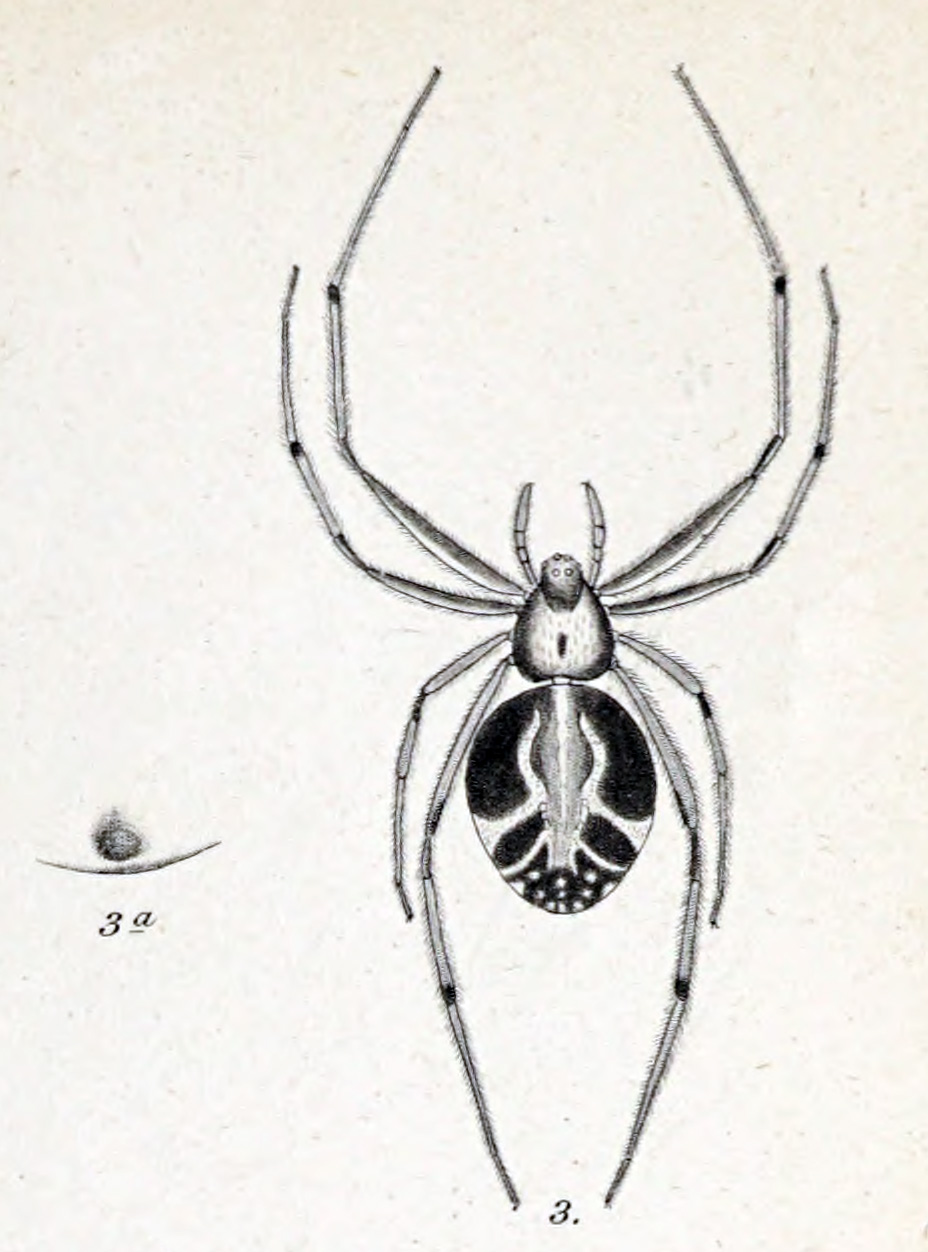
female N. mundula from original description by L. Koch

The genus was established by Yoshida in 2016 to accommodate several species previously placed in Parasteatoda and related genera. The type species, N. japonica, was originally described as Theridion japonicum by Bösenberg & Strand in 1906.

Several species have been synonymized over time, including N. mundula papuana (Chrysanthus, 1963), which is now considered a synonym of N. mundula, and N. ungilensis (Kim & Kim, 1996), which is synonymized with N. japonica.

== Distribution ==
The genus has a primarily Asian distribution, with species found from India and the Seychelles eastward to Japan, Korea, and the Pacific islands. N. tesselata has the most extensive range, naturally occurring from Mexico to Paraguay in the Americas, and has been introduced to Pakistan, New Guinea, and Queensland, Australia.
