= List of volcanoes in Taiwan =

This is a list of active and extinct volcanoes.

Name	Elevation		Location	Last eruption
Name	meters	feet	Coordinates	Last eruption
Tatun Volcanic Group	1120	3675	25°11′N 121°33′E	648 CE
Chilung Volcanic Group	588	1929		-
Guanyin Mountain	616	2021	25°08′N 121°26′E	-
Caoling Mountain				-
Guishan Island	398	1306	24°51′N 121°57′E	1775-1795 CE
Coast Mountains	1680	5510		-
Green Island	281	922	22°40′N 121°29′E	-
Orchid Island	552	1811	22°03′N 121°32′E	-
Penghu			23°35′N 119°35′E	-

== See also ==
- List of mountains in Taiwan
- Geography of Taiwan
- Geology of Taiwan
