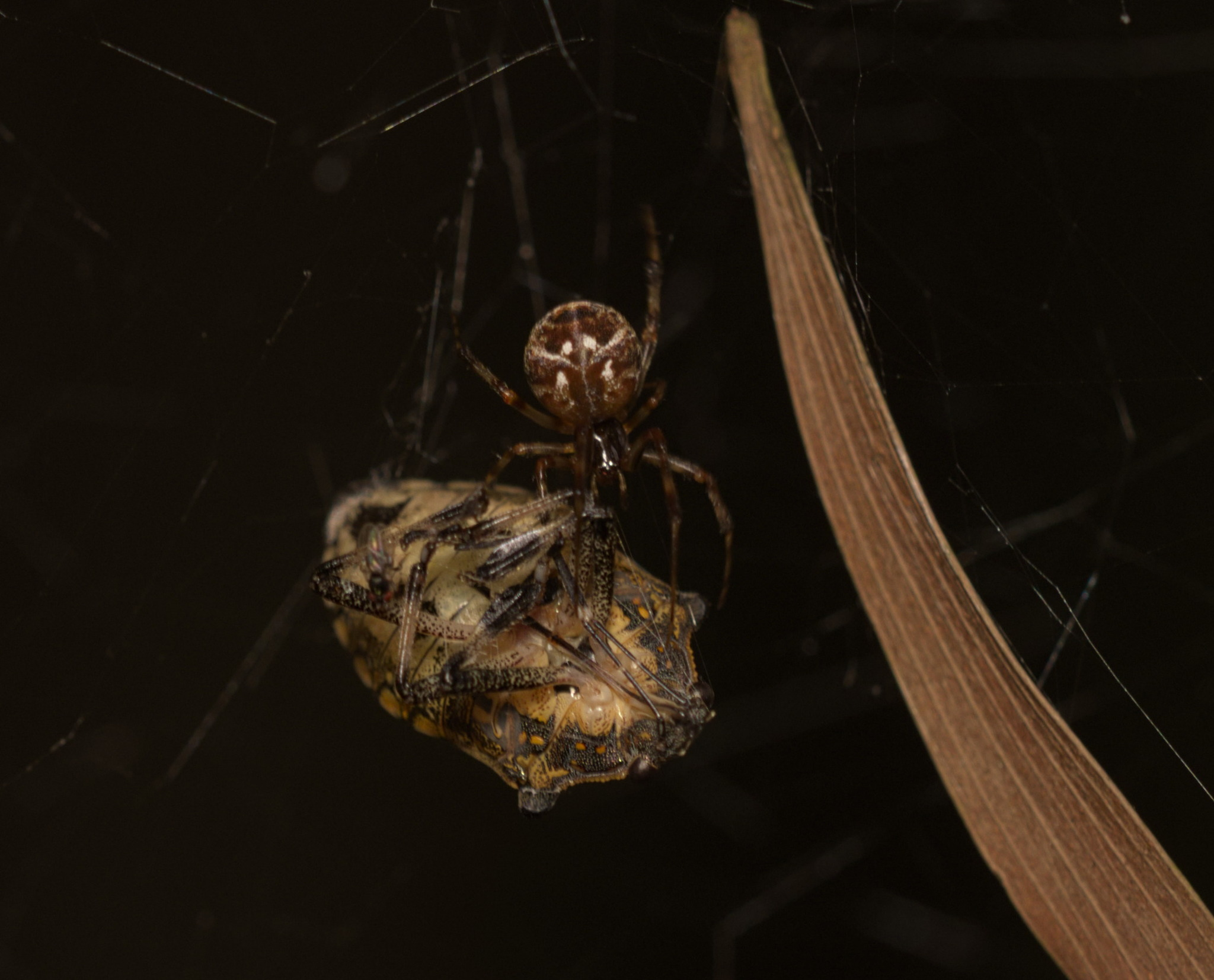
- female from Hong Kong

Scientific classification
- Kingdom: Animalia
- Phylum: Arthropoda
- Subphylum: Chelicerata
- Class: Arachnida
- Order: Araneae
- Infraorder: Araneomorphae
- Family: Theridiidae
- Genus: Parasteatoda
- Species: P. songi

Binomial name
- Parasteatoda songi (Zhu, 1998)

Synonyms
- Achaearanea songi Zhu, 1998

= Parasteatoda songi =

Species of spider

Parasteatoda songi is a species of cobweb spider in the family Theridiidae. It is found in China.

The species is named after Song Daxiang (宋大祥), a prominent Chinese arachnologist.

== Taxonomy ==
The species was originally described as Achaearanea songi by Zhu in 1998. It was later transferred to the genus Parasteatoda by Yoshida in 2008.

== Distribution ==
P. songi has been recorded from several provinces in China, including Hunan and Hubei.

== Description ==
The female has a body length of 3.80–4.01 mm, with the cephalothorax measuring 1.30 mm wide and 1.20 mm long, and the abdomen measuring 2.60 mm wide and 2.30 mm long. The male is smaller, with a body length of 2.60–2.80 mm.

The cephalothorax is brownish-yellow with a distinctive V-shaped dark brown marking in the posterior central area. The abdomen has a spherical appearance when viewed dorsally and is laterally flattened when viewed from the side. The dorsal surface is raised posteriorly and features a small hill-like projection with yellow-brown coloration centrally, flanked by white and purple-brown diagonal stripes.
