= Lanyu Power Plant =

Power plant in Lanyu, Taitung County, Taiwan

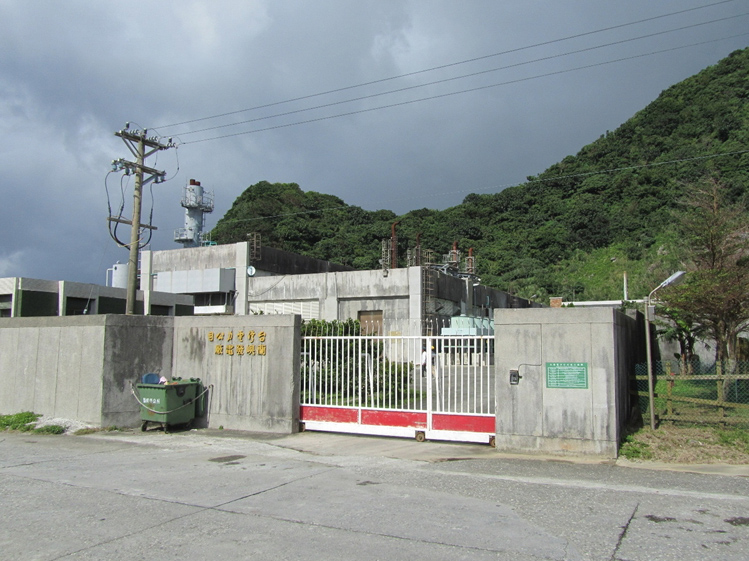
- Official name: 蘭嶼發電廠
- Country: Taiwan
- Location: Yuren Village, Orchid Island, Taitung County
- Coordinates: 22°1′33.4″N 121°32′23.9″E
- Status: Operational
- Commission date: July 1982 (Unit 1-2); October 1993 (Unit 3-4)
- Owner: Taipower
- Operator: Taipower

Thermal power station
- Primary fuel: Diesel fuel

Power generation
- Units operational: 6

External links
- Commons: Related media on Commons

The Lanyu Power Plant (traditional Chinese: 蘭嶼發電廠; simplified Chinese: 兰屿发电厂; pinyin: Lányǔ Fādiànchǎng) is a fuel-fired power plant in Yuren Village, Orchid Island, Taitung County, Taiwan. It is the only power plant on Orchid Island.

== Technical specification ==
The power plant uses 15,000 liter of diesel fuel daily to generate electricity. It has two units of 750,000 liter diesel storage tanks.

== See also ==
- List of power stations in Taiwan
- Electricity sector in Taiwan
