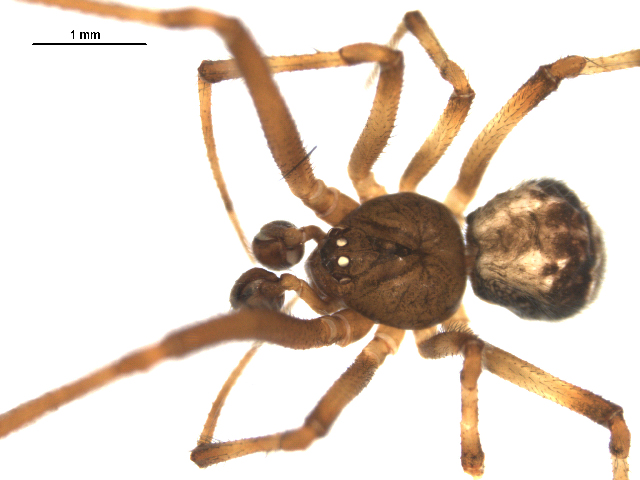
- P. tabulata, male
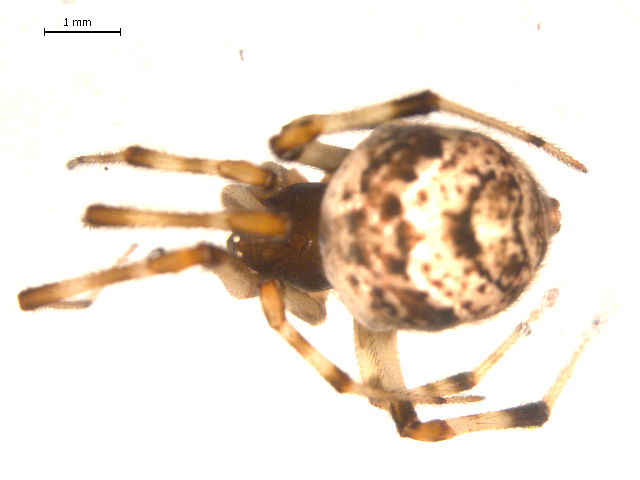
- P. tabulata, female

Scientific classification
- Domain: Eukaryota
- Kingdom: Animalia
- Phylum: Arthropoda
- Subphylum: Chelicerata
- Class: Arachnida
- Order: Araneae
- Infraorder: Araneomorphae
- Family: Theridiidae
- Genus: Parasteatoda
- Species: P. tabulata

Binomial name
- Parasteatoda tabulata (Levi, 1980)

Synonyms
- Achaearanea nipponica; Achaearanea tabulata; Parasteatoda nipponica

= Parasteatoda tabulata =

Species of spider

Parasteatoda tabulata is a cobweb spider first described by female found by H. W. Levi in 1980. It originates from tropical Asia, but has been introduced to North America, Europe, and temperate Asia including China, Korea, and Japan.
