= Keijiella =

Scientific classification
- Kingdom: Animalia
- Phylum: Arthropoda
- Subphylum: Chelicerata
- Class: Arachnida
- Order: Araneae
- Infraorder: Araneomorphae
- Family: Theridiidae
- Genus: Keijiella; Yoshida, 2016
- Species: K. oculiprominens

Binomial name
- Keijiella oculiprominens (Saito, 1939)

Genus of spiders

Keijiella is a genus of spiders in the family Theridiidae. It was first described in 2016 by Yoshida. As of 2017, it contains only one species, Keijiella oculiprominens, found in China, Taiwan, Laos, Korea, and Japan.
