= Orchid Island =

Volcanic island off the southeastern coast of Taiwan

Native name: Pongso no Tao
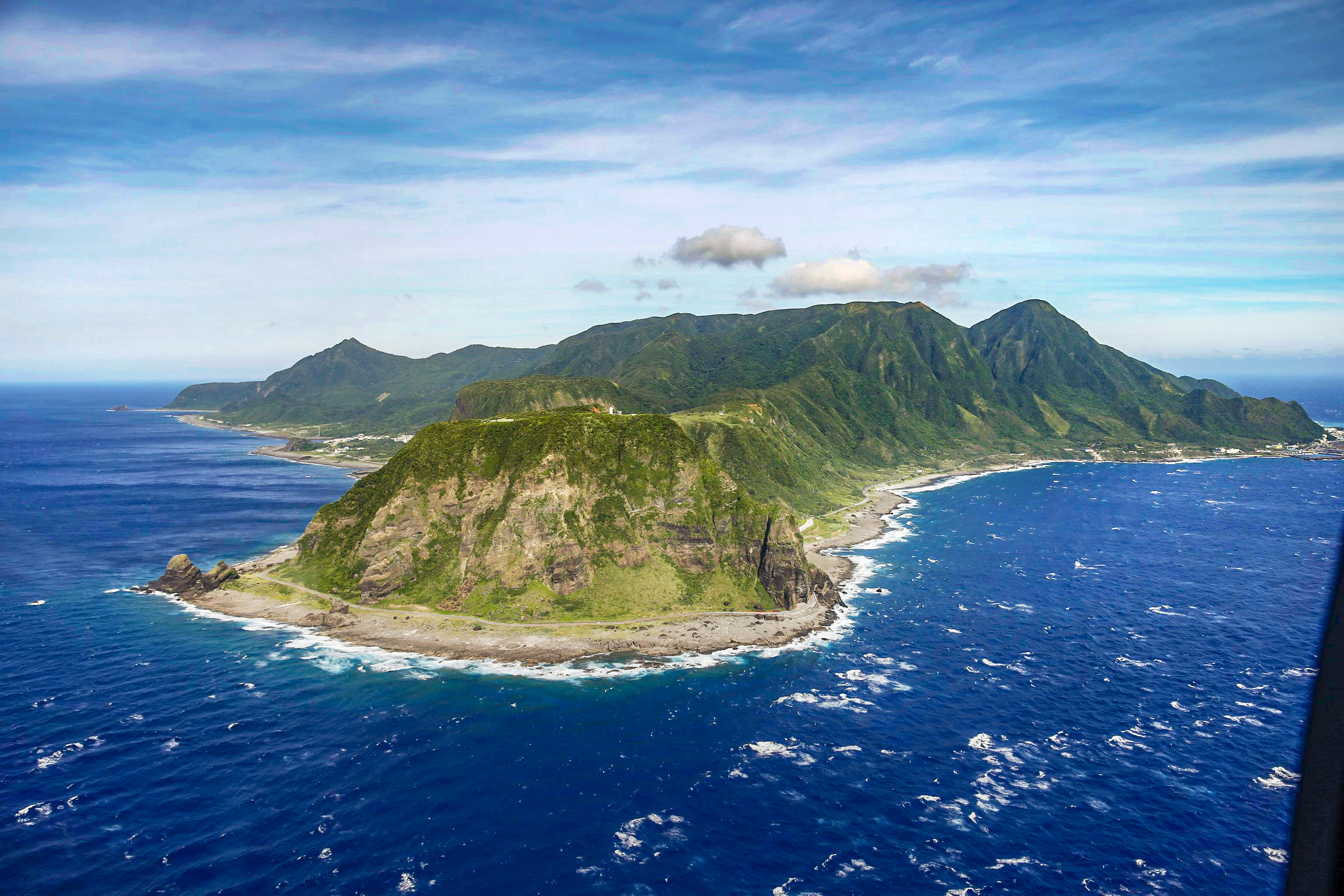
- Aerial view of Orchid Island

- Locator map showing Orchid Island alongside Lesser Orchid and Green Islands

Geography
- Location: Philippine Sea
- Area: 45 km^{2} (17 sq mi)
- Highest elevation: 552 m (1811 ft)
- Highest point: Mount Hongtou

Administration
- Republic of China (Taiwan)
- County: Taitung
- Township: Lanyu

Demographics
- Population: 5,255 (February 2023)
- Ethnic groups: Tao, Han

Orchid Island
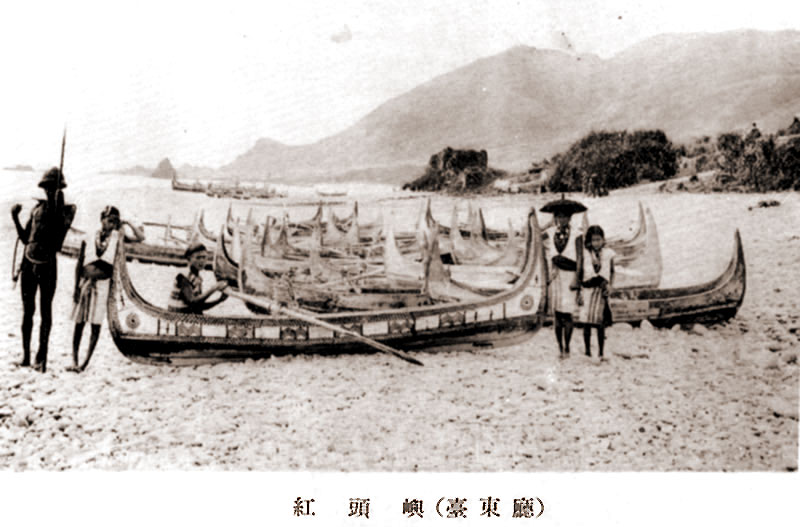
- The shore of Orchid Island from an imperial Japanese publication (c. 1931)
- Traditional Chinese: 蘭嶼
- Literal meaning: Orchid Islet(s)
Transcriptions
Standard Mandarin
- Hanyu Pinyin: Lányǔ; Lán Yǔ
- Bopomofo: ㄌㄢˊ ㄩˇ
- Wade–Giles: Lan^{2}-yü^{3}; Lan^{2} Yü^{3}
- Tongyong Pinyin: Lán-yǔ; Lán Yǔ
- IPA: [lǎn.ỳ]; [lǎn ỳ]
Southern Min
- Hokkien POJ: Lân-sū; Lân Sū

Former names
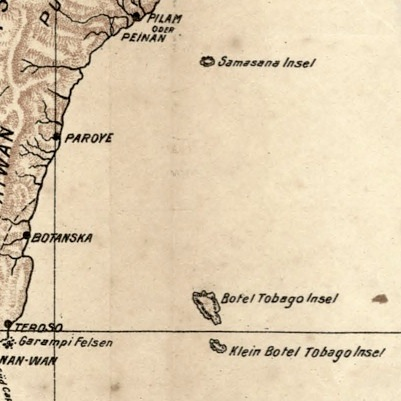
- "Botel Tobago" and "Klein Botel Tobago" on a 1905 German map

Chinese name
- Traditional Chinese: 紅頭嶼
- Literal meaning: Redhead Islet(s); Red Cape Islet(s)
Transcriptions
Standard Mandarin
- Hanyu Pinyin: Hóngtóuyǔ; Hóngtóu Yǔ
- Bopomofo: ㄏㄨㄥˊ ㄊㄡˊ ㄩˇ
- Wade–Giles: Hung^{2}-tʻou^{2}-yü^{3}; Hung^{2}-tʻou^{2} Yü^{3}
- Tongyong Pinyin: Hóng-tóu-yǔ; Hóng-tóu Yǔ
- IPA: [xʊ̌ŋ.tʰǒʊ.ỳ]; [xʊ̌ŋ.tʰǒʊ ỳ]
Southern Min
- Hokkien POJ: Âng-thâu-sū; Âng-thâu Sū

Japanese name
- Kanji: 紅頭嶼
- Hiragana: こうとうしょ
- Katakana: コウトウショ
Transcriptions
- Romanization: Kōtōsho
- Kunrei-shiki: Koutousyo

Lesser Orchid Island
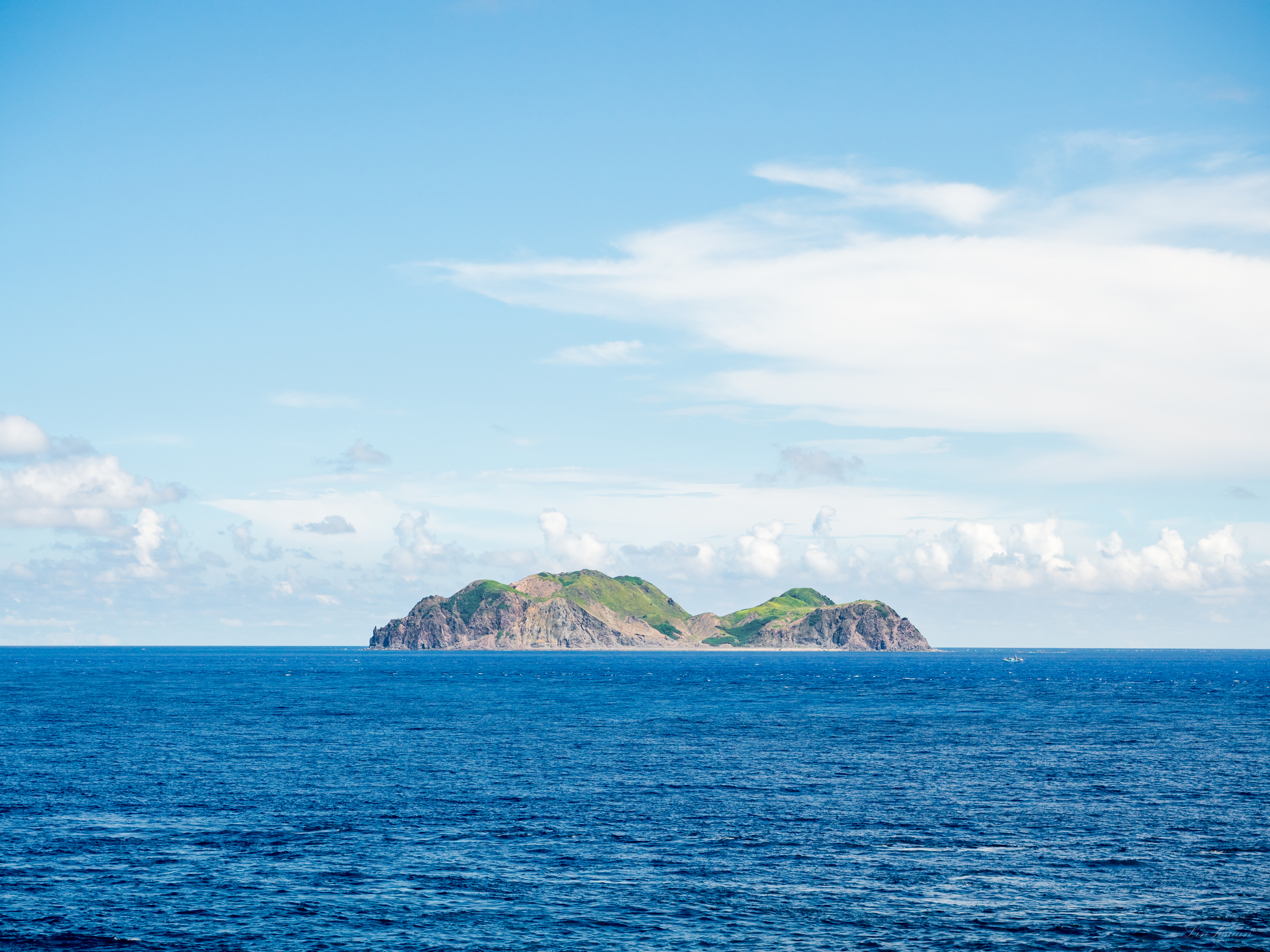
- Lesser Orchid Island
- Traditional Chinese: 小蘭嶼
- Literal meaning: Little Orchid Islet
Transcriptions
Standard Mandarin
- Hanyu Pinyin: Xiǎolányǔ; Xiǎo Lányǔ; Xiǎo Lán Yǔ
- Bopomofo: ㄒㄧㄠˇ ㄌㄢˊ ㄩˇ
- Wade–Giles: Hsiao^{3}-lan^{2}-yü^{3}; Hsiao^{3} Lan^{2}-yü^{3}; Hsiao^{3} Lan^{2} Yü^{3}
- Tongyong Pinyin: Syǎo-lán-yǔ; Syǎo Lán-yǔ; Syǎo Lán Yǔ
- IPA: [ɕjàʊ.lǎn.ỳ]; [ɕjàʊ lǎn.ỳ]; [ɕjàʊ lǎn ỳ]

Orchid Island, known as Pongso no Tao by the indigenous Tao people, is a 45 km^{2} (17 sq mi) volcanic island located off the southeastern coast of Taiwan. The island and the nearby Lesser Orchid Island are governed by Taiwan as Lanyu Township in Taitung County, which is one of the county's two insular townships (the other being Lyudao Township). It is separated from the Batanes of the Philippines by the Bashi Channel of the Luzon Strait.

It is considered a potential World Heritage Site.

== Names ==
Orchid Island is known by the Tao people indigenous to the island as Pongso no Tao ("island of human beings"). It was also known by the Tao as Ma'ataw ("floating in the sea") or Irala ("facing the mountain"); the latter being contrasted with the Tao name for the Taiwanese mainland – "Ilaod" ("toward the sea").

In the 17th century, it appeared on Japanese maps as "Tabako", a name borrowed into French and English as "Tabaco". It is still known by Filipinos as Botel Tobago, a name also formerly used in English. Lesser Orchid Island was similarly known as "Little Botel-Tobago".

"Orchid Island" is a calque of the Chinese name, written 蘭嶼 in traditional characters, although strictly the second character means an islet rather than an island. The name honors the local Phalaenopsis orchids and was established by the Republic of China government in 1947.

The island had previously been known to the Chinese as "Redhead Island" (Mandarin Chinese: 紅頭嶼; pinyin: Hóngtóuyǔ; Taiwanese Hokkien Chinese: 紅頭嶼; Pe̍h-ōe-jī: Âng-thâu-sū), referring to the island's northwestern mountain peaks, which resemble red human heads when illuminated by the setting sun. These characters were borrowed into Japanese as Kōtōsho during their rule of Taiwan.

== History ==
=== Prehistory ===
Based on genetic studies, Orchid Island was settled by the ancestors of the Tao people during the Austronesian Expansion (approximately 4000 BP). They maintained close contact through trade and intermarriage with the Ivatan people of the neighboring Batanes Islands of the Philippines until the beginning of the Colonial Era. These genetic studies are also attested by Tao oral history, which narrates that their ancestors originated from the Ivatan people of the Batanes islands.

=== Independence ===
The island first appears on surviving charts in the 17th century, when it was noted by Japanese sailors. The island was independent from major powers, but had trade contacts with the Batanes islands.

The island was visited by a surveying party from HMS Sylvia in 1867. In the early 1870s, William Campbell saw the island from aboard the Daphne, and wrote:

We had a very stormy passage, so much so, that my servant boy and the Chinese preacher (Chiu Paw-ha) who accompanied me, were dead sick during the seven days we were at sea. While laboring off the Island of Botel Tobago, our mainsail was torn in pieces; and, for several days, every other great sea we faced threatened to engulf us. I was sorry for the poor ship-hands, who had to work hard, and be content with mere snatches of time for food and sleep. It was only through repeated drenchings, and with firm holding on, that I succeeded in getting a good look at the land which came now and then into view. Every one was interested as we approached Botel Tobago. The last European visit to it was by a surveying party from H.M.S. Sylvia in 1867. It stands about twenty-six miles out from the south-eastern end of Formosa, is seven and a half miles long, and densely peopled by an aboriginal race. We saw their huts, and could make out rows of little canoes or rafts drawn up on the beach.

=== Imperial Japan ===
During Japan's rule of Taiwan, the island was known by the name "Kōtō", the Japanese pronunciation of the Chinese spelling 紅頭 ("red head"). The government at the time declared Kōtō Island to be an ethnological research area off-limits to the general public.

=== Republic of China ===
After the Republic of China took over Taiwan, the island was administered as the Hong-tou-yu "township" of Taitung County after 19 January 1946 but the Japanese restrictions on visitors remained in effect. Because of these policies, the Tao continue to have the best-preserved traditions among the Taiwanese aborigines despite the end of the ban on settlement and tourism in 1967.

A nuclear-waste storage facility was built in 1982 without prior consultation with the island's inhabitants. Tao Aborigines have protested, and since the early 1990s demonstrated, their desire to rid their island of the "evil spirits" of nuclear waste. The plant receives nuclear waste from Taiwan's three nuclear power plants, all operated by the state utility Taipower. About 100,000 barrels of nuclear waste have been stored at the Lanyu complex. In 2002 and 2012, there were major protests from local residents, calling on Taipower to remove the waste from the island. In 2026, a group of Tao islanders voyaged to the Batanes islands in the Philippines in a bid to reconnect ties with the Ivatan people and revive the pre-colonial sea route between Orchid Island and the Batanes islands.

== Geography ==
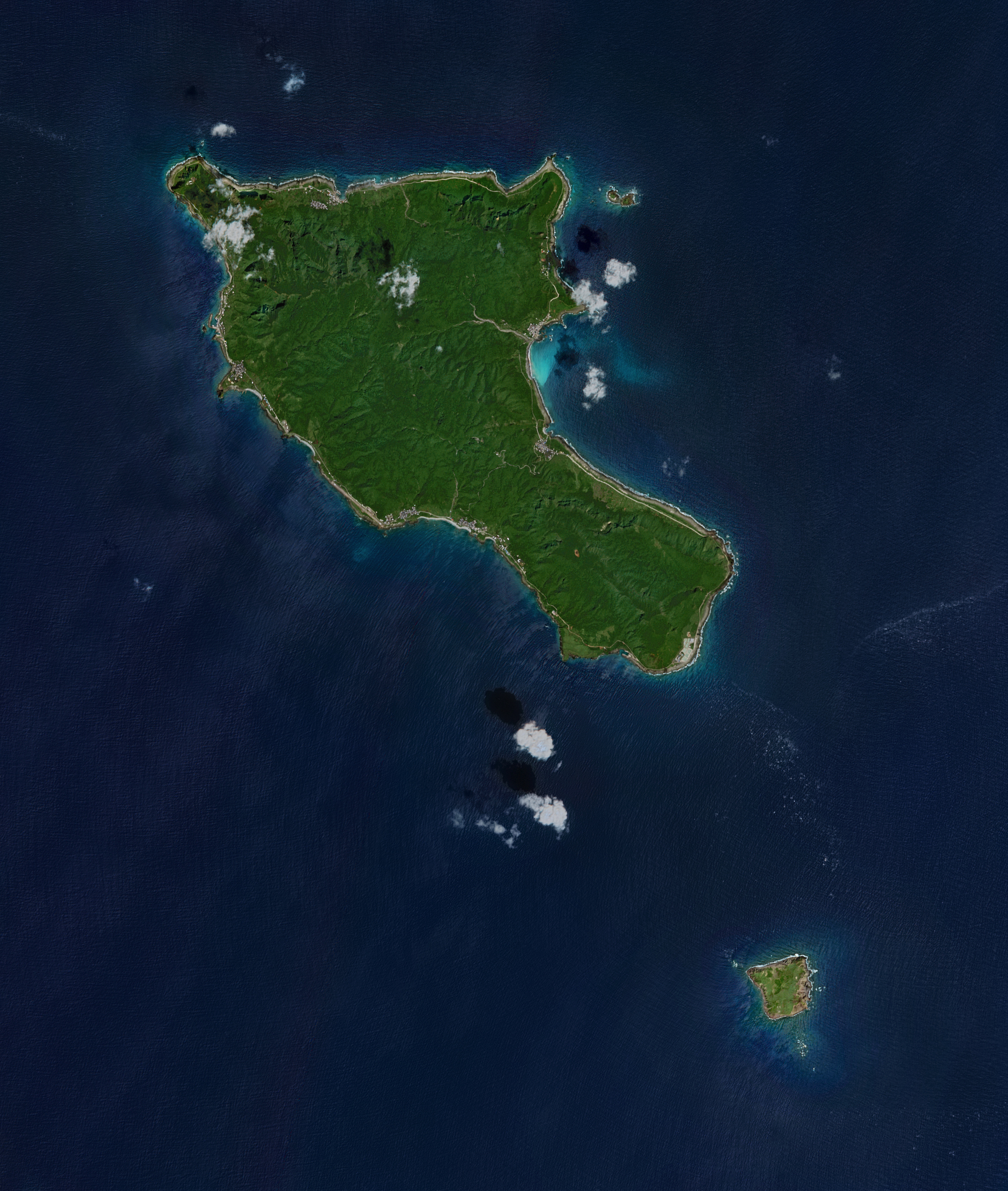
Satellite view of Orchid Island and Lesser Orchid Island

There are eight mountains over 400 m (1,300 ft) high. The tallest mountain is Mount Hongtou or Hongtoushan (紅頭山) at 552 m (1,811 ft). The rock on the island is volcanic tholeiite andesite and explosive fragments. The volcano last erupted in the Miocene period. It is part of the Luzon Volcanic Arc. Magma was formed from underthrusting oceanic crust under compression about 20 km (12 mi) deep. The andesite rock contains some visible crystals of pyroxene or amphibole. The geochemistry of the rock shows that it is enriched in sodium, magnesium, and nickel but depleted in iron, aluminum, potassium, titanium, and strontium.

As the island is within the tropics, the island experiences a warm and rainy tropical climate throughout the year with humidity often reaching more than 90%. Rainfall, abundant throughout the year, cools the temperature significantly. The climate is classified as a monsoon-influenced Köppen's tropical rainforest climate (Af) with frequent cyclones therefore not equatorial, with annual temperatures averaging around 23 °C (73 °F) on the mountains and 26 °C (79 °F) on the coasts, one of the highest in Taiwan.

Forest Belle Rock is located south of Lesser Orchid Island.

Climate data for Lanyu Weather Station – 324 m above sea level (1991–2020 normals, extremes 1942–present）
Month	Jan	Feb	Mar	Apr	May	Jun	Jul	Aug	Sep	Oct	Nov	Dec	Year
Record high °C (°F)	27.3 (81.1)	29.3 (84.7)	29.8 (85.6)	32.1 (89.8)	32.1 (89.8)	33.1 (91.6)	33.1 (91.6)	35.2 (95.4)	32.2 (90.0)	31.1 (88.0)	29.8 (85.6)	28.5 (83.3)	35.2 (95.4)
Mean daily maximum °C (°F)	20.8 (69.4)	21.4 (70.5)	22.9 (73.2)	24.8 (76.6)	26.7 (80.1)	28.0 (82.4)	28.6 (83.5)	28.5 (83.3)	27.7 (81.9)	25.9 (78.6)	23.9 (75.0)	21.5 (70.7)	25.1 (77.1)
Daily mean °C (°F)	18.6 (65.5)	19.0 (66.2)	20.4 (68.7)	22.3 (72.1)	24.3 (75.7)	25.9 (78.6)	26.2 (79.2)	26.0 (78.8)	25.3 (77.5)	23.7 (74.7)	21.9 (71.4)	19.5 (67.1)	22.8 (73.0)
Mean daily minimum °C (°F)	17.0 (62.6)	17.4 (63.3)	18.7 (65.7)	20.7 (69.3)	22.7 (72.9)	24.3 (75.7)	24.6 (76.3)	24.3 (75.7)	23.6 (74.5)	22.3 (72.1)	20.5 (68.9)	18.1 (64.6)	21.2 (70.1)
Record low °C (°F)	9.2 (48.6)	9.5 (49.1)	10.3 (50.5)	11.3 (52.3)	16.1 (61.0)	17.6 (63.7)	20.2 (68.4)	19.3 (66.7)	13.3 (55.9)	14.1 (57.4)	10.8 (51.4)	9.2 (48.6)	9.2 (48.6)
Average precipitation mm (inches)	249.9 (9.84)	190.7 (7.51)	135.2 (5.32)	142.9 (5.63)	247.2 (9.73)	245.8 (9.68)	252.0 (9.92)	328.8 (12.94)	361.1 (14.22)	299.0 (11.77)	282.6 (11.13)	243.5 (9.59)	2,978.7 (117.28)
Average precipitation days (≥ 0.1 mm)	22.0	18.4	16.1	14.3	15.1	13.7	14.9	16.9	18.4	18.2	19.9	21.7	209.6
Average relative humidity (%)	85.6	86.6	86.4	88.2	89.0	90.2	89.4	89.5	86.6	85.8	86.4	85.3	87.4
Mean monthly sunshine hours	73.3	73.5	96.9	109.7	127.7	142.4	179.1	158.2	136.7	125.7	81.6	64.3	1,369.1
Source: Central Weather Bureau

Climate data for Lanyu Weather Station – Ground level
Month	Jan	Feb	Mar	Apr	May	Jun	Jul	Aug	Sep	Oct	Nov	Dec	Year
Mean daily maximum °C (°F)	24.1 (75.4)	24.6 (76.3)	26.3 (79.3)	28.1 (82.6)	30.2 (86.4)	31.0 (87.8)	32.2 (90.0)	32.3 (90.1)	31.7 (89.1)	29.8 (85.6)	27.4 (81.3)	24.8 (76.6)	28.5 (83.4)
Daily mean °C (°F)	21.8 (71.2)	22.5 (72.5)	24.0 (75.2)	25.8 (78.4)	27.9 (82.2)	29.2 (84.6)	29.5 (85.1)	29.3 (84.7)	28.6 (83.5)	27.3 (81.1)	25.1 (77.2)	22.8 (73.0)	26.2 (79.1)
Mean daily minimum °C (°F)	20.2 (68.4)	20.6 (69.1)	22.2 (72.0)	24.1 (75.4)	25.3 (77.5)	27.4 (81.3)	27.9 (82.2)	27.6 (81.7)	26.8 (80.2)	25.5 (77.9)	23.5 (74.3)	21.3 (70.3)	24.4 (75.9)
Source: Lanyu Weather Accuweather

== Administrative divisions ==
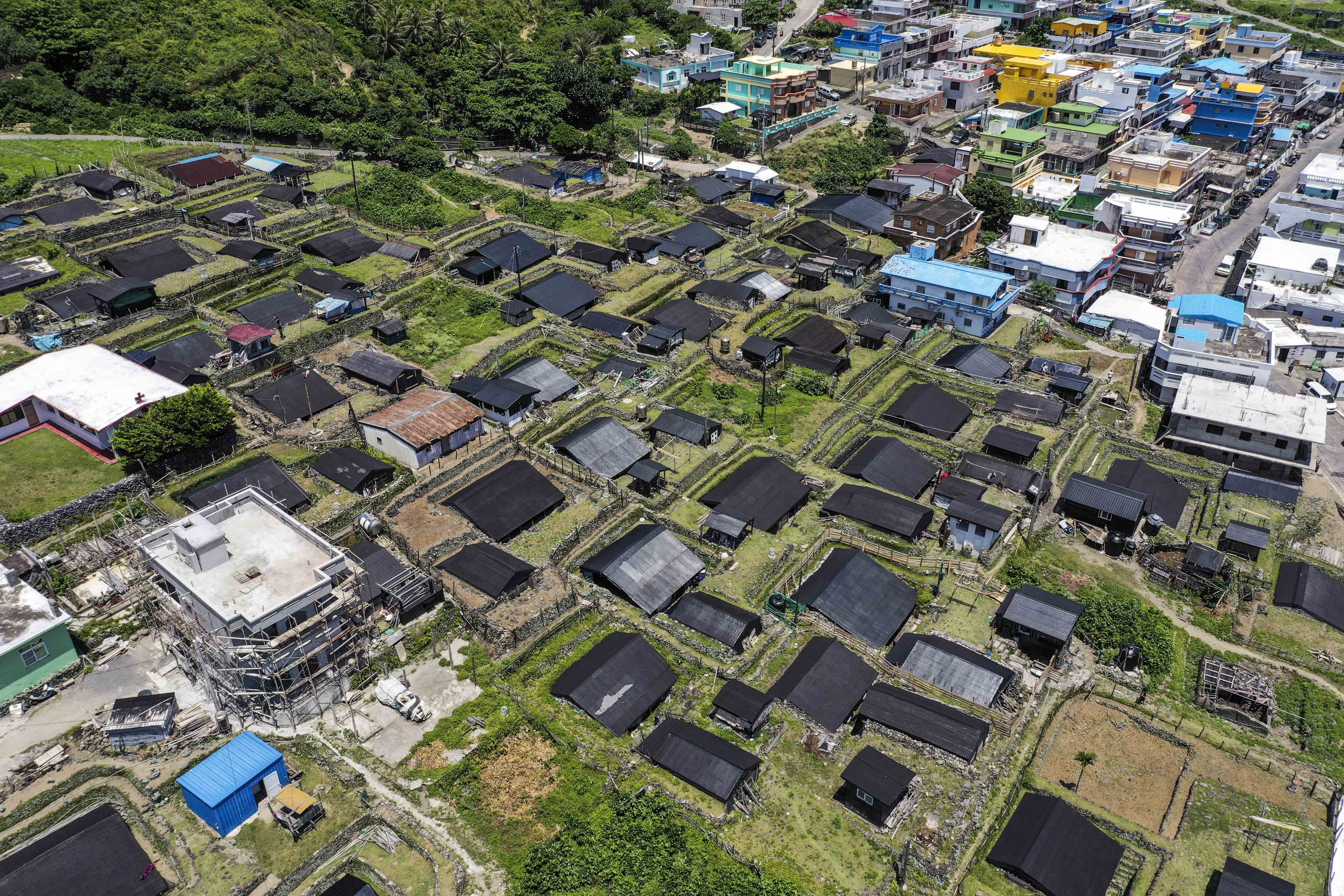
View of Jivalino

There are seven neighborhoods (社) in Lanyu Township, four of which are also administrative villages (村):

Yami name	Chinese		Note
	Pinyin	Chars.	
Jiayo	Yeyou	椰油	village
Jiraralay	Langdao	朗島	village
Jiranmilek	Dongqing	東淸	village
Jivalino	Yeyin	野銀	
Jimowrod	Hongtou	紅頭	village and township seat
Jiratay	Yuren	漁人	incorporated into Hongtou Village in 1946
Iwatas	Yiwadasi	伊瓦達斯	incorporated into Yeyou Village in 1940

== Flora and fauna ==
Orchid Island hosts many tropical plant species, sharing many species with tropical Asia but also many endemics: there are 35 plant species found nowhere else. For example, Pinanga tashiroi is a species of palm tree found nowhere else than Orchid Island.

Green sea turtles make nests on the island, which is surrounded by coral reefs. Four species of sea snake inhabit the waters around the island. Humpback whales were historically common in the area, and there were continuous sightings of them in the 2000s, which marked the first return of the species into Taiwanese waters since the cessation of whaling. Sightings are reported almost every year, although the whales do not stay for long, as they once did. They appear instead to be migratory visitors.

== Economy ==
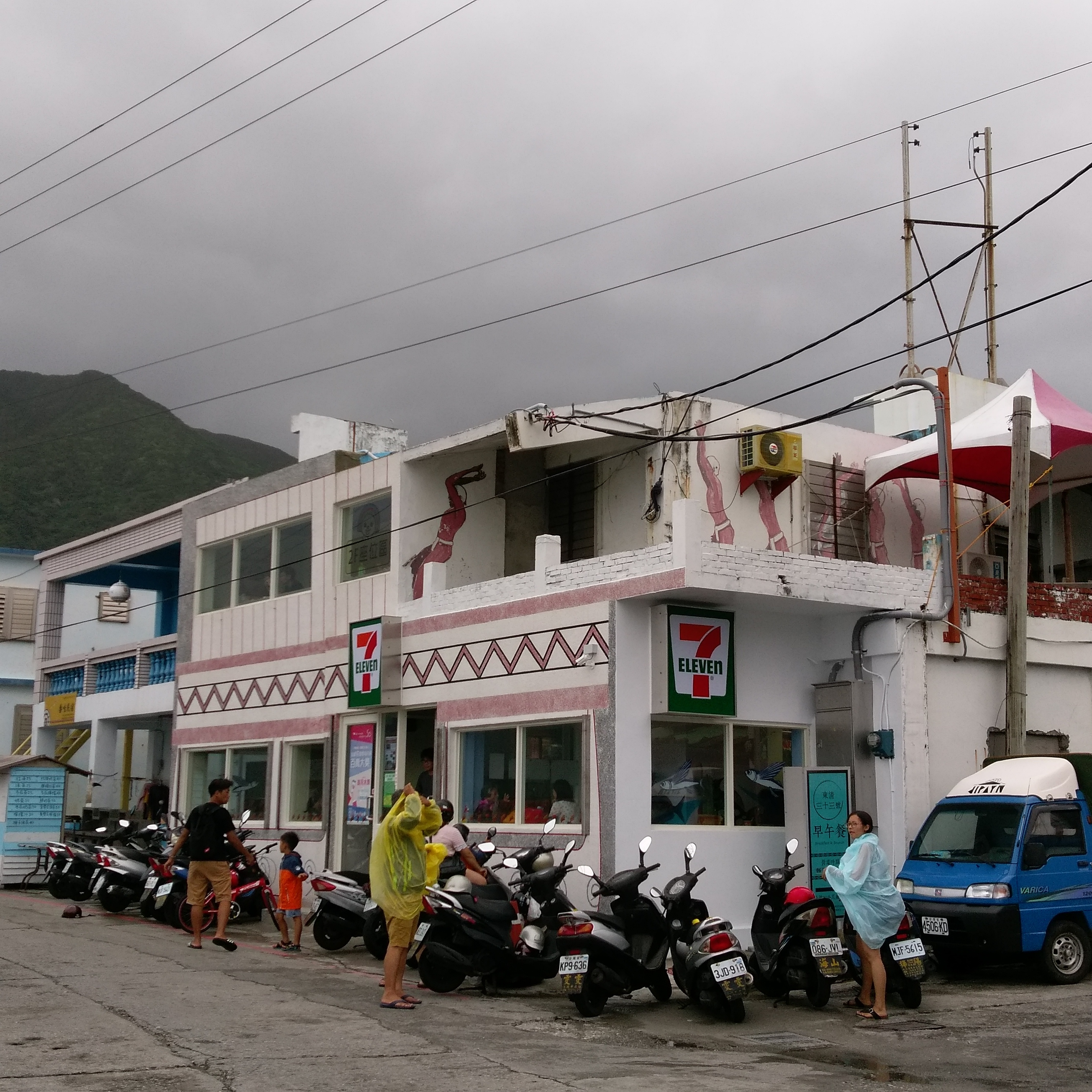
Orchid Island's 7-Eleven

The islanders are mostly farmers and fishermen relying on a large annual catch of flying fish and on wet taro, yams, and millet.

On 19 September 2014, the first 7-Eleven store in the island was opened. During the opening ceremony, the township chief said that the store could provide conveniences to the local residents such as fee and tax collection.

== Energy ==
=== Nuclear waste ===
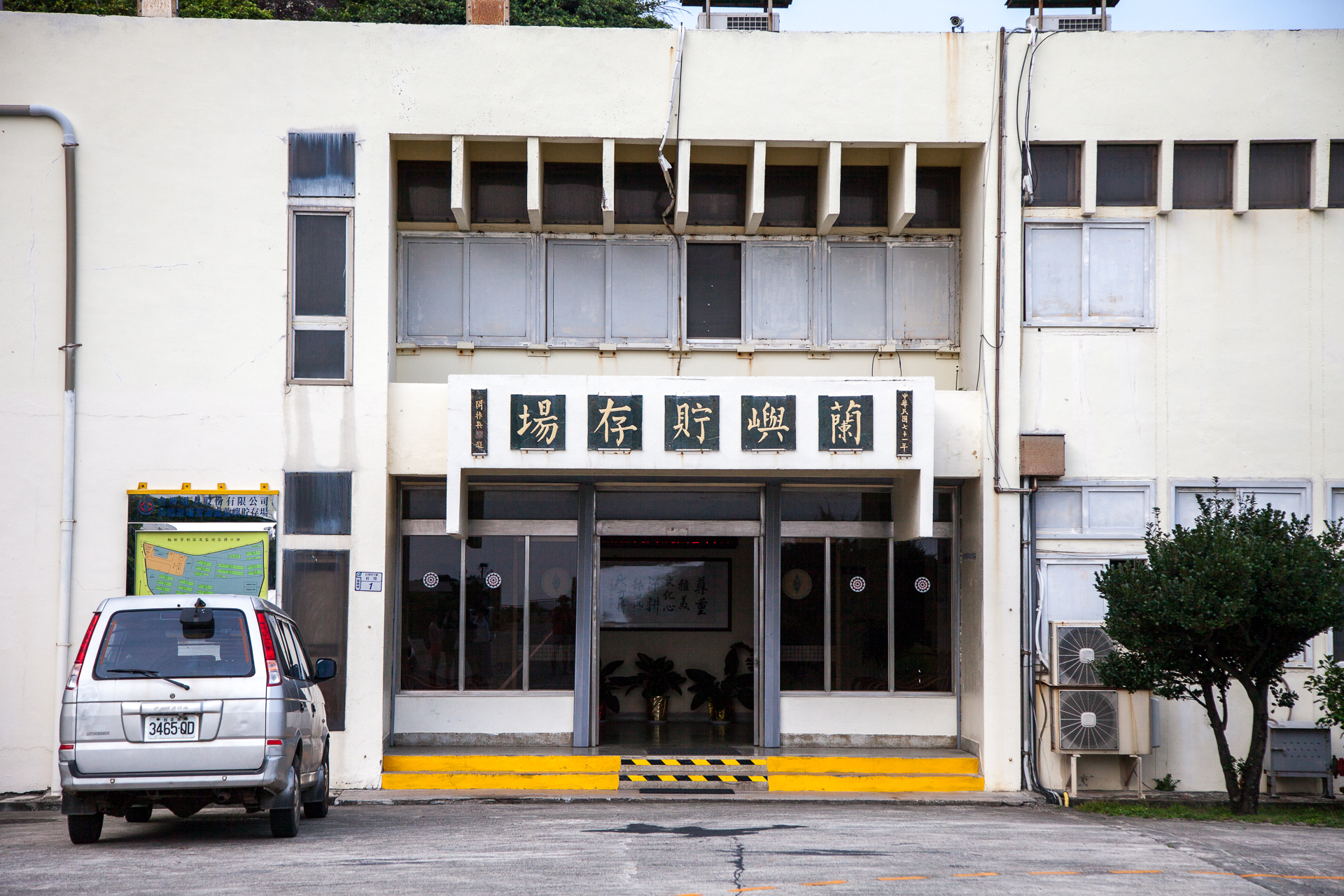
Low-Level Radioactive Waste Storage Site

The Lanyu nuclear waste storage facility was built at the southern tip of Orchid Island in 1982. The plant receives nuclear waste from Taiwan's three nuclear power plants operated by state utility Taiwan Power Company (Taipower). Islanders did not have a say in the decision to locate the facility on the island.

In 2002, almost 2000 protesters, including many residents and elementary and high school students from the island, staged a sit-in in front of the storage plant, calling on Taipower to remove nuclear waste from the island. The government had pledged and then failed to withdraw the 100,000 barrels of waste from their island by the end of 2002. Aboriginal politicians successfully obstructed legislative proceedings that year to show support for the protests. In a bid to allay safety concerns, Taipower has pledged to repackage the waste since many of the iron barrels used for storage have become rusty from the island's salty and humid air. Taipower has for years been exploring ways to ship the nuclear waste overseas for final storage, but plans to store the waste in an abandoned North Korean coal mine have met with strong protests from neighboring South Korea and Japan due to safety and environmental concerns, while storage in Russia or China is complicated by political factors. Taipower is "trying to convince the islanders to extend the storage arrangement for another nine years in exchange for payment of NT$200 million (about $5.7 million)".

Following years of protests by residents, more concerns arose about the facility after Japan's Fukushima nuclear disaster in 2011. A report released in November 2011 said a radioactive leak had been detected outside the facility and this has added to residents' concerns. In February 2012, hundreds of Tao living on Orchid Island held a protest outside the nuclear waste storage facility. Chang Hai-yu, a preacher at a local church, said "it was a tragedy that Tao children are being born into a radiation-filled environment". Lanyu mayor Chiang To-li "urged Taipower to remove nuclear waste from the island as soon as possible".

In March 2012, about 2,000 people staged an anti-nuclear protest in Taiwan's capital Taipei. Scores of aboriginal protesters "demanded the removal of 100,000 barrels of nuclear waste stored on Orchid Island, off south-eastern Taiwan. Authorities have failed to find a substitute storage site amid increased awareness of nuclear danger over the past decade".

=== Power generation ===
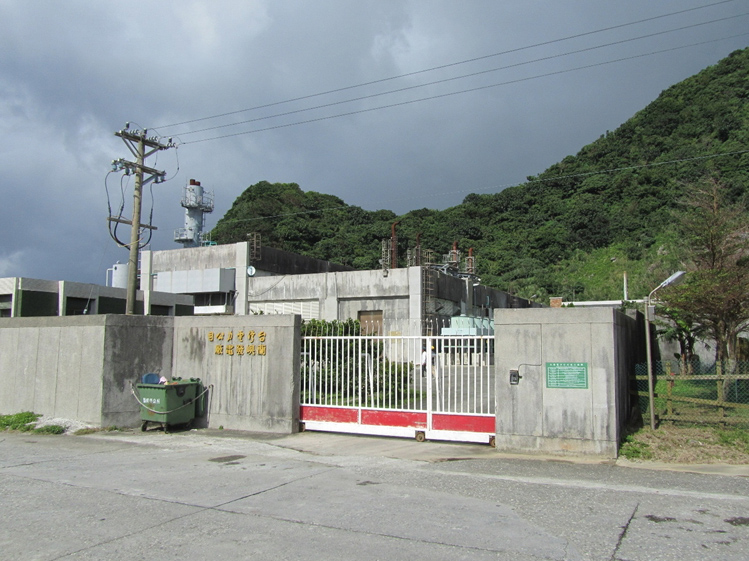
Lanyu Power Plant

The island houses its only power generation facility, the fuel-fired Lanyu Power Plant. Commissioned in 1982, the plant has a total installed capacity of 6.5 MW and is owned and operated by Taipower. Stipulated under Article 14 of the Offshore Islands Development Act, households on the island enjoy free electricity. The situation on the island resulted from the preferential policy given to the island residents due to the construction of the Lanyu Storage Site on the island in 1982.

Due to the free electricity, electricity consumption on the island is generally much higher than in other parts of Taiwan. In 2011, the average annual electricity consumption per household in Lanyu was 6,522 kWh, almost twice the 3,654 kWh Taiwan average. In 2002, Taipower provided an equivalent of NT$6.35 million worth of electricity to the island, and in 2011 the amount rose to NT$24.39 million. Due to this suspected abuse, members of Control Yuan called for an investigation into the electricity subsidy to Lanyu Island in 2012.

== Gallery ==
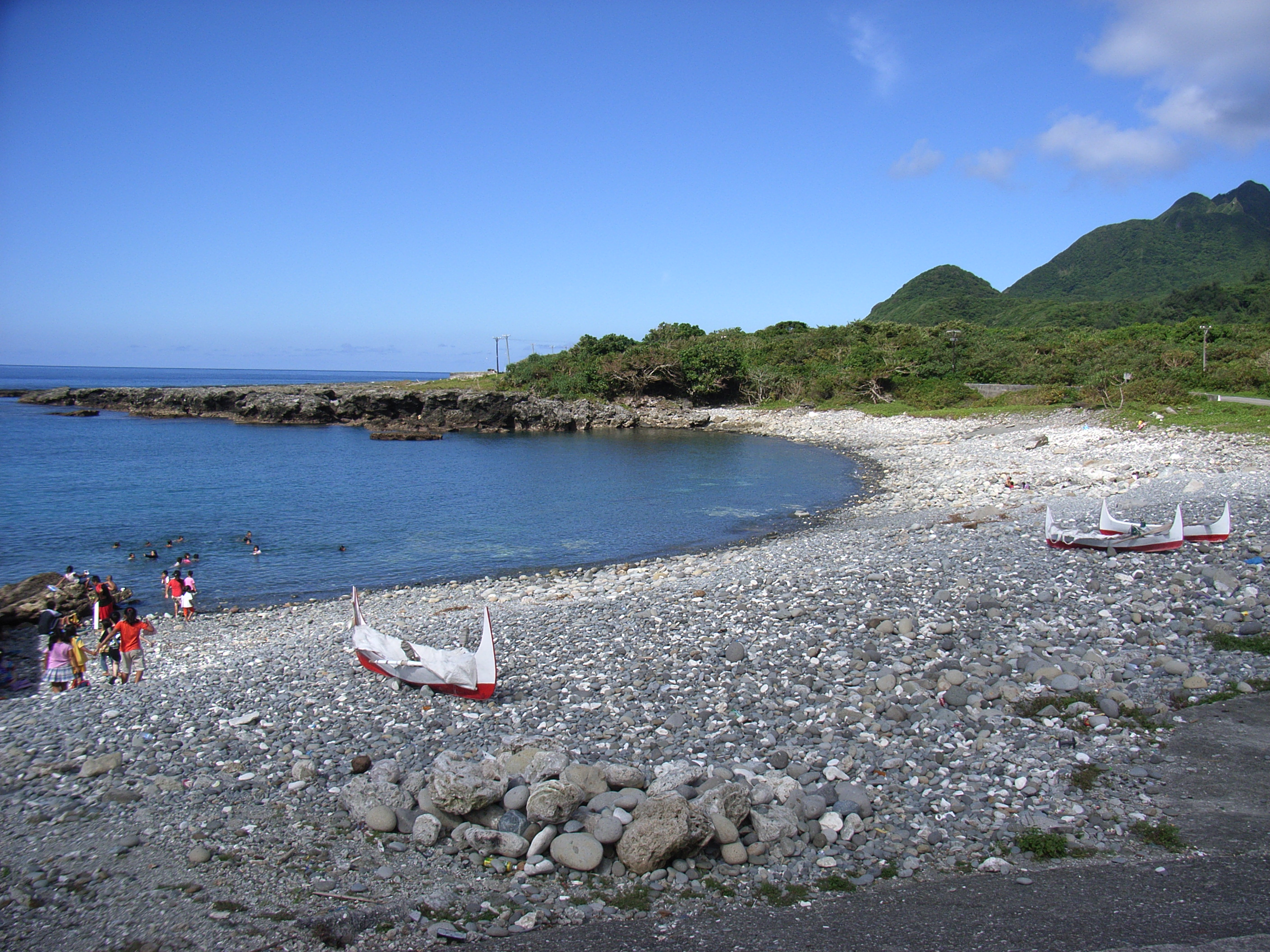
Langdao beach

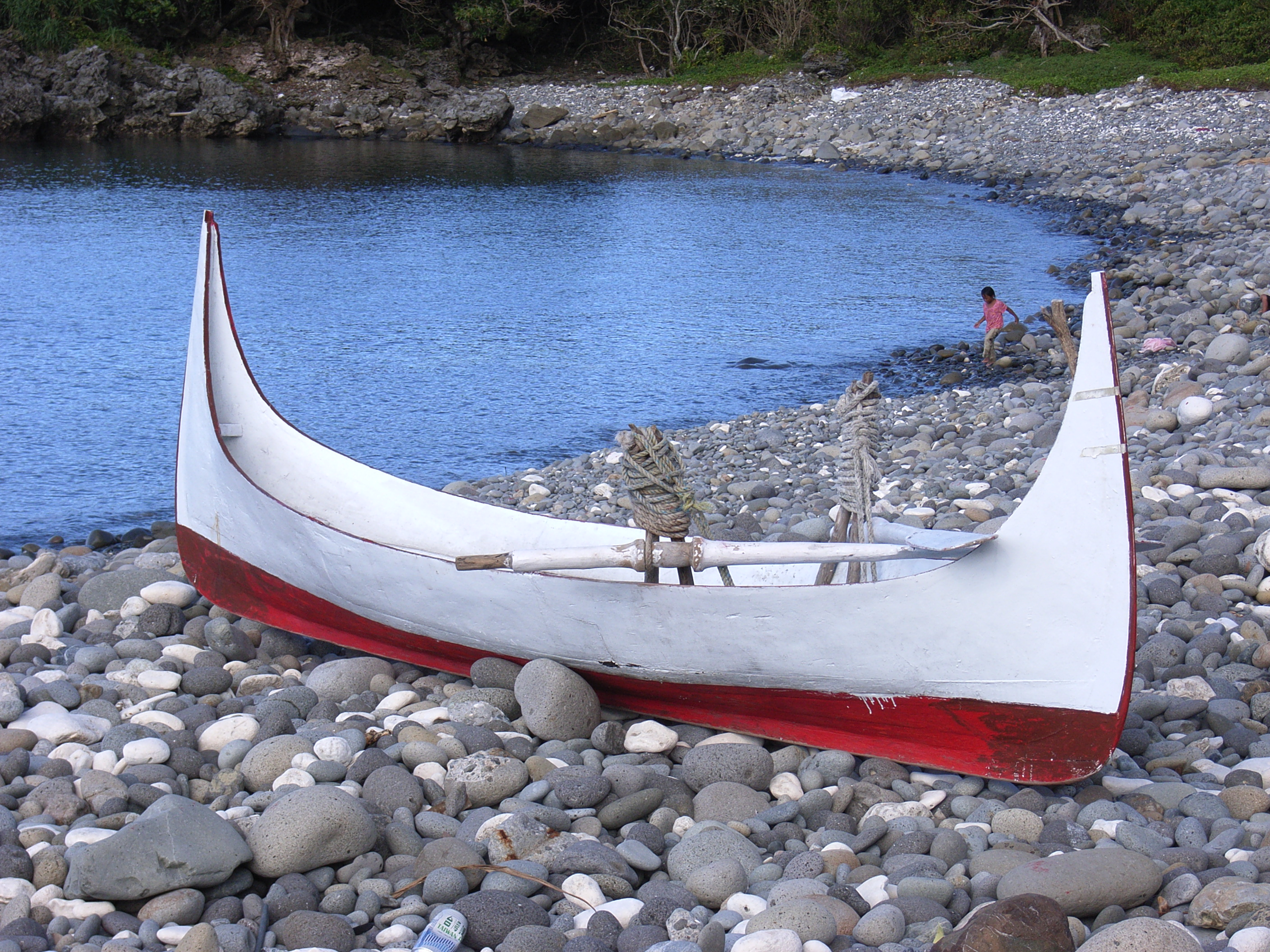
Traditional canoe

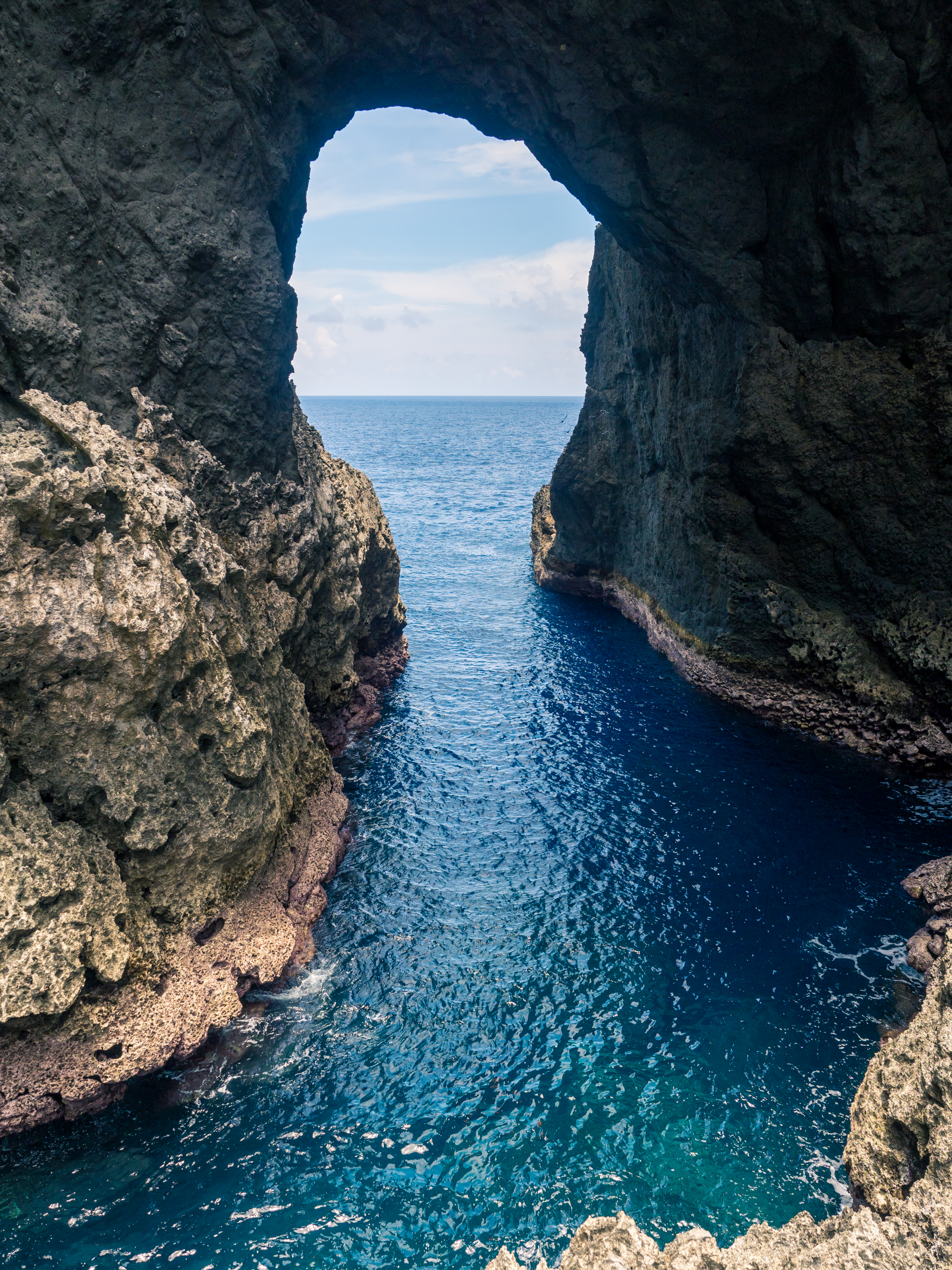
Lovers' Cave near Iranmeylek

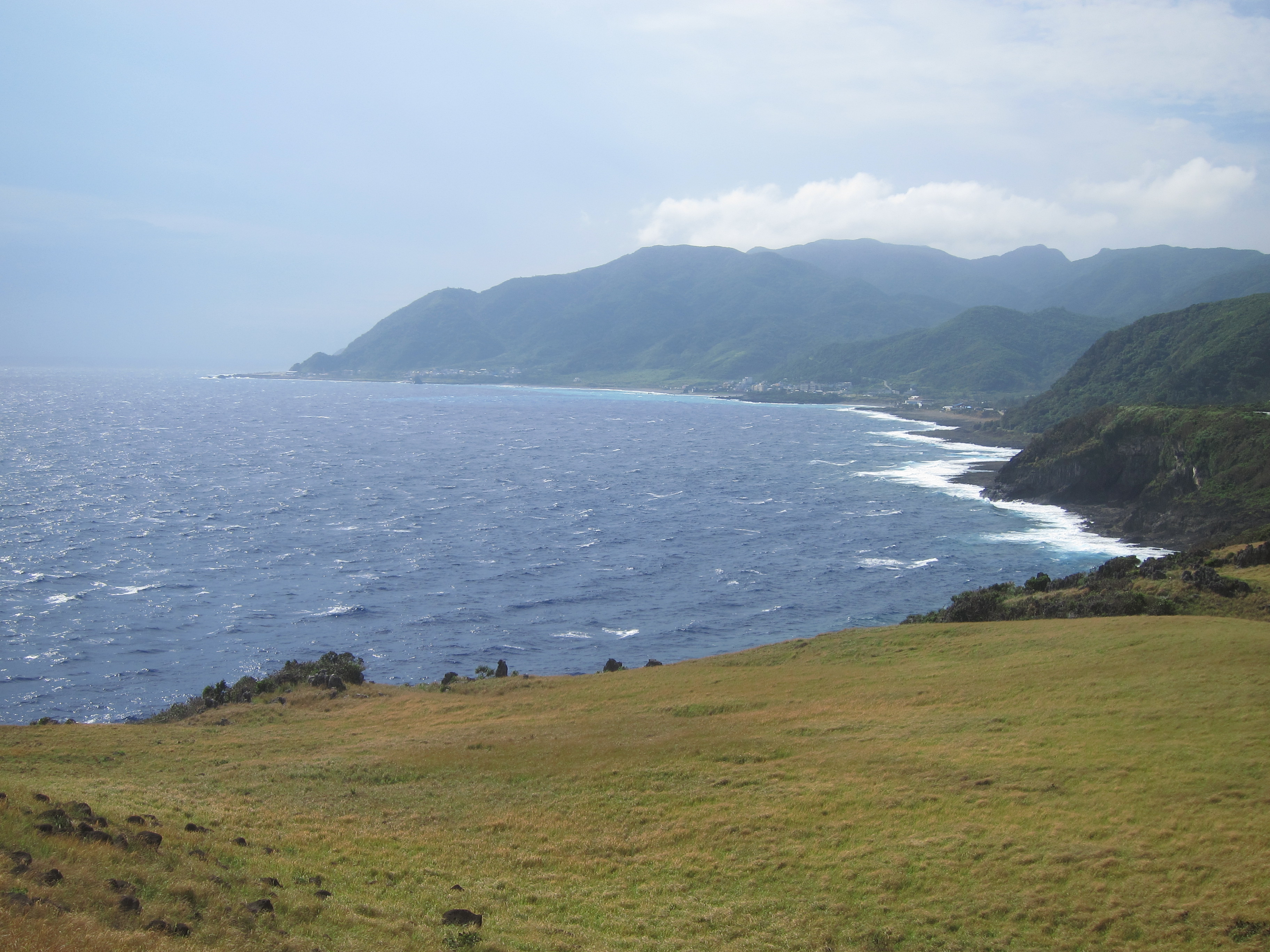
Fields along the coast

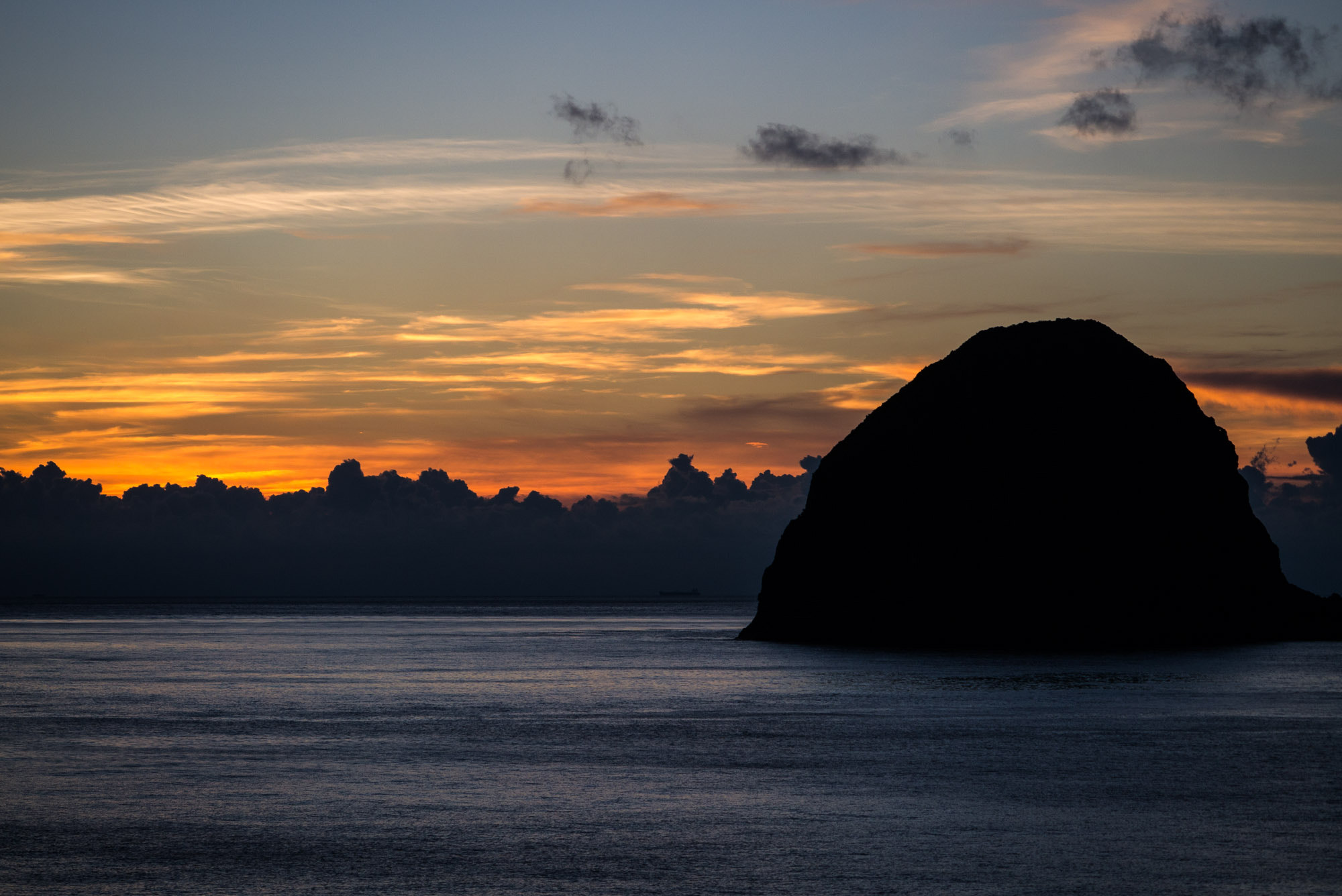
Mantou Rock

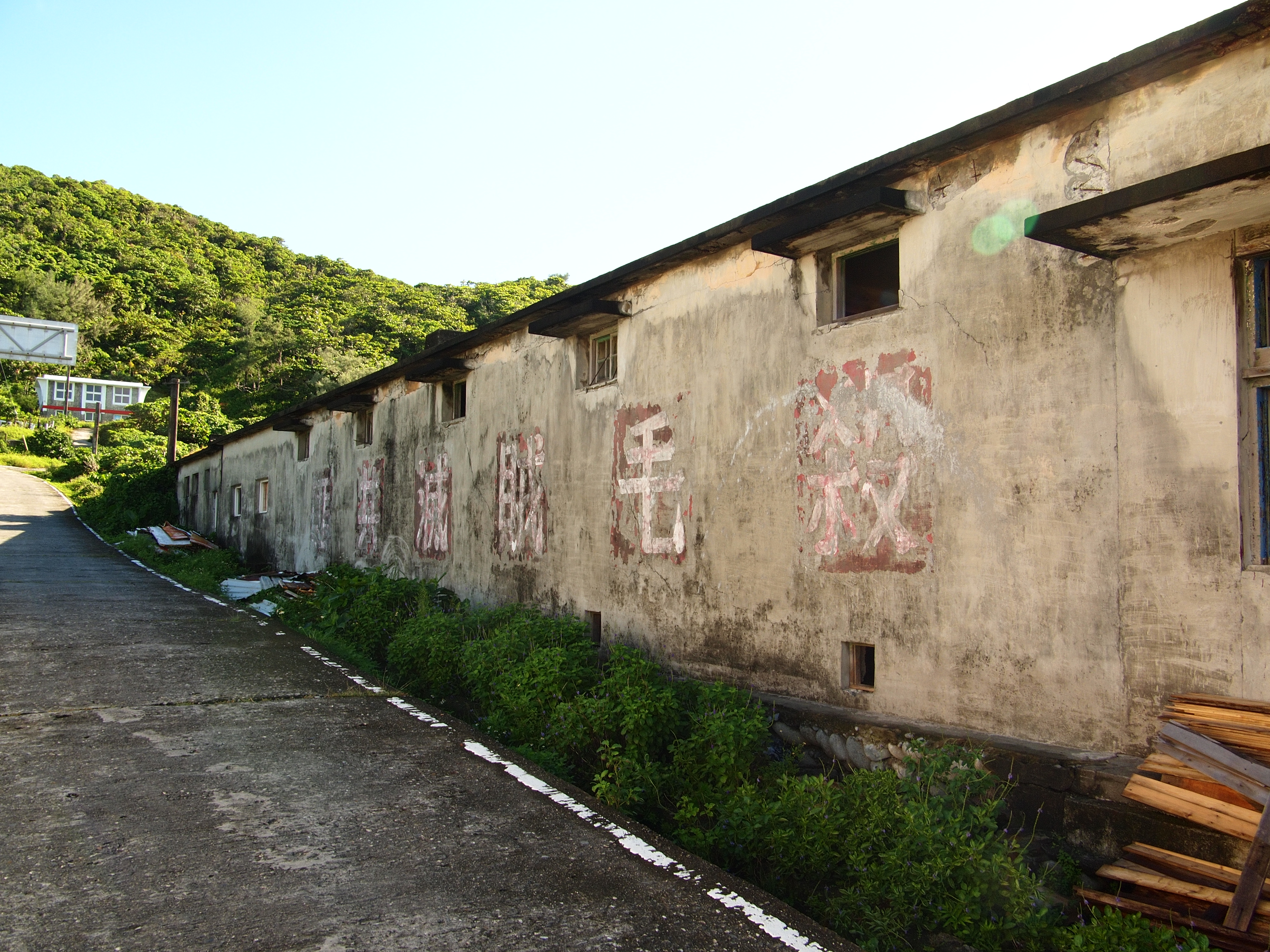
Old anti-Communist slogan

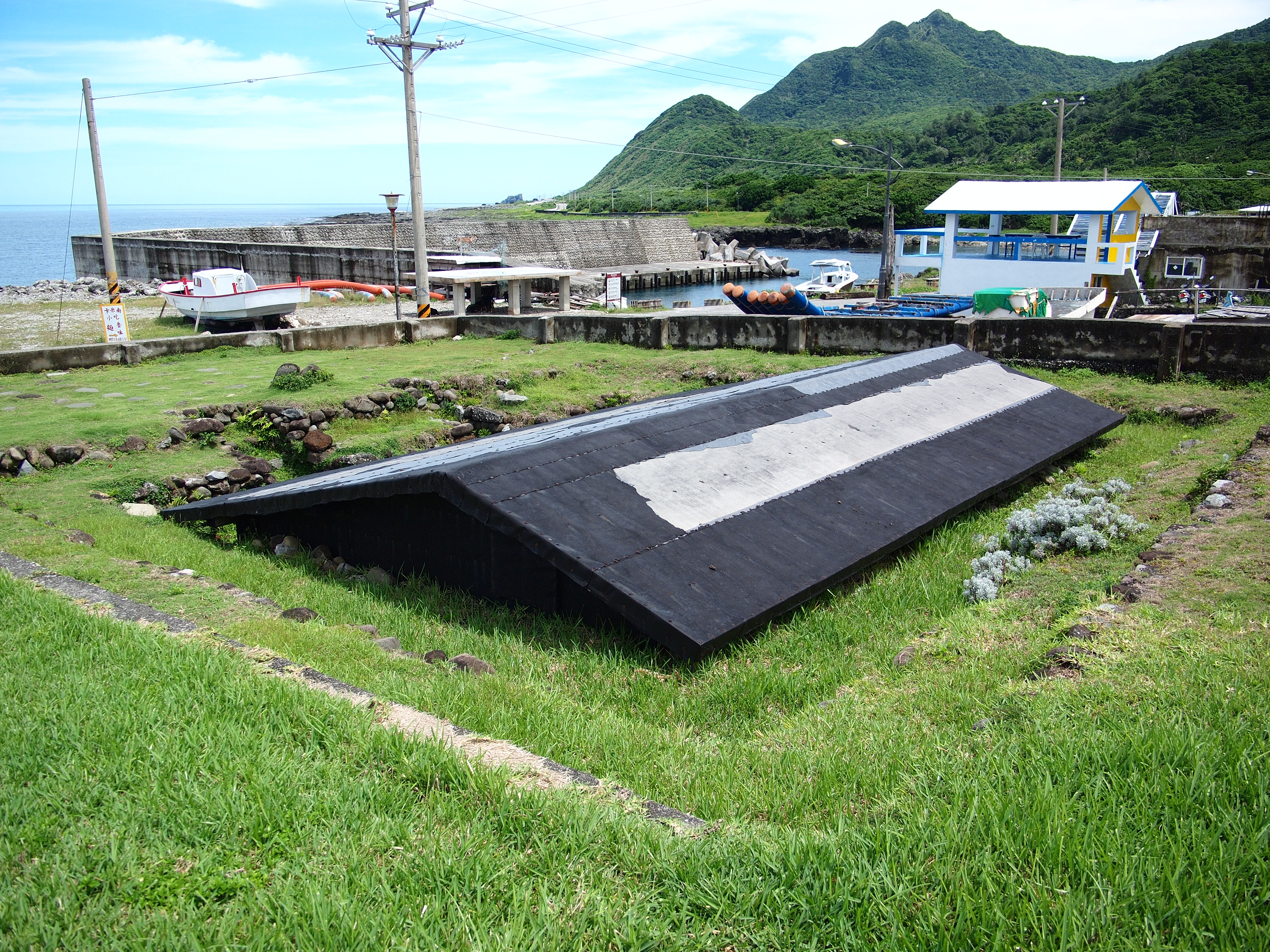
Traditional Tao building

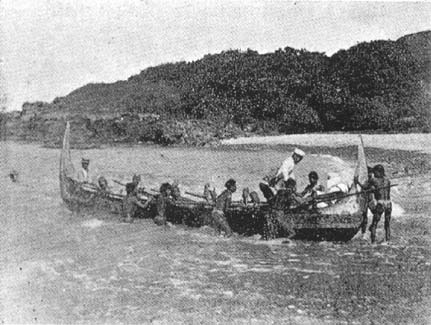
Tao fishermen in 1900

== See also ==
- Green Island – the other offshore township of Taitung County
- List of islands of Taiwan
- List of volcanoes in Taiwan
