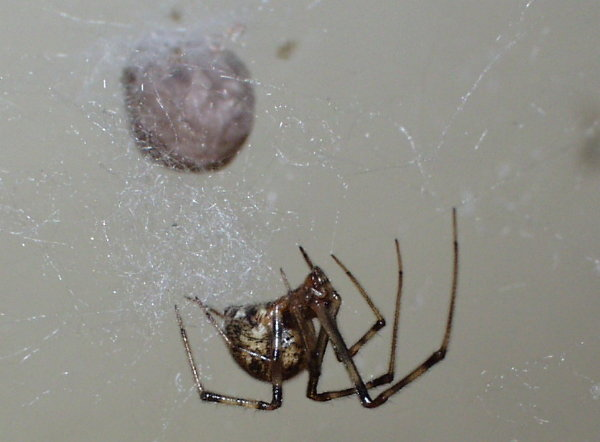
- P. tepidariorum

Scientific classification
- Kingdom: Animalia
- Phylum: Arthropoda
- Subphylum: Chelicerata
- Class: Arachnida
- Order: Araneae
- Infraorder: Araneomorphae
- Family: Theridiidae
- Genus: Parasteatoda; Archer, 1946

Type species
- P. tepidariorum (C. L. Koch, 1841)

Species
- 42, see text

= Parasteatoda =

Genus of spiders

Parasteatoda is a genus of comb-footed spiders that was first described by Allan Frost Archer in 1946.

== Name ==
The name is a combination of the Ancient Greek "para-" (παρά), meaning "near" or "next to", and the theridiid genus Steatoda.

The Japanese name for this genus is O-himegumo zoku.

== Description ==
The eye arrangement of spiders in the genus Parasteatoda

Parasteatoda species have a characteristic teardrop-shaped abdomen, with the anterior section much higher than the carapace and the spinnerets pointed downwards. The abdomen's colouration is highly variable, both between and often within species. They have slight sexual dimorphism; males are visually similar to females, although slightly smaller.

The carapace is oval. The stridulating apparatus of the male is present as a partial lunate plate on either side of the pedicel. The abdomen is nearly spherical, usually with a small posterior projection.

The basic colour ranges from greyish brown to blackish brown, while some are bright orange, with a broad, longitudinal cardiac pattern and some transverse spots. The leg formula is 1243 in males and 1423 in females.

== Species ==
It is mostly an Old World genus, with many species found in Asia and New Guinea, though the distribution reaches into Europe. A few species originate from the New World, but many have been introduced, and they are becoming more widespread in the Americas and Europe.

== Species ==
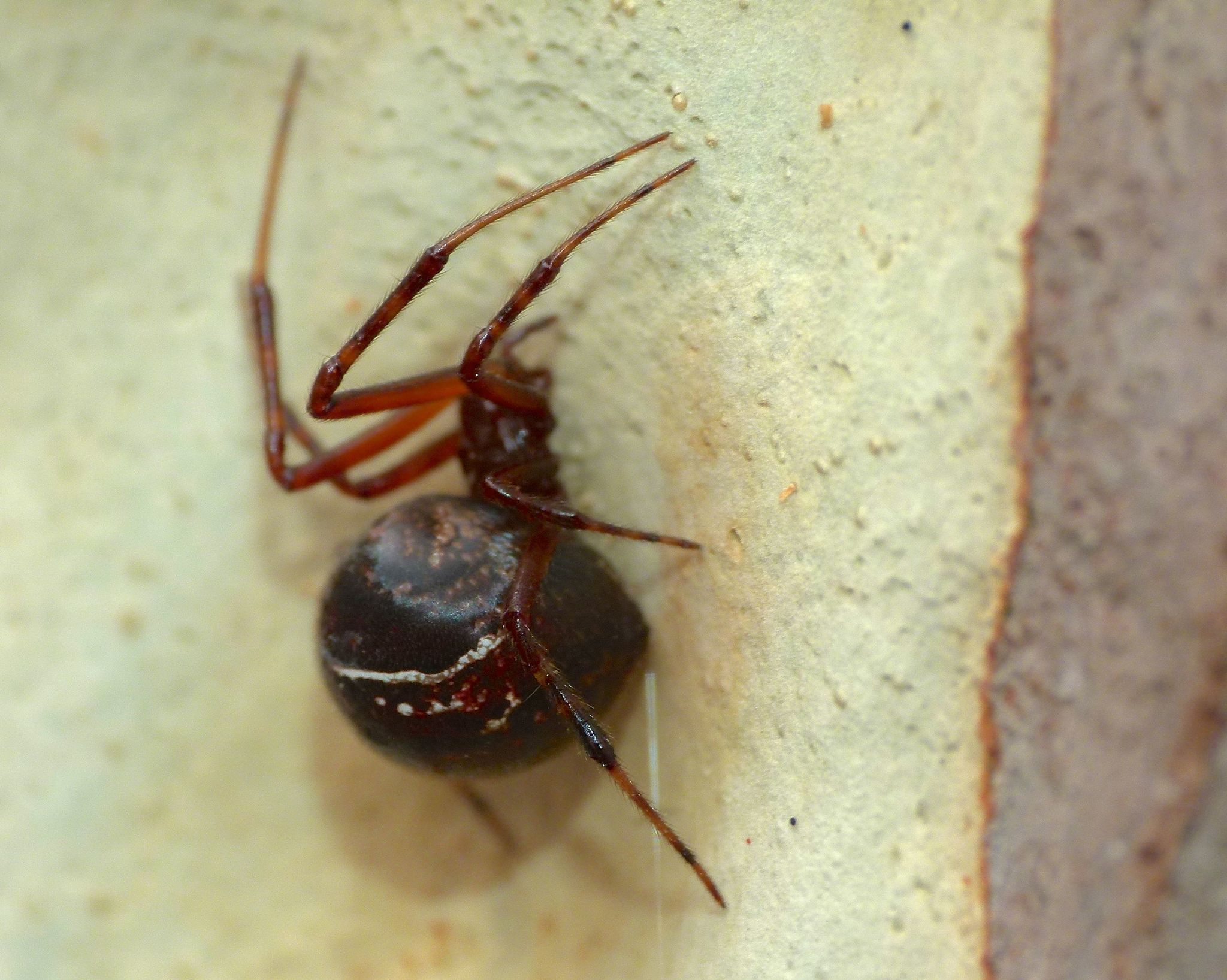
P. decorata

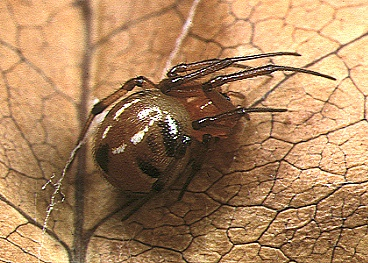
P. japonica

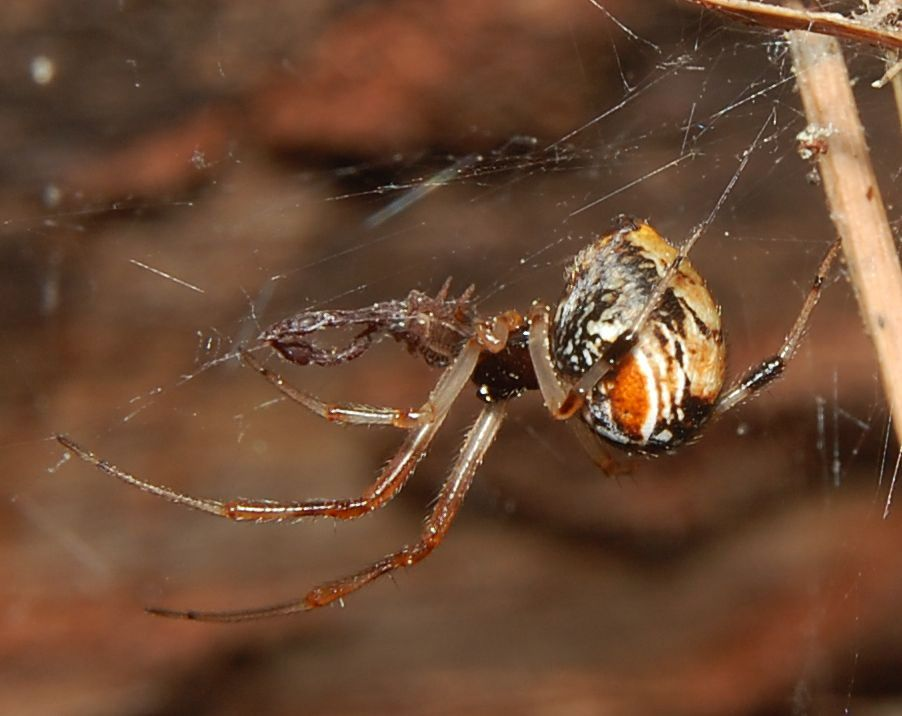
P. lunata

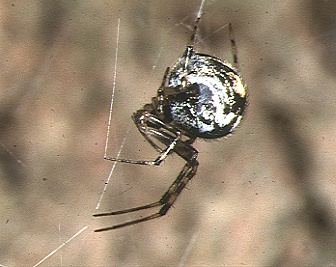
P. ryukyu

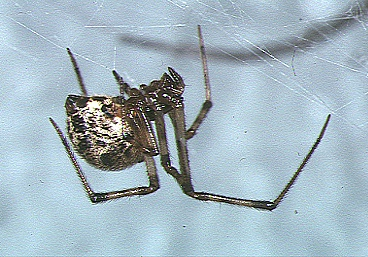
P. tepidariorum

As of October 2025, this genus includes 42 species and one subspecies:

- Parasteatoda aequipeiformis Yang, Irfan & Peng, 2019 – China
- Parasteatoda angulithorax (Bösenberg & Strand, 1906) – Russia (Far East), China, Korea, Japan
- Parasteatoda asiatica (Bösenberg & Strand, 1906) – China, Taiwan, Korea, Japan
- Parasteatoda camura (Simon, 1877) – China (Hainan), Philippines, Indonesia (New Guinea), Solomon Islands
- Parasteatoda celsabdomina (Zhu, 1998) – India, China, Thailand, Laos
- Parasteatoda cingulata (Zhu, 1998) – China, Thailand?
- Parasteatoda corrugata Yoshida, 2016 – Japan
- Parasteatoda culicivora (Bösenberg & Strand, 1906) – China, Taiwan, Korea, Japan
- Parasteatoda daliensis (Zhu, 1998) – China, Laos
- Parasteatoda decorata (L. Koch, 1867) – Indonesia (Krakatau), New Guinea, Australia (Queensland)
- Parasteatoda ducta (Zhu, 1998) – Taiwan, China (Hainan) (type species)
- Parasteatoda galeiforma (Zhu, Zhang & Xu, 1991) – China
- Parasteatoda gui (Zhu, 1998) – China
- Parasteatoda hammeni (Chrysanthus, 1963) – Indonesia (New Guinea)
- Parasteatoda hatsushibai Yoshida, 2009 – Japan
- Parasteatoda jinghongensis (Zhu, 1998) – China
- Parasteatoda kaindi (Levi, Lubin & Robinson, 1982) – Papua New Guinea
- Parasteatoda kentingensis Yoshida, 2015 – Taiwan
- Parasteatoda kompirensis (Bösenberg & Strand, 1906) – India, China, Korea, Japan
- Parasteatoda lanyuensis (Yoshida, Tso & Severinghaus, 2000) – Taiwan
- Parasteatoda longiducta (Zhu, 1998) – China
- Parasteatoda lunata (Clerck, 1757) – Europe, Turkey, Israel, Caucasus, Russia (Europe to Far East), Iran. Introduced to South Africa
- Parasteatoda merapiensis Yoshida & Takasuka, 2011 – Indonesia (Java)
- Parasteatoda nigrovittata (Keyserling, 1884) – Mexico to Argentina
- Parasteatoda oxymaculata (Zhu, 1998) – China, India, Laos
- Parasteatoda palmata Gao & Li, 2014 – China
- Parasteatoda polygramma (Kulczyński, 1911) – New Guinea
- Parasteatoda quadrimaculata (Yoshida, Tso & Severinghaus, 2000) – Taiwan
- Parasteatoda ryukyu (Yoshida, 2000) – Korea, Japan, Taiwan
- Parasteatoda simulans (Thorell, 1875) – Europe, Turkey, Caucasus, Russia (Europe to South Siberia)
- Parasteatoda songi (Zhu, 1998) – China
- Parasteatoda subtabulata (Zhu, 1998) – China
- Parasteatoda subvexa (Zhu, 1998) – China
- Parasteatoda tabulata (Levi, 1980) – Tropical Asia. Introduced to North America, Europe, Georgia, Russia (Europe to Far East), Central Asia, China, Korea, Japan
- Parasteatoda taiwanica Yoshida, 2015 – Taiwan
- Parasteatoda tepidariorum (C. L. Koch, 1841) – Asia. Introduced to Canada, United States, South America, Europe, Morocco, Turkey, Caucasus, Russia (Europe to Far East), St. Helena, South Africa, Seychelles, New Zealand, Hawaii (type species)
  - P. t. australis (Thorell, 1895) – Myanmar
- Parasteatoda transipora (Zhu & Zhang, 1992) – China, Taiwan
- Parasteatoda triangula (Yoshida, 1993) – Singapore, Indonesia (Java, Bali)
- Parasteatoda valoka (Chrysanthus, 1975) – New Guinea, Papua New Guinea (New Britain)
- Parasteatoda vervoorti (Chrysanthus, 1975) – New Guinea
- Parasteatoda wangi Jin & Zhang, 2013 – China
- Parasteatoda wau (Levi, Lubin & Robinson, 1982) – Papua New Guinea

Formerly included:

- P. brookesiana (Barrion & Litsinger, 1995) (Transferred to Nihonhimea)
- P. campanulata (Chen, 1993) (Transferred to Campanicola)
- P. ferrumequina (Bösenberg & Strand, 1906) (Transferred to Campanicola)
- P. japonica (Bösenberg & Strand, 1906) (Transferred to Nihonhimea)
- P. mundula (L. Koch, 1872) (Transferred to Nihonhimea)
- P. mundula (Chrysanthus, 1963) (Transferred to Nihonhimea)
- P. oculiprominens Saito, 1939 (Transferred to Keijiella)
- P. tesselata (Keyserling, 1884) (Transferred to Nihonhimea)

In synonymy:

- P. boqueronica (Kraus, 1955) = Parasteatoda nigrovittata (Keyserling, 1884)
- P. krausi (Chrysanthus, 1963) = Parasteatoda camura (Simon, 1877)
- P. lunata (Olivier, 1789) = Parasteatoda lunata (Clerck, 1757)
- P. mesax Levi, 1959 = Parasteatoda nigrovittata (Keyserling, 1884)
- P. nipponica (Yoshida, 1983) = Parasteatoda tabulata (Levi, 1980)
- P. obnubila (Keyserling, 1891) = Parasteatoda nigrovittata (Keyserling, 1884)
- P. pallida (Walckenaer, 1841) = Parasteatoda tepidariorum (C. L. Koch, 1841)
