= Wang Shih-chien =

Taiwanese politician

- 王世堅
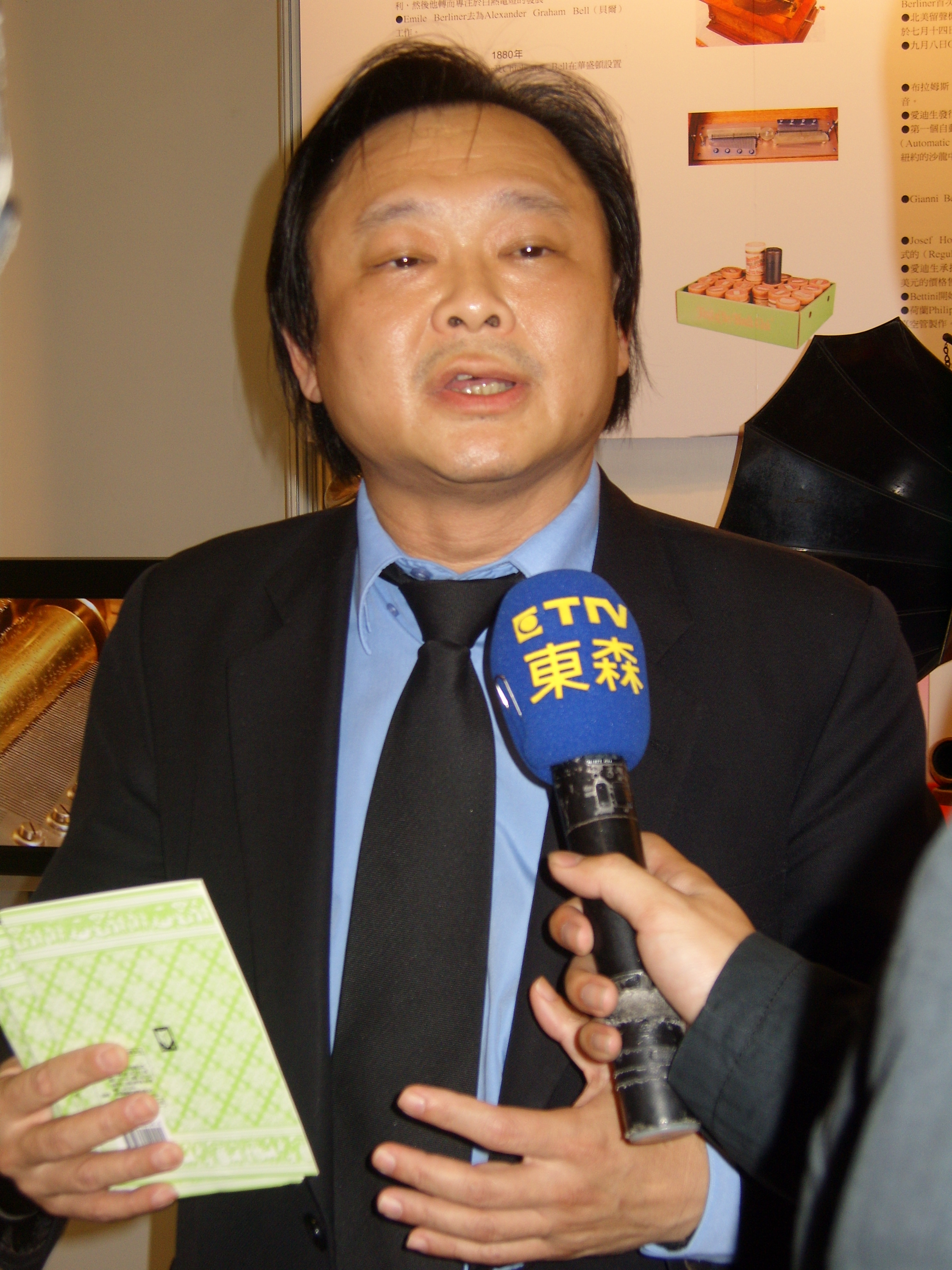
- Wang in 2007

Member of the Legislative Yuan
- Incumbent
- Assumed office 1 February 2024
- Preceded by: Mark Ho
- Constituency: Taipei II
- In office 1 February 2005 – 31 January 2008
- Succeeded by: Justin Chou (as sole representative)
- Constituency: Taipei II

Taipei City Councillor
- In office 25 December 2010 – 1 February 2024
- Constituency: 4th District (Zhongshan, Datong)
- In office 25 December 1998 – 31 January 2005
- Constituency: 4th District (Zhongshan, Datong)

Personal details
- Born: January 1, 1960 (age 66) Taipei, Taiwan
- Party: Democratic Progressive Party
- Spouse: Lin Hsiu-fen
- Children: 2
- Education: National Chung Hsing University (BS); Chinese Culture University (MS)

Chinese name
- Traditional Chinese: 王世堅
- Simplified Chinese: 王世坚
Transcriptions
Standard Mandarin
- Hanyu Pinyin: Wáng Shìjiān
- Wade–Giles: Wang² Shih⁴-chien¹

Wang Shih-chien (Chinese: 王世堅; pinyin: Wáng Shìjiān; born 1 January 1960) is a Taiwanese politician and businessman. A member of the Democratic Progressive Party (DPP), he has served as a member of the Legislative Yuan representing Taipei City Constituency 2. He previously served on the Taipei City Council from 1998 to 2005 and was also a legislator from 2005 to 2008.

== Early life and education ==
Wang Shih-chien was born in Taipei, Taiwan, on January 1, 1960. Both of his parents attended Japanese universities. His father, Wang Ming-te (王明德), was a member of the Chinese Communist Party (CCP) at National Taiwan University who studied under Xie Xuehong. Ming-te was a successful financier who became a senior executive at the Bank of Taiwan. Wang Shih-chien's paternal grandfather was a businessman who sold scrap metal, steel bars, and cement. His maternal grandfather, Chang Jung-tsung (張榮宗), was a leader of the Taiwanese Cultural Association during Japanese rule who was executed in the February 28 incident.

After graduating from Taipei Tsai Hsing Senior High School, Wang studied applied mathematics at National Chung Hsing University, where he graduated with a B.S. degree. He then earned a Master of Science (M.S.) in applied chemistry from Chinese Culture University in 1992. He wrote his master's thesis, "Electrochemical studies of nickel Bis-(2,2': 6',2""-Terpyridine) with alkyl/aryl/allyl bromides and activated olefins in nonaqueous solvents", on the chemical compound Terpyridine. In college, he befriended Liu Yi-te and Lee I-yang, and defrayed his university expenses by playing and teaching the violin part-time.

== Business career ==
After college, Wang entered the construction industry, where he partnered with steel and cement companies, and became the chairman of Richeng Construction Factory (Chinese: 日程營造廠). His first independently completed construction project was in Tianmu district. He owns two subsidiary companies, Rih-cheng Xin Construction and Rih-cheng Construction Factory, both of which launched the "Rih-cheng e-home" project in Xizhi, with a total price of NT$3.2 billion, and the "Rih-cheng Haikuo" project in Tamsui, with a total price of NT$1.2 billion.

== Political career ==
Wang served on the Taipei City Council from 1998 to 2005. He was elected to the Legislative Yuan in 2004, and served a single term until 2008. He contested the 2010 municipal elections, and returned to the Taipei City Council, representing the fourth constituency.

He is often mocked by opponents and Internet communities for his resemblance to Chucky, a possessed doll. However, he has embraced this nickname and has stated, "It is my job to protect the interests of Taipei residents, so I would be happy to be their Chucky to scare the mayor, city officials and others in authority so they do not abuse their power."

Wang was given wide media exposure for losing a bet, in which he promised to jump into the sea if all eight of the Kuomintang's candidates in Taipei City won during the 2008 Taiwanese Legislative Elections. He ended up keeping his promise, accompanying 280 supporters to the sea and jumping into it from a jet ski. "Here I am. I did what I promised," he said after completing the jump.

== Controversy ==
=== Present-giving in Taipei City Council debates ===
Wang had a long-standing habit of sending gifts during council debates. During Ko Wen-je's mayorship, Wang sent a total of 32 gifts on the intention to mock Ko, which includes a dragon robe, magic mirror, folding bike, the One Ring, a copy of Sun Zi's Art of War, a children's book titled "The Boasting Frog", an inflated trojan horse with Ko's face and the flag of PRC on it, copies of Ko's written book, Sumikko Gurashi manga book, a puppet with the flag of China, the last place pennant, backscratcher, scarecrow, among others. The practice continued during Chiang Wan-an's mayorship, which includes a portrait of Chiang Kai-shek and a bear-shaped screwdriver from iThinking, among others.

=== Internet popularity ===
During the plenary session in Taipei City Council on 12 June 2017, Wang criticized Ko for the budget allocation of the 2017 Summer Universiade costing NT$17 billion, saying that "What should have been a leisurely and effortless affair is now a hurried and frantic scramble!" (本來應該從從容容遊刃有餘，現在是匆匆忙忙連滾帶爬！). In October 2025, his quote has been remixed into a song and was popularized as a meme in Chinese internet circles, especially TikTok.

== Personal life ==
Wang is married to Lin Hsiu-fen (Chinese: 林秀芬). The couple has a son and a daughter.
