= Taipei City Constituency 2 =

Constituency of the Legislative Yuan of Taiwan

Taipei City Constituency II
- Single-member constituency for the Legislative Yuan
- District(s): Datong & parts of Shilin

Current constituency
- Created: 2008
- Members: Justin Chou Shou-hsun (2008–2012); Pasuya Yao Wun-chih (2012–2018); Ho Chih-wei (2019–2024); Wang Shih-chien (2024-)

Taipei City Constituency II (Chinese: 臺北市第二選舉區; pinyin: Táiběi Shì Dì-èr Xuǎnjǔ Qū) includes all of Datong and most of Shilin in northern Taipei. The district acquired its present boundaries since 2008, when all local constituencies of the Legislative Yuan were reorganized to become single-member districts.

== Current district ==
- Datong
- Shilin: 5 sub-districts
  - Shizi: 10 urban villages
    - Fushun, Fuguang, Hulu, Hudong, Shezi, Shexin, Sheyuan, Yonglun, Fu'an, Fuzhou
  - Hougang: 7 urban villages
    - Hougang, Fuzhong, Giangang, Bailing, Chengde, Fuhua, Mingsheng
  - Jieshang: 7 urban villages
    - Renyong, Yixin, Fude, Fulin, Fuzhi, Jiujia, Fujia
  - Zhishanyan: 4 urban villages
    - Yanshan, Mingshan, Shengshan, Zhishan
  - Yangmingshan: 10 urban villages
    - Dangshan, Yangfu, Gangguan, Xin'an, Yangming, Jingshan, Pingdeng, Xishan, Cuishan, Linxi

== Legislators ==
Representative	Party	Dates	Notes
Justin Chou Shou-hsun	Kuomintang	2008–2012	
Pasuya Yao Wun-chih	Democratic Progressive Party	2012–2018	
Ho Chih-wei	Democratic Progressive Party	2019–2024	
Wang Shih-chien	Democratic Progressive Party	2024-	

== Election results ==
=== 2008 ===
Legislative Election 2008: Taipei City Constituency II
Party	Candidate	Votes	%	±%
Kuomintang	Justin Chou (周守訓)	81,386	52.40	
DPP	Wang Shih-chien (王世堅)	71,119	45.79	
Third Society	Jou Yi-cheng (周奕成)	2,812	1.81	
Majority		10,267	6.61	
Total valid votes		155,317	98.56	
Rejected ballots		2,268	1.44	
Kuomintang win (new seat)				
Turnout		157,585	62.13	
Registered electors		253,636		

=== 2012 ===
Legislative Election 2012: Taipei City Constituency II
Party	Candidate	Votes	%	±%
DPP	Pasuya Yao (姚文智)	99,229	50.05	▲4.26
Kuomintang	Justin Chou (周守訓)	96,119	48.48	▼3.92
People's Democratic Party	Xia Linqing (夏林清)	1,364	0.69	New
People Union Party	Wang Meiwei (王美崴)	1,154	0.58	New
People's Democratic Party	Fu Wenzhong (傅文忠)	405	0.20	New
Majority		3,110	1.57	▼5.04
Total valid votes		198,271	98.79	
Rejected ballots		2,428	1.21	
DPP gain from Kuomintang		Swing	▲4.09	
Turnout		200,699	77.40	▲15.27
Registered electors		259,298		

=== 2016 ===
Legislative Election 2016: Taipei City Constituency II
Party	Candidate	Votes	%	±%
DPP	Pasuya Yao (姚文智)	107,366	59.29	▲9.24
New	Pan Huai-zong (潘懷宗)	65,967	36.43	New
Faith And Hope League	Wu Junde (吳俊德)	3,550	1.96	New
National Health Service Alliance	Lin Xingrong (林幸蓉)	1,561	0.86	New
Independent	Wang Ming-tzong (王銘宗)	1,342	0.74	New
Independence	Chen Mingan (陳民乾)	865	0.48	New
Free Taiwan Party	Chen Jianbin (陳建斌)	433	0.24	New
Majority		41,399	22.86	▲21.29
Total valid votes		181,084	97.76	
Rejected ballots		4,144	2.24	
DPP hold		Swing		
Turnout		185,228	69.00	▼8.40
Registered electors		268,464		

=== 2019 by-election ===
2019 Taipei City Constituency 2 by-election
Party	Candidate	Votes	%	±%
DPP	Ho Chih-wei (何志偉)	38,591	47.76	▼11.53
Kuomintang	Chen Bing-fu (陳炳甫)	31,532	39.03	New
Independent	Chen Si-yu (陳思宇)	9,689	11.99	New
Independent	Wang Yi-kai (王奕凱)	897	1.11	New
National Non-Party Union	Chen Yuan-chi (陳源奇)	89	0.11	New
Majority		7,059	8.73	▼14.13
Total valid votes		80,798	99.62	
Rejected ballots		309	0.38	
DPP hold		Swing		
Turnout		81,107	30.39	▼38.61
Registered electors		266,907		

=== 2020 ===
Legislative Election 2020: Taipei City Constituency II
Party	Candidate	Votes	%	±%
DPP	Ho Chih-wei (何志偉)	123,652	62.87	▲3.58
Kuomintang	Sun Ta-chien (孫大千)	68,667	34.91	New
United Action Alliance	Hsiung Chia-ling (熊嘉玲)	2,360	1.20	New
TAPA	Chen Min-chien (陳民乾)	1,192	0.61	New
Chinese Unification Promotion Party	Kuo Chi-yuan (郭啟源)	418	0.21	New
Interfaith Union	Wu Chao-sheng (巫超勝)	394	0.20	New
Majority		54985	27.96	▲5.10
Total valid votes		196,683	97.30	
Rejected ballots		5,452	2.70	
DPP hold		Swing		
Turnout		202,135	76.15	▲7.15
Registered electors		265,434		

=== 2024 ===
Legislative Election 2024: Taipei City Constituency II
Party	Candidate	Votes	%	±%
DPP	Wang Shih-chien (王世堅)	111,605	60.53	▼2.34
Kuomintang	Yu Shu-hui (游淑慧)	69,754	37.83	▲2.92
The People Union Party	Ho Mei Chuan (何梅娟)	1,741	0.94	New
Institutional Island of Saving the World	Hsiung Chia-ling (熊嘉玲)	968	0.53	New
Chinese Unification Promotion Party	Kuo Chi Yuan (郭啟源)	305	0.17	▼0.04
Majority		41,851	22.70	▼5.26
Total valid votes		184,373	97.51	
Rejected ballots		4,702	2.49	
DPP hold		Swing	▼2.63	
Turnout		189,075	74.20	▼1.95
Registered electors		254,827		
