= Dragon robe =

Everyday dress of East Asian emperors

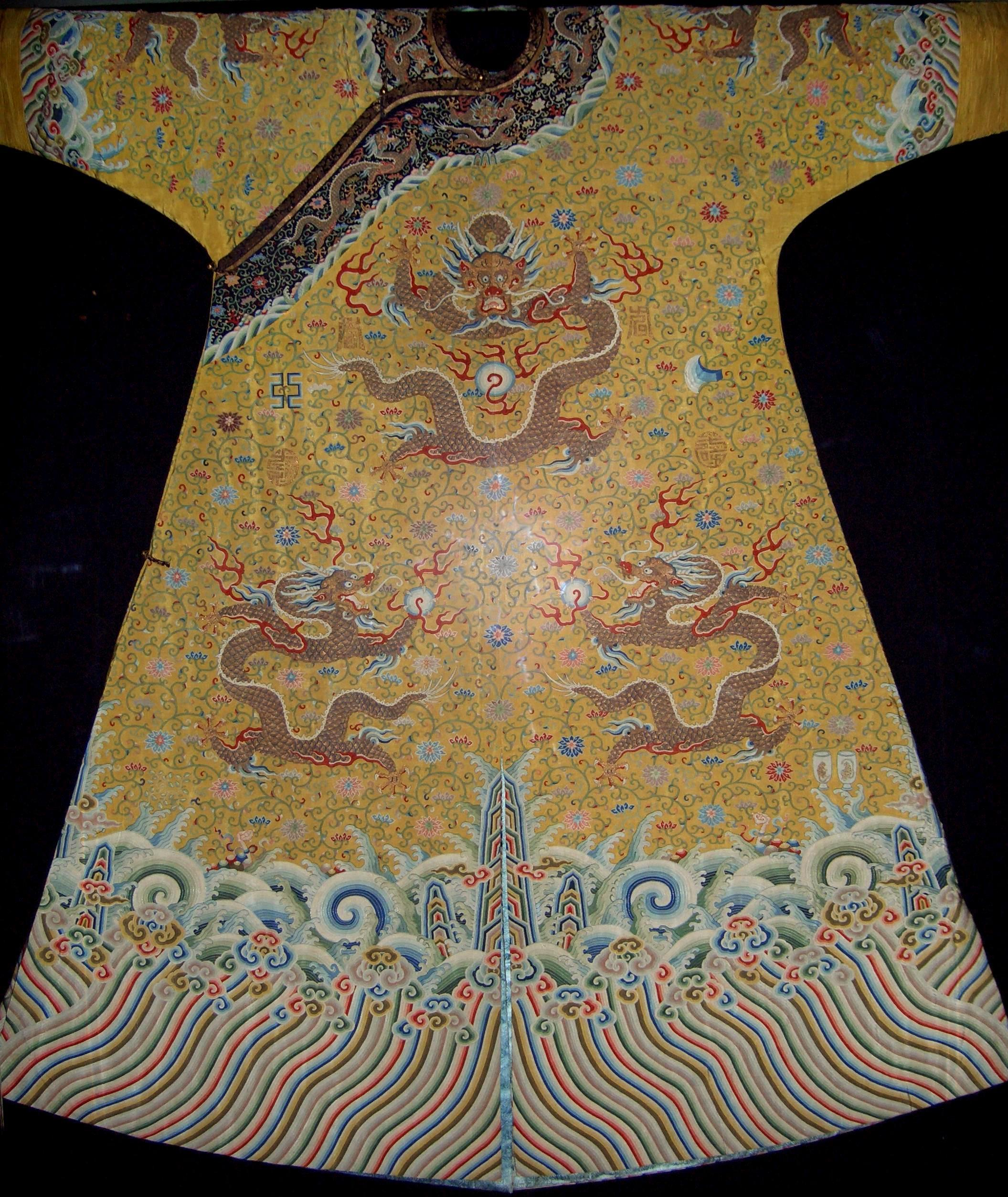
- Dragon robe of Emperor Qianlong

Chinese name
- Traditional Chinese: 袞龍袍
- Simplified Chinese: 袞龙袍
Transcriptions
Standard Mandarin
- Hanyu Pinyin: gǔn lóngpáo

Alternative Chinese name
- Chinese: 龙袍
- Traditional Chinese: 龍袍
Transcriptions
Standard Mandarin
- Hanyu Pinyin: Lóngpáo

Vietnamese name
- Vietnamese alphabet: Long bào
- Chữ Hán: 龍袍

Korean name
- Hangul: 곤룡포
- Hanja: 衮龍袍
Transcriptions
- Revised Romanization: Gollyongpo

Japanese name
- Kanji: 龍袍
Transcriptions
- Romanization: Ryūhō

Dragon robes, also known as gunlongpao (traditional Chinese: 袞龍袍; simplified Chinese: 袞龙袍; pinyin: gǔn lóng páo; Korean: 곤룡포) or longpao for short, is a form of everyday clothing which has a Chinese dragon, called long (龍), as its main decoration. In the past, it was worn by the emperors of China. Dragon robes were also adopted by the rulers of neighbouring countries, such as Korea (Goryeo and Joseon dynasties), Vietnam (Nguyễn dynasty), and the Ryukyu Kingdom.

== Cultural significance ==
Chinese dragons have origins in ancient China. The Chinese dragons have been associated with the emperor of China since ancient times, while the fenghuang is associated with the empress of China. When used on clothing, the Chinese dragons denote the superiority of its wearer or his aspirations. Since the Song, Liao, Jin and Yuan dynasties, the wearing of robes with dragon patterns were forbidden for subjects of the emperor without his authorization.

Since the Ming dynasty, the Chinese dragon is a five-clawed dragon; if it has four claws, it is no more considered as a Chinese dragon but is considered as a Chinese dragon-like creature mang (蟒; 'python'); mang can be found on clothing called mangfu (蟒服; 'mang robe'). According to Shen Defu, "The mang robe is a garment with an image close to a dragon, similar to the dragon robe of the top authority (the emperor), except for the deduction of one claw". Other clothing with four-clawed Chinese dragon-like creatures are feiyufu and douniufu; feiyu and douniu have additional specific characteristics which differ them from both the mang and the long.

== China ==
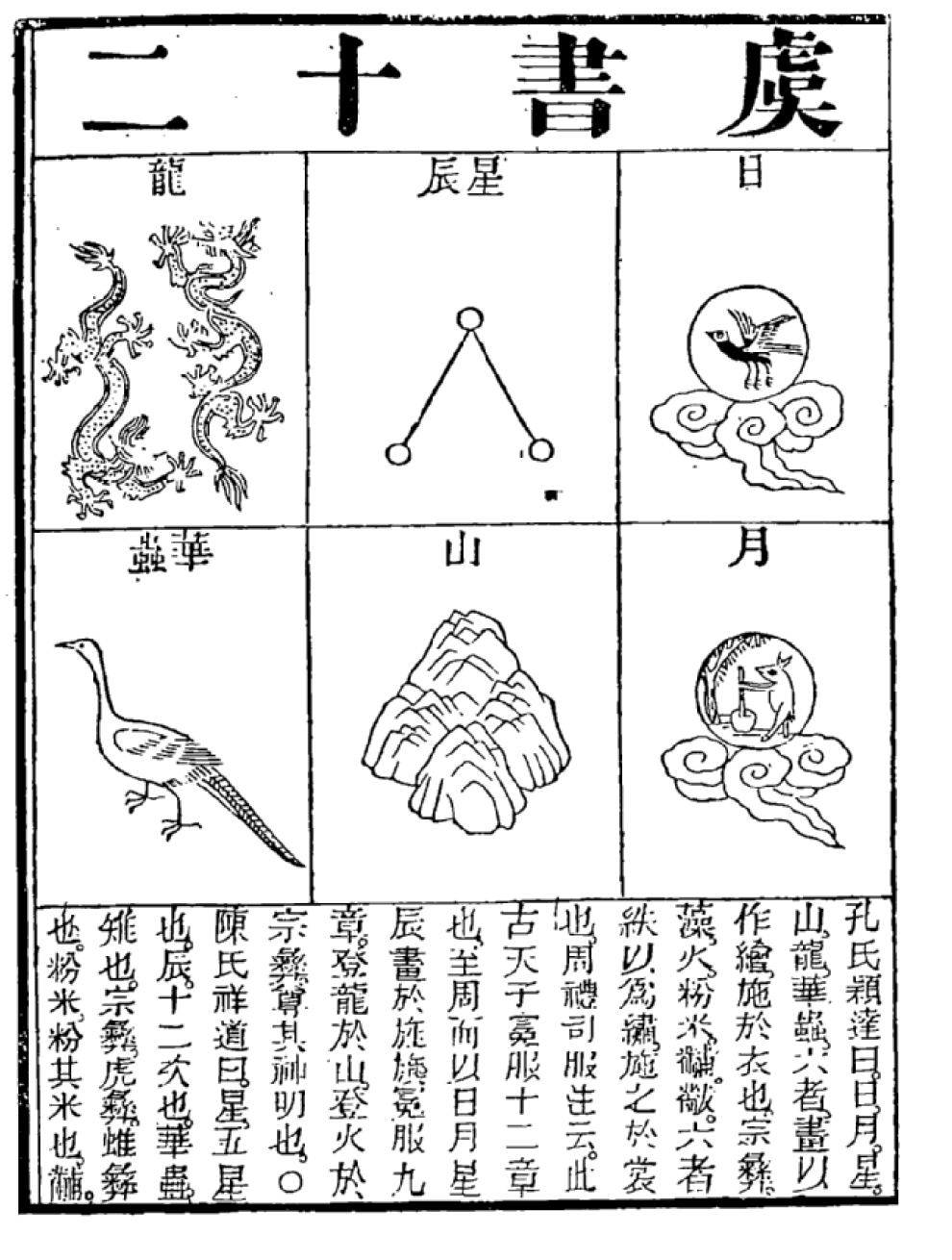
An illustration of the long dragon (one of the 12 ornaments) as documented in the Records of the Grand Historian.

The early use of dragon symbols on imperial robes was documented in the Shangshu, where the use of the number of 12 ornaments (which includes the dragon) allowed to be worn on clothing are regulated according to social ranks. The use of the 12 ornaments on clothing were again specified during the reign of Emperor Xiaoming of the Eastern Han dynasty in 59 AD.

=== Tang and Song dynasties ===
Based on the circular-collar robe, the dragon robe was first adopted by the Tang dynasty (618–906 CE) and was used by the Tang dynasty rulers and senior officials; the circular-collar robe was embellished with dragons to symbolize imperial power. It was documented during the reign of Wu Zetian in 694 AD that she would bestow these robes decorated with (coiled) dragons-with-three-claws to high-ranking officials, i.e. court officials above the third rank, and to princes. The dragon robes were a symbol of power, and it was a great honour to be bestowed dragon robes by the emperor. This practice continued until the Song dynasty.

The Song dynasty eventually made the dragon into the symbol of the emperor. The Song dynasty's emperor's attire, such as the tongtianguanfu, also has dragons as decorative patterns.

In 1111 AD, a decree forbid all subjects of the emperor from wearing dragon patterns, making wearing of dragon robes an exclusive right for the emperor and the empress unless the dragon robes were bestowed to them as a symbol of special favour.

In the arts of the Tang and Song dynasties, the dragons are often depicted with three-claws and horns which curled upwards.

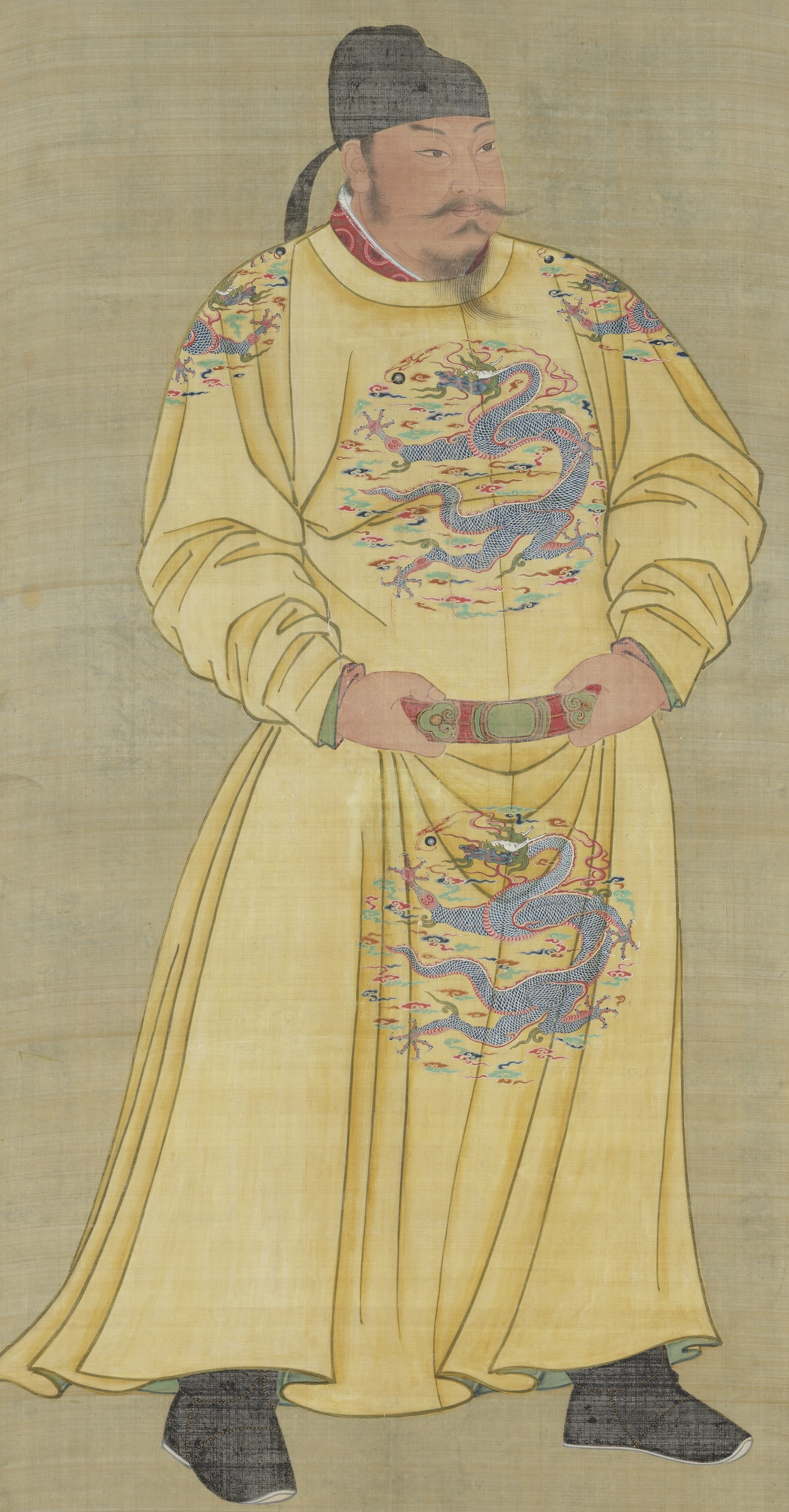
Tang dynasty dragon robe

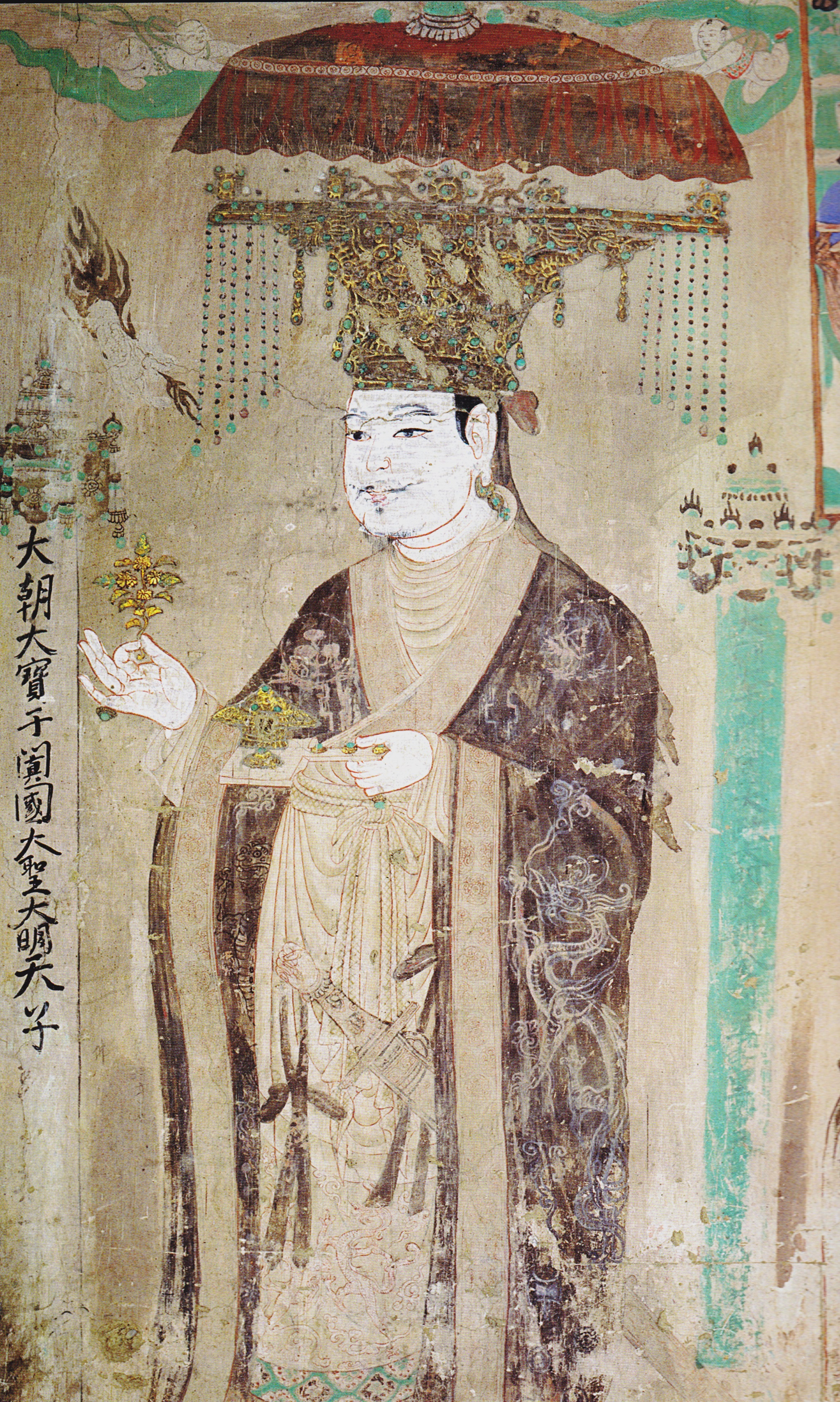
Portrait of a Khotan King wearing Chinese-style dragon robes.

King Yu of Xia, as imagined by Song dynasty painter Ma Lin

King Tang of Shang, as imagined by Song dynasty painter Ma Lin

=== Liao and Jin dynasties ===
Both the rulers of the Liao dynasty and Jurchen-led Jin dynasty adopted dragon roundels on their robes to indicate social status; currently, the oldest archeological artefacts of the dragon robe which has been found so far is dated to the Liao dynasty. The Liao and Jin dynasties both adopted imperial clothing decorated with Song-style dragons.

=== Western Xia dynasty ===
The rulers of the Western Xia also wore a dragon robe with a belt; it was a round-collared gown decorated with dragon roundels.

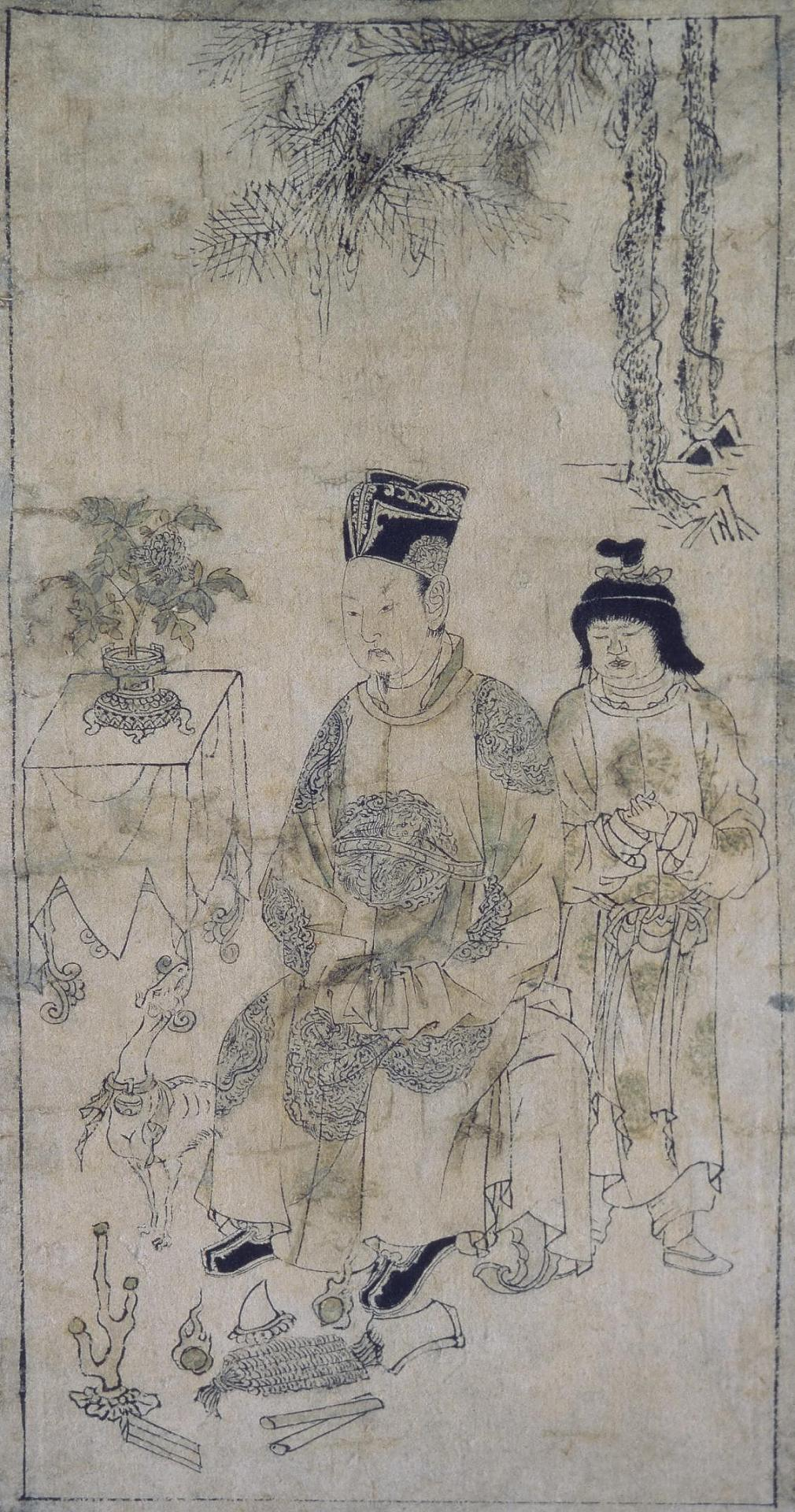
Tangut Emperor of Western Xia wearing a robe with dragon roundels, 13th century

=== Yuan dynasty ===
The Yuan dynasty was the first to codify the use of dragon robes as emblems on court robes. The Imperial family of Yuan used the five-clawed long dragons, which were chasing flaming pearls among clouds. Large dragons with five claws became characteristic features of the emperor's clothing, while smaller dragons with three claws were used for general occasions.

=== Ming dynasty ===
As a result of the use of Dragon robes in the Yuan, the subsequent Ming emperors shunned them on formal occasions.

Since the Ming dynasty, the Chinese dragons have five claws. However, only royals could wear five-clawed dragons, honoured officials could be granted the privilege of wearing robes with dragon-like creatures, such as mangfu (dragon-like creature with four-clawed), feiyufu (the feiyu, "Flying-fish", a creature with four claws, fin-like wings on the torso, and a fish-looking tail) and the douniu (Dipper capricorn; a creature which can have 3 or 4 claws; water buffalo-like horns). The mangfu, feiyu and douniu robes were strictly regulated by the Ming court.

In the early Ming, the Ming court retained the decorative schemes of the Yuan dynasty for their own dragon robes; however, Ming designers also modified the Yuan dynasty's dragon robe and personalized it by adding "waves breaking against rocks along the lower edges of the decorative areas". The Ming dynasty's dragon robe had a large dragon on the back and chest area of the robe and dragons which were placed horizontally on the skirt, wide sleeves.

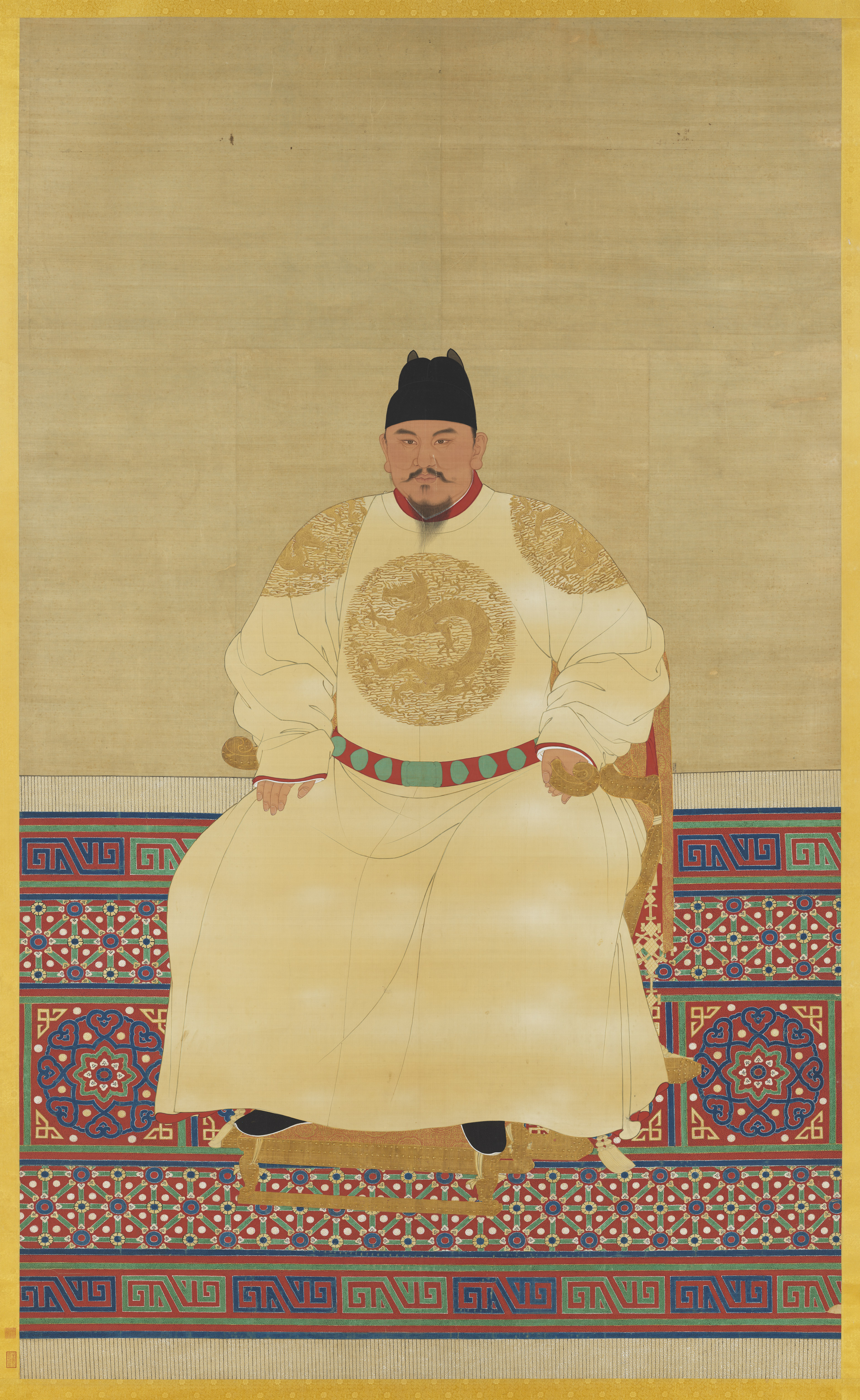
The dragon robe for daily wear of Ming dynasty

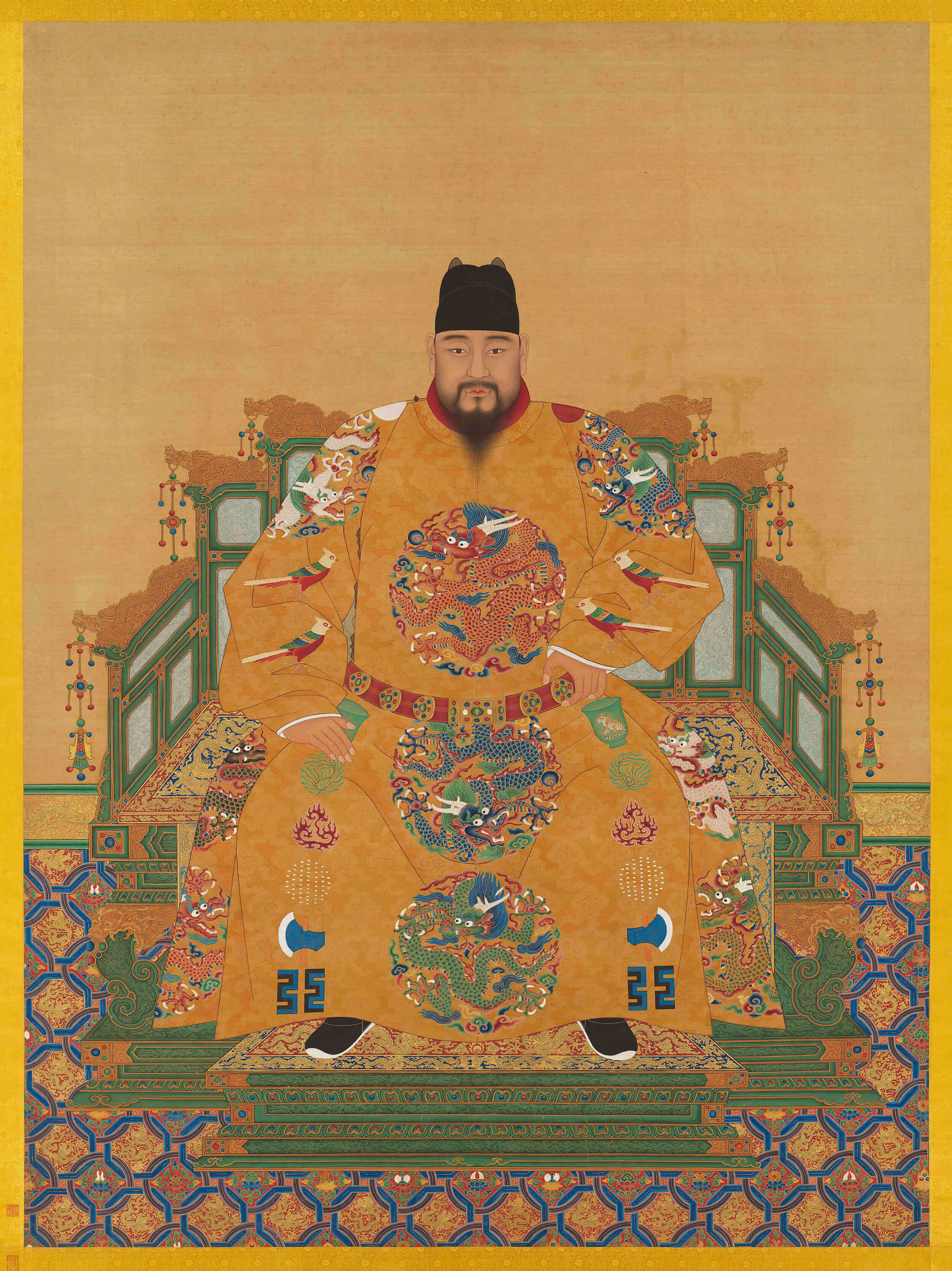

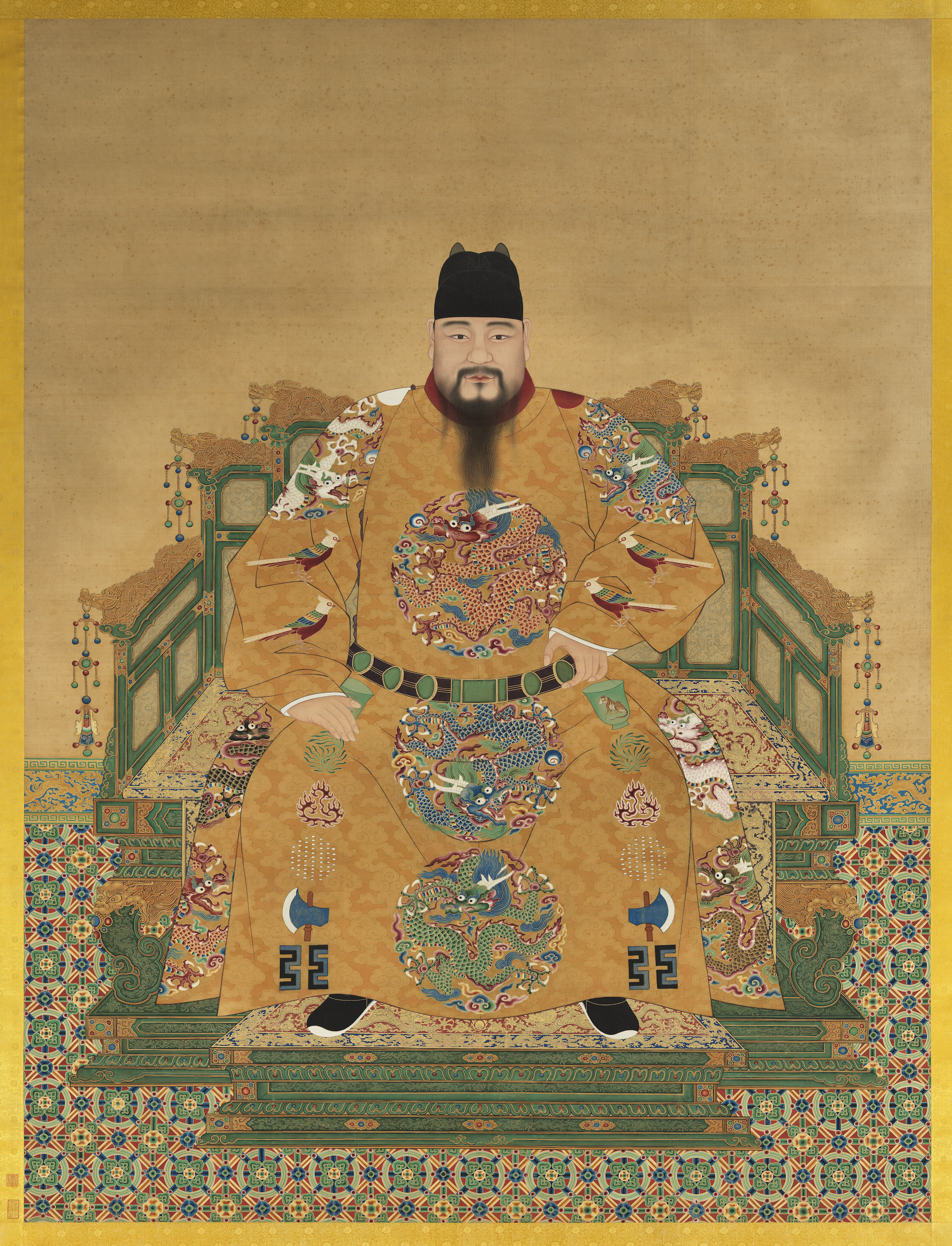

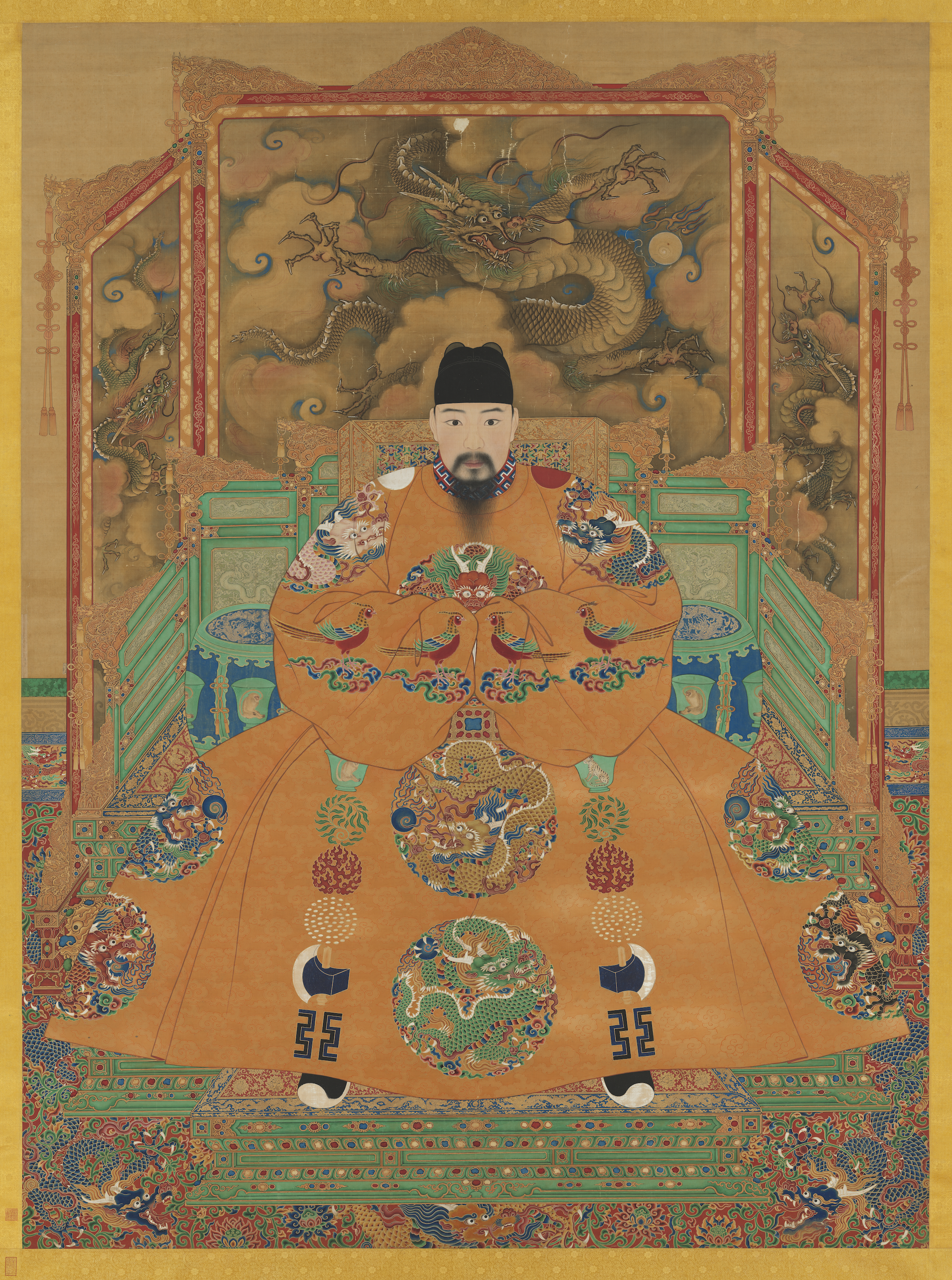

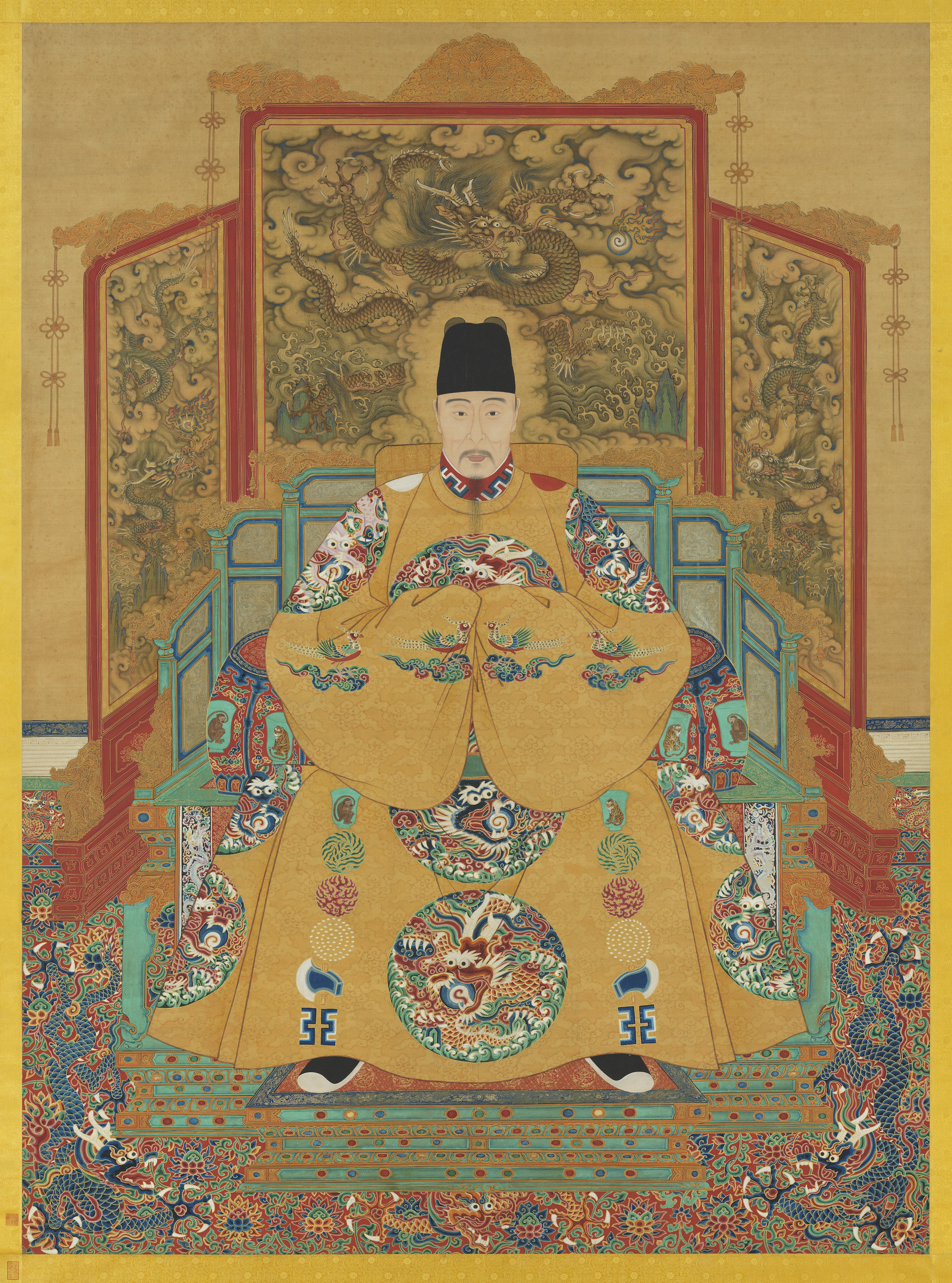
The dragon robe for special occasions of Ming dynasty

=== Qing dynasty ===
In the Qing dynasty, the longpao can only be referred as such when it involves the clothing of the emperor, their consorts, and the crown prince; the lonpao was typically decorated with the five-clawed dragons along with the 12 auspicious symbols depending on the wearer's rank. There are different types of robes decorated with Chinese dragon in the Qing dynasty: including jifu ("auspicious robe", a semi-formal court robe, which was worn during special and important occasions), chaofu (朝服; 'audience robe'), the most formal robe of the Qing dynasty court, and changfu.

The Qing dynasty inherited the dragon robes of the Ming dynasty. The early Manchus originally did not weave their own textiles, and the Manchus had to obtain Ming dragon robes and cloth when they paid tribute or traded with the Ming dynasty. In 1636, the dress code elaborated by the Manchu allowed the emperor and the first-rank princes to wear yellow robes with five-clawed dragons.

At the time of Hong Taiji, the first emperor of Qing did not want to be solely dressed in the clothing of the Han Chinese and wanted to maintain the Manchu ethnic identity, even in terms of clothing. He also rejected the use of Twelve Ancient Symbols of Imperial Authority which used to adorn the ceremonial and ritual robes of the previous Chinese emperors since the Zhou dynasty. The Ming dynasty dragon robes were therefore modified, cut and tailored to be narrow at the sleeves and waist with slits in the skirt to make it suitable for falconry, horse riding and archery. The Ming dynasty dragon robes were simply modified and changed by Manchus to fit their Manchu tastes by cutting it at the sleeves and waist to make them narrow around the arms and waist instead of wide and added a new narrow cuff to the sleeves. The new cuff was made out of fur. The robe's jacket waist had a new strip of scrap cloth put on the waist while the waist was made snug by pleating the top of the skirt on the robe. The Manchus added sable fur skirts, cuffs and collars to Ming dragon robes and trimming sable fur all over them before wearing them.

By the end of the seventeenth century AD, the Qing court decided to re-design the dragon robes of the Ming dynasty, and from the early eighteenth century, the Qing court has established a dragon robe with 9 dragons, wherein 4 dragons would radiate from the neck on the chest, back and shoulders to symbolize the cardinal direction, 4 dragons were found on the skirts – 2 on the back and 2 on the front of the skirt respectively, with the last dragon (9th) hidden placed on the inner flap of the gown.

In the 1730s, the Qianlong emperor started to wear the sun and moon symbols; both were part of Twelve Ancient Symbols of Imperial Authority.

Through the Huangchao liqi tushi decree, all the Twelve Ancient Symbols of Imperial Authority (which were ironically initially rejected by the first Qing emperor) were eventually added on the emperor's dragon robes by the year 1759. According to the Huangchao liqi tushi, Emperor Qianlong's winter court robe worn on the day court audience was bright yellow; it was decorated with the twelve symbols and was decorated with green ocean dragons on the sleeves and collar, the skirt had five moving dragons, the lapel was decorated by one dragon and the pleats had nine dragons; the skirt has two dragons and four moving dragons and the broad collar has two moving dragons and the each sleeve cuffs have 1 dragon. In the 1759 decree, the use of the five-clawed dragons were also restricted to the usage of the imperial family, i.e. the emperors, the emperor's sons, and the princes of the first and second ranks. Minghuang (bright yellow) dragon robes was only worn by the emperor and the empress; the sons of the Qing emperors were allowed to wear other shades of yellow, for examples: "apricot yellow" for the Crown prince, "golden yellow" for the imperial princes and for the other wives of the emperor; other princes and members of the Aisin Gioro clan were required to wear blue or blue-black robes.

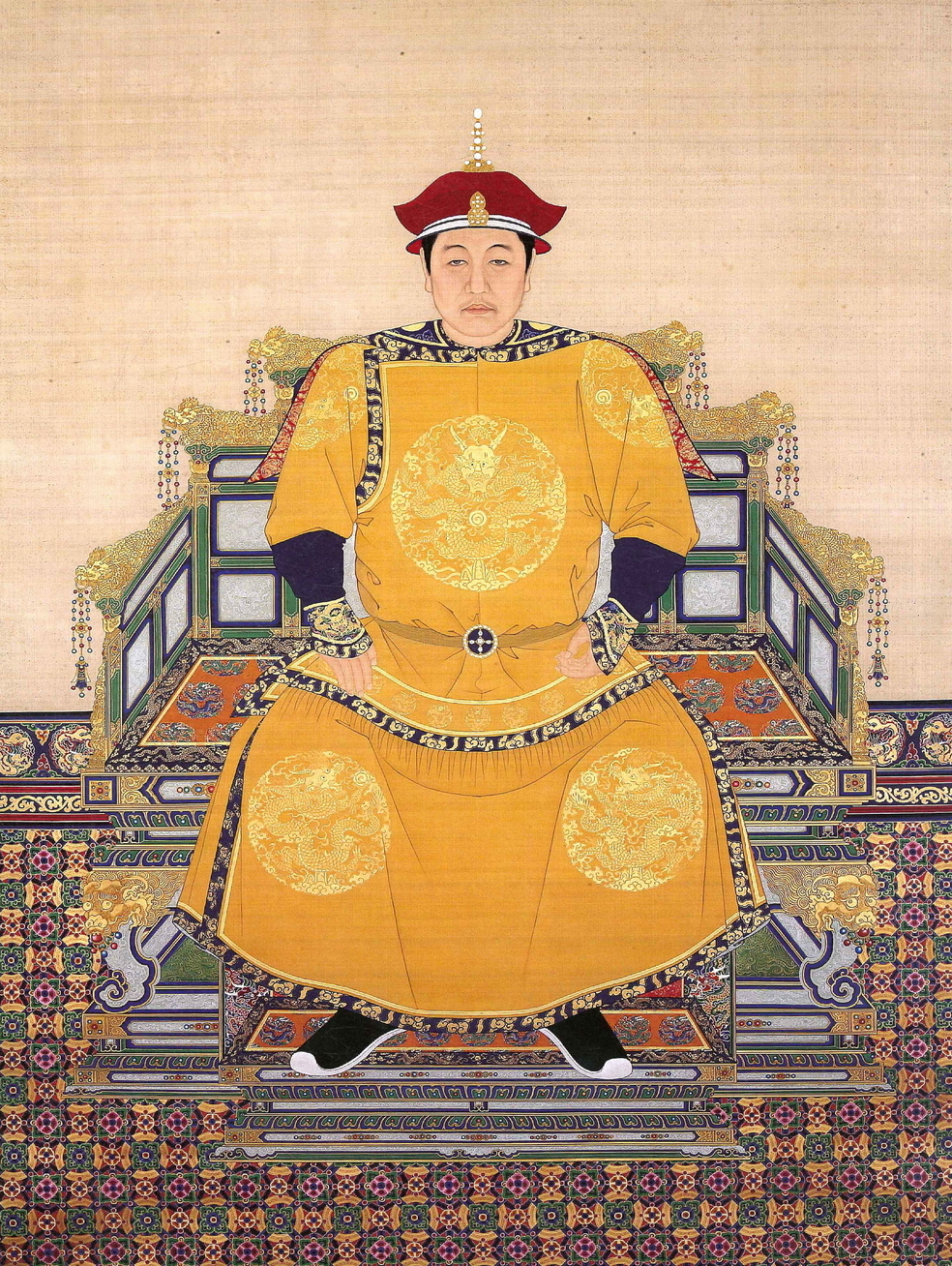
The dragon robe for special occasions of Qing dynasty

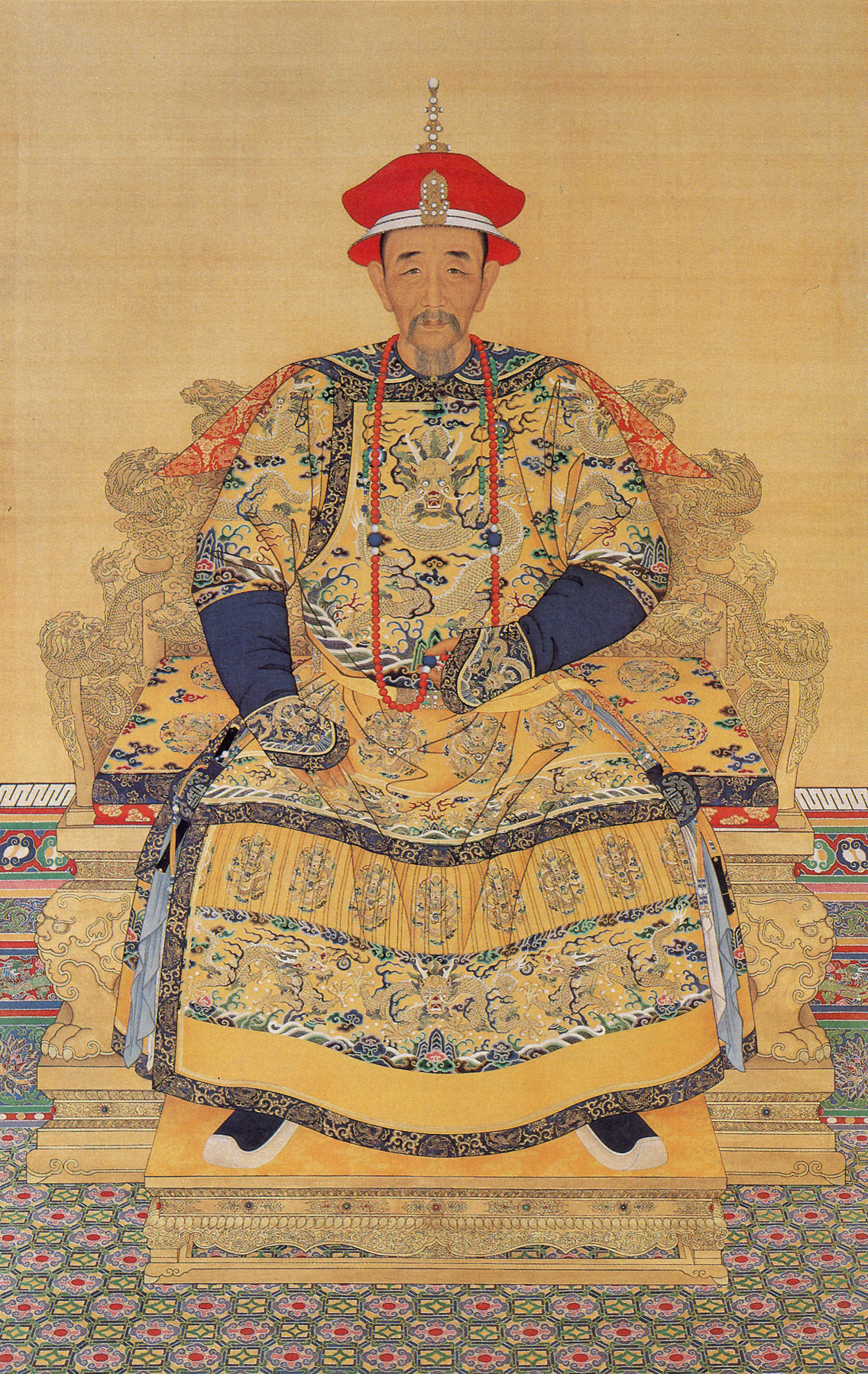
Dragon robe of the Qing dynasty for daily wear

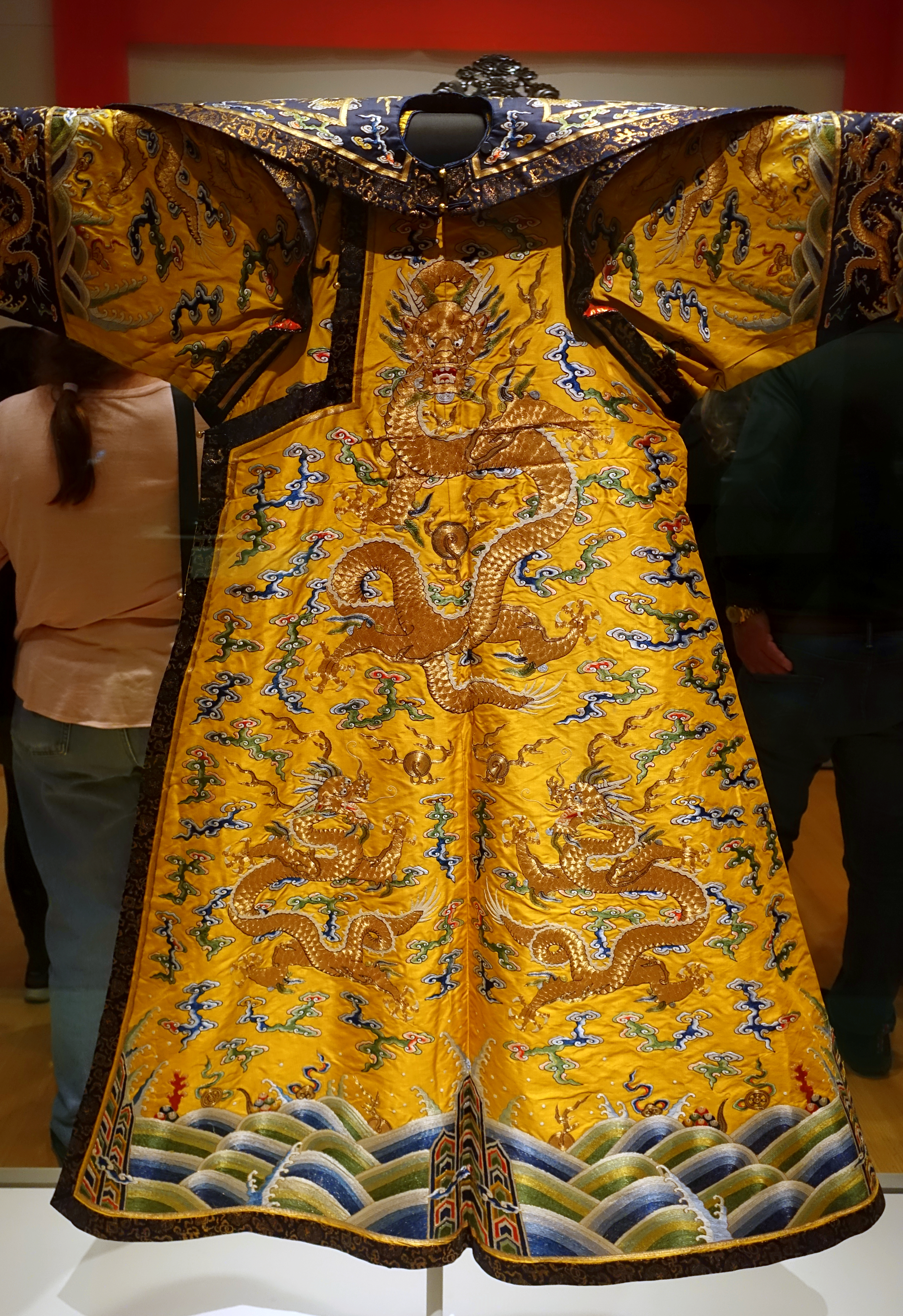
Court robe with dragons and clouds, 1723-1735 AD

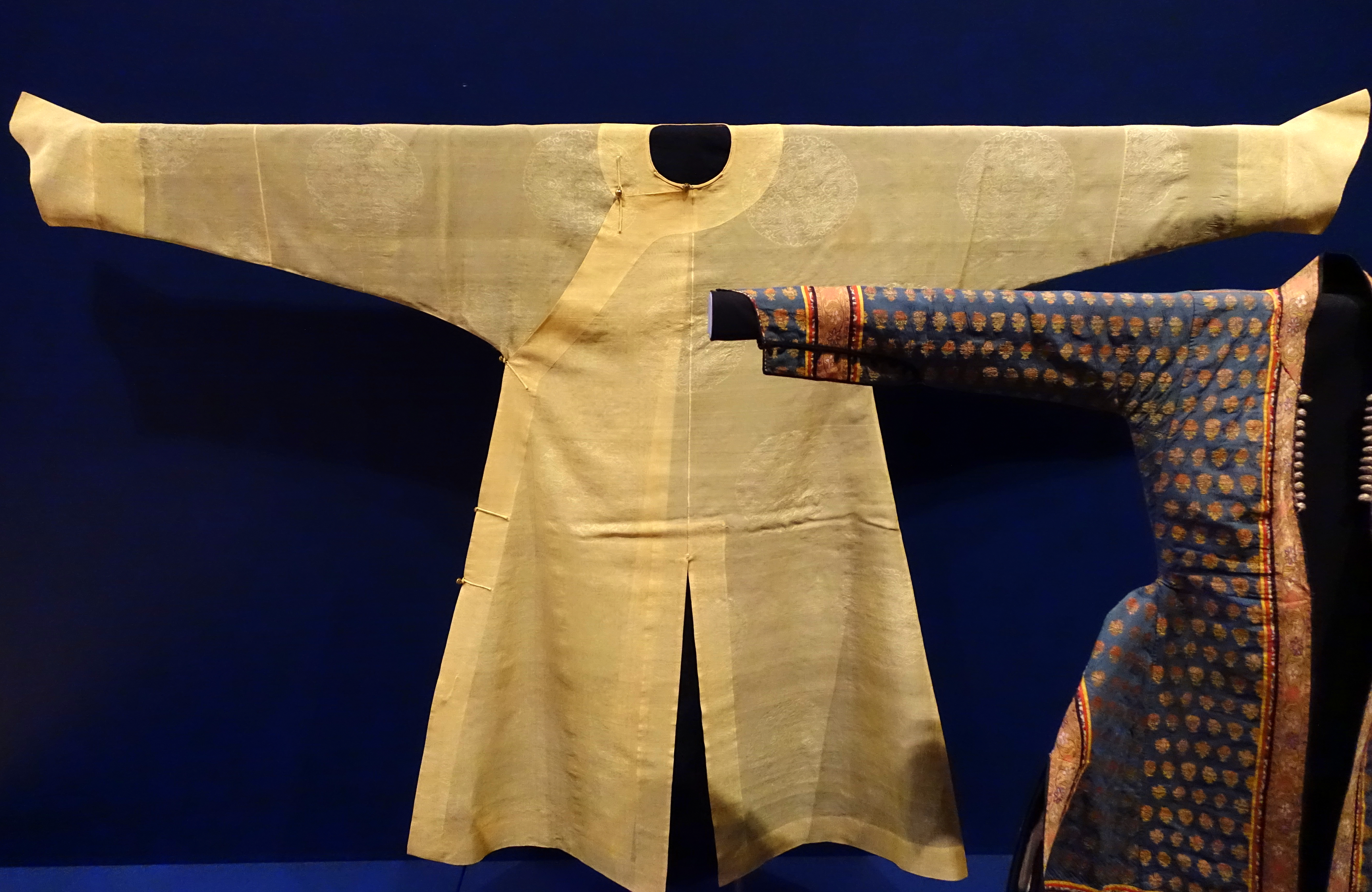
Changfu with dragon roundels, 1850-1861 AD

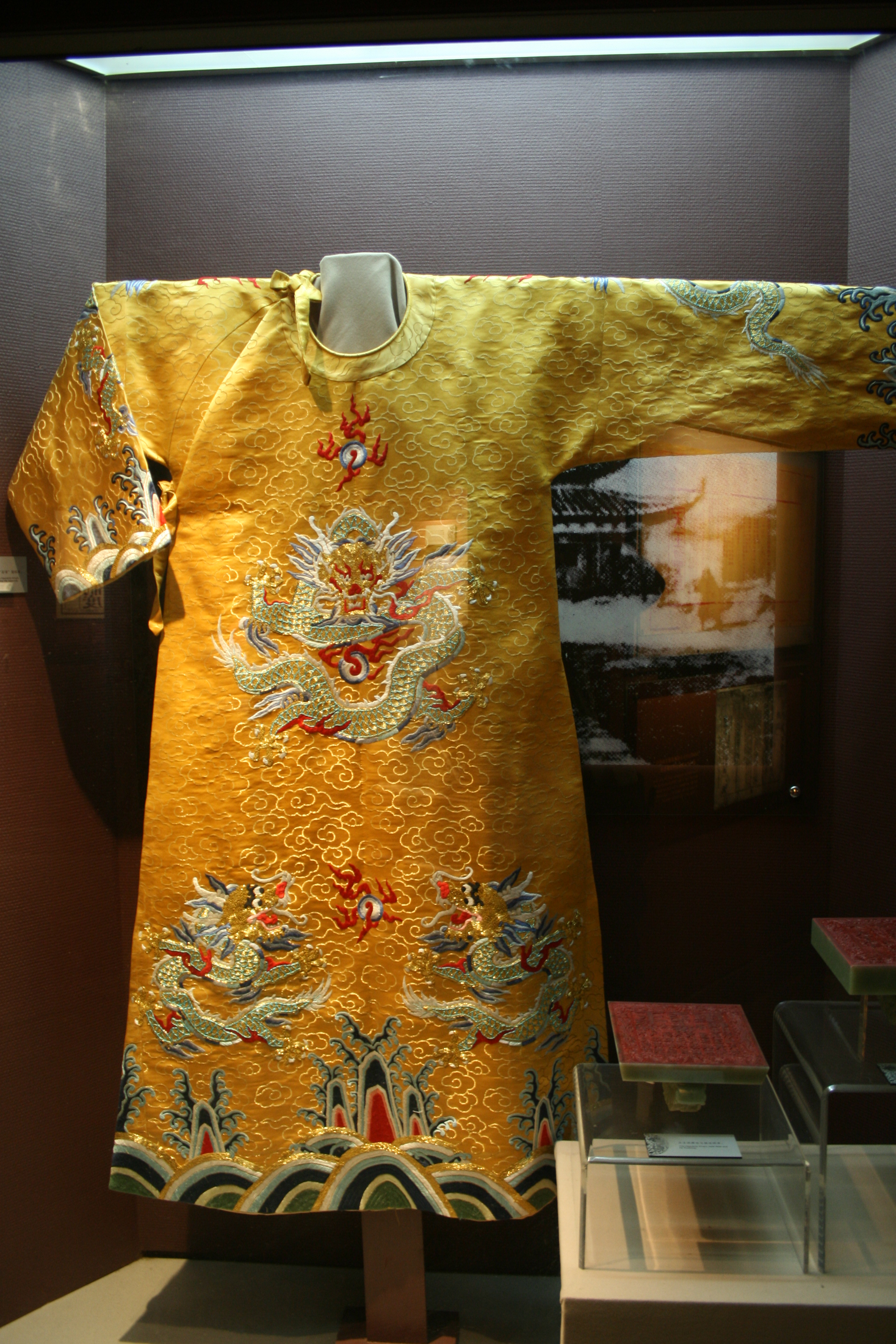
Hong Xiuquan's Silk Dragon Robe

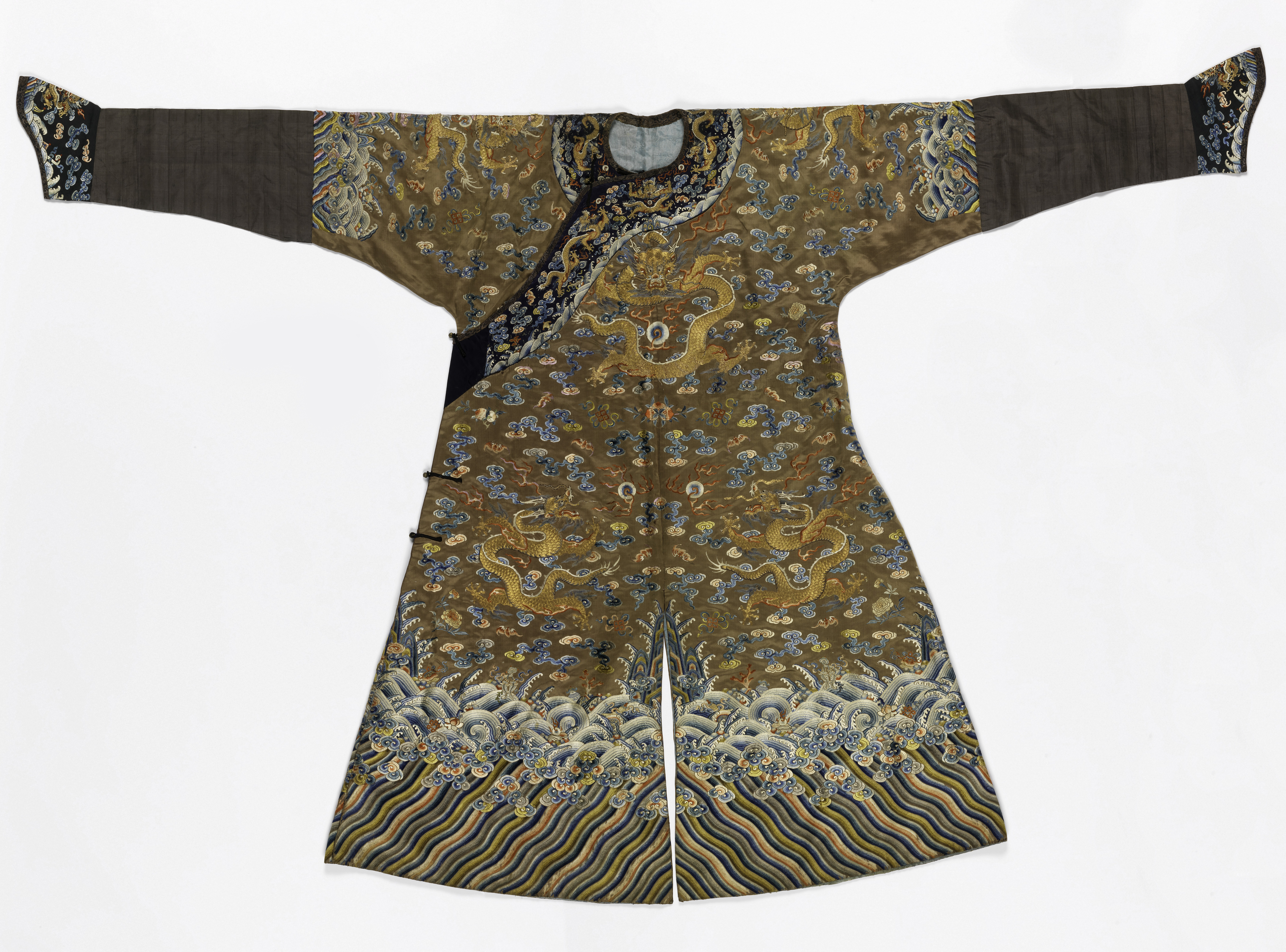
Dragon robe, 1796–1820

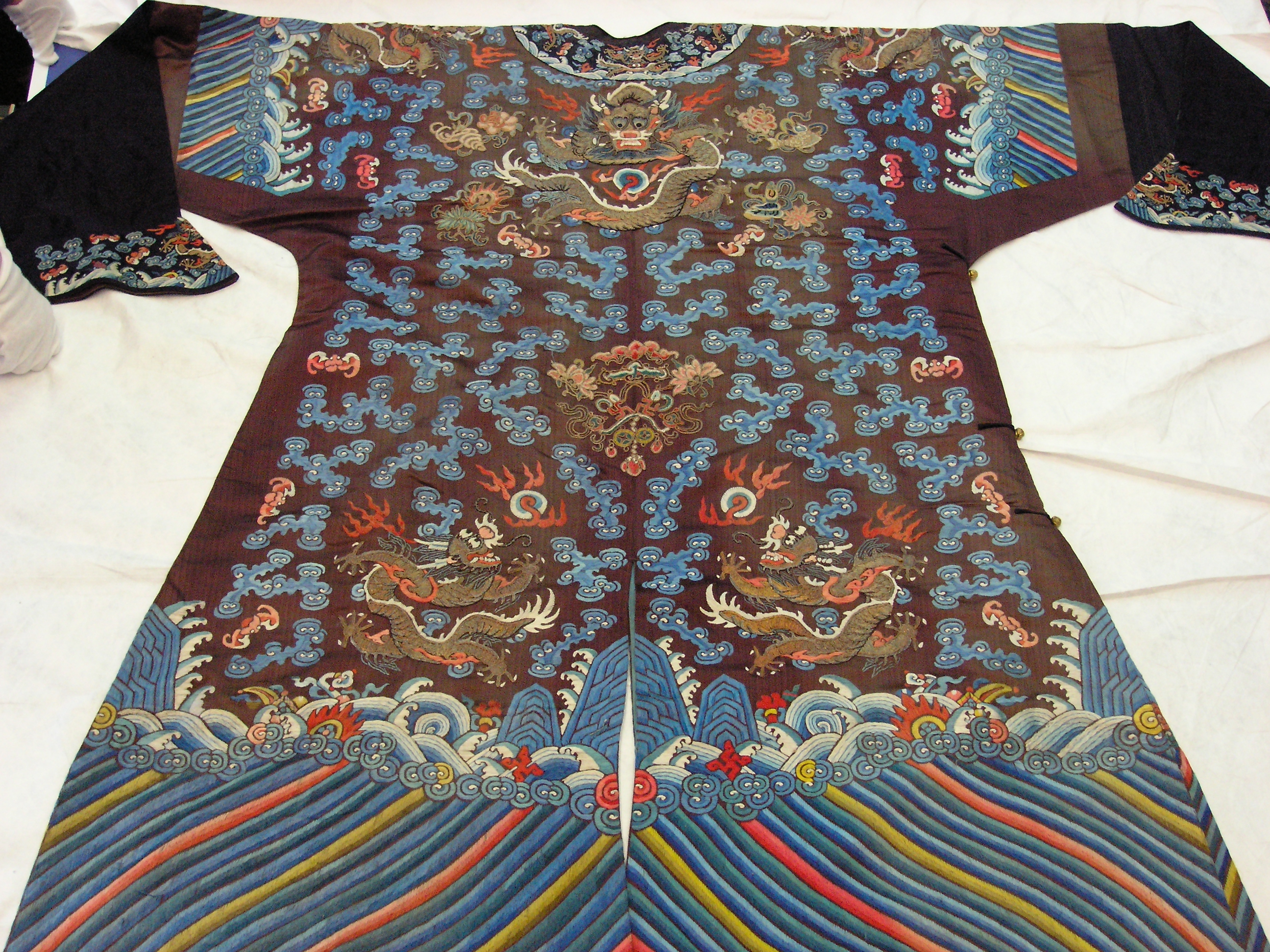
Chinese dragon's robe (jifu)

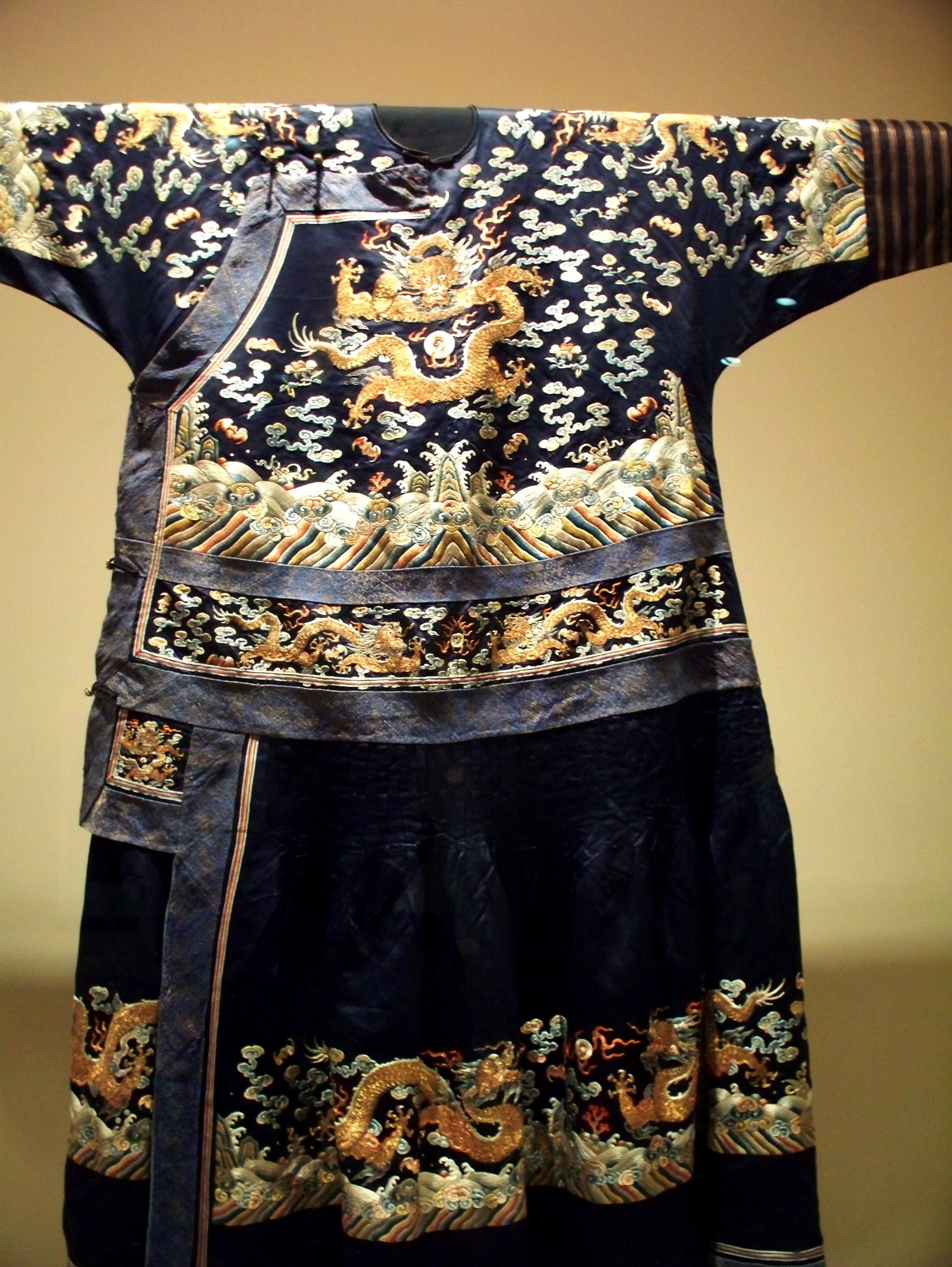
Chaofu

==== Dragon robes of Han Chinese ====
The Spencer Museum of Art has six longpao robes that belonged to Han Chinese nobility of the Qing dynasty. Ranked officials and Han Chinese nobles had two slits in the skirts while Manchu nobles and the Imperial family had four slits in skirts: All first, second and third rank officials (as well as Han Chinese and Manchu nobles) were entitled to wear nine dragons by the Qing Illustrated Precedents of 1759. Qing sumptuary laws only allowed four-clawed dragons (Mang) for officials, Han Chinese nobles, and Manchu nobles while the Qing Imperial family, emperor and princes up to the second degree and their female family members were entitled to wear five clawed dragons. However officials violated these laws all the time and wore 5 clawed dragons and the Spencer Museum's 6 longpao worn by Han Chinese nobles have 5 clawed dragons on them.

== Misconceptions on Qing court clothing development ==
It was mistakenly thought that the hunting ancestors of the Manchus skin clothes became Qing dynasty clothing, due to the contrast between Ming dynasty clothes unshaped cloth's straight length contrasting to the odd-shaped pieces of Qing dynasty longpao (lit. "dragon robe") and chaofu . Scholars from the west wrongly assumed that those clothing were purely Manchu as the early Manchu rulers wrote several edicts stressing on maintaining their traditions and clothing. Qing unofficial clothes, longpao, share similar features with the Yuan dynasty clothing while Qing official clothing, chaofu, shares similarities with the Ming dynasty chaofu-like clothing. The Ming consciously modelled their clothing after that of earlier Han Chinese dynasties like the Song dynasty, Tang dynasty and Han dynasty.

Han Chinese court costume was also modified by Manchus by adding a ceremonial big collar (daling) or shawl collar (pijianling).

=== Chaofu ===
The Manchu element on the Qing chaofu (朝服) can be seen from the slim-fitting sleeves and horse-hoof-shaped cuffs, which are the vestiges of the Manchu clothing worn when people were hunting in cold weather. The first prototype of the chaofu was actually the Mongol terlig of the Yuan dynasty; the Mongol terlig of the Yuan continued to develop in the succeeding Ming and Qing dynasties developing their own respective characteristics. However, the Qing dynasty chaofu was also a Manchu adaptation of the Han Chinese court dress; the adaptations of the clothing were formalized in 1759.

Chaofu-like robes from Ming dynasty tombs (e.g. the Wanli emperor's tomb) were excavated and it was found that Qing chaofu was similar in structure. They had embroidered or woven dragon-like creatures on them but are different from longpao dragon robes which are a separate clothing. As they have dragon-looking creature on them, those clothing are called "dragon robe" in the excavation reports; however they are not the same longpao found in the succeeding Qing dynasty. Ming-dynasty chaofu-like clothing had flared or pleated skirt with right side fastenings and fitted bodices dragon robes have been found in Beijing, Shanxi, Jiangxi, Jiangsu and Shandong tombs of Ming officials and Ming imperial family members. Similarly to the earlier Ming chaofu-like clothing which uses sleeve extensions (i.e. another piece of cloth attached to the bodice's integral upper sleeve), the later Qing dynasty chaofu also shares the same feature.

Following the founding of the Ming dynasty, the Ming rulers consciously modelled their clothing after that of earlier Han Chinese dynasties like the Song dynasty, Tang dynasty and Han dynasty. These Ming chaofu-like clothing shared similarities with the Tang dynasty banbi which were found in Todaiji temple's Shosoin repository in terms of construction (such as cross-collar) but not in terms of decoration; however, they also differ from each other in some features. The Qing chaofu may also have been derived from the Tang dynasty banbi; the Tang dynasty banbi also uses different fabric with different patterns on the banbi's ran (a form of skirt attached to the bodice) and the bodice.

Moreover, Han dynasty and Jin dynasty (266–420) era tombs in Yingban, to the Tianshan mountains south in Xinjiang have clothes resembling the Qing long pao and Tang dynasty banbi. Therefore, there is evidence from excavated tombs indicates that China had a long tradition of garments that led to the Qing chaofu, and it was not invented or introduced by Manchus in the Qing dynasty or Mongols in the Yuan dynasty. The Ming robes that the Qing chaofu derived from were just not used in portraits and official paintings but were deemed as high status to be buried in tombs. In some cases the Qing went further than the Ming dynasty in imitating ancient China to display legitimacy with resurrecting ancient Chinese rituals to claim the Mandate of Heaven after studying Chinese classics. Qing sacrificial ritual vessels deliberately resemble ancient Chinese ones even more than Ming vessels. Tungusic people on the Amur river like Udeghe, Ulchi and Nanai adopted Chinese influences in their religion and clothing with Chinese dragons on ceremonial robes, scroll and spiral bird and monster mask designs, Chinese New Year, using silk and cotton, iron cooking pots, and heated house from China.

The Qing dynasty chaofu appear in official formal portraits while these Ming dynasty Chaofu-like clothing that they derive from do not, perhaps indicating the Ming officials and imperial family wore chaofu under their formal robes since they appear in Ming tombs but not portraits.

=== Longpao ===
The Qing dynasty longpao resembles Yuan dynasty clothing like robes found in the Shandong Yuan dynasty tomb of Li Youan. The Yuan robes had hems flared and around the arms and torso they were tight. Qing unofficial clothes, longpao, share similar features with the Yuan dynasty clothing while Qing official clothing, chaofu, derived from Ming dynasty chaofu-like clothing.

== Influences and derivatives ==
=== Tibet ===
The Qing emperor also bestowed five-clawed dragon robes to the Dalai Lama, the Panchen lama, and the Jebtsundamba khutukhtu of Urga, which were the three most prominent dignitaries of Tibetan Buddhism. Court robes were often sent from China to Tibet in the 18th century where they were redesigned in the clothing style worn by lay aristocrats; these Chinese textiles held great value in Tibet at that time as some of these aristocratic chuba could be re-sewn from many different pieces of robes. Only nobles and high lamas were allowed to wear dragon robes in Tibet.

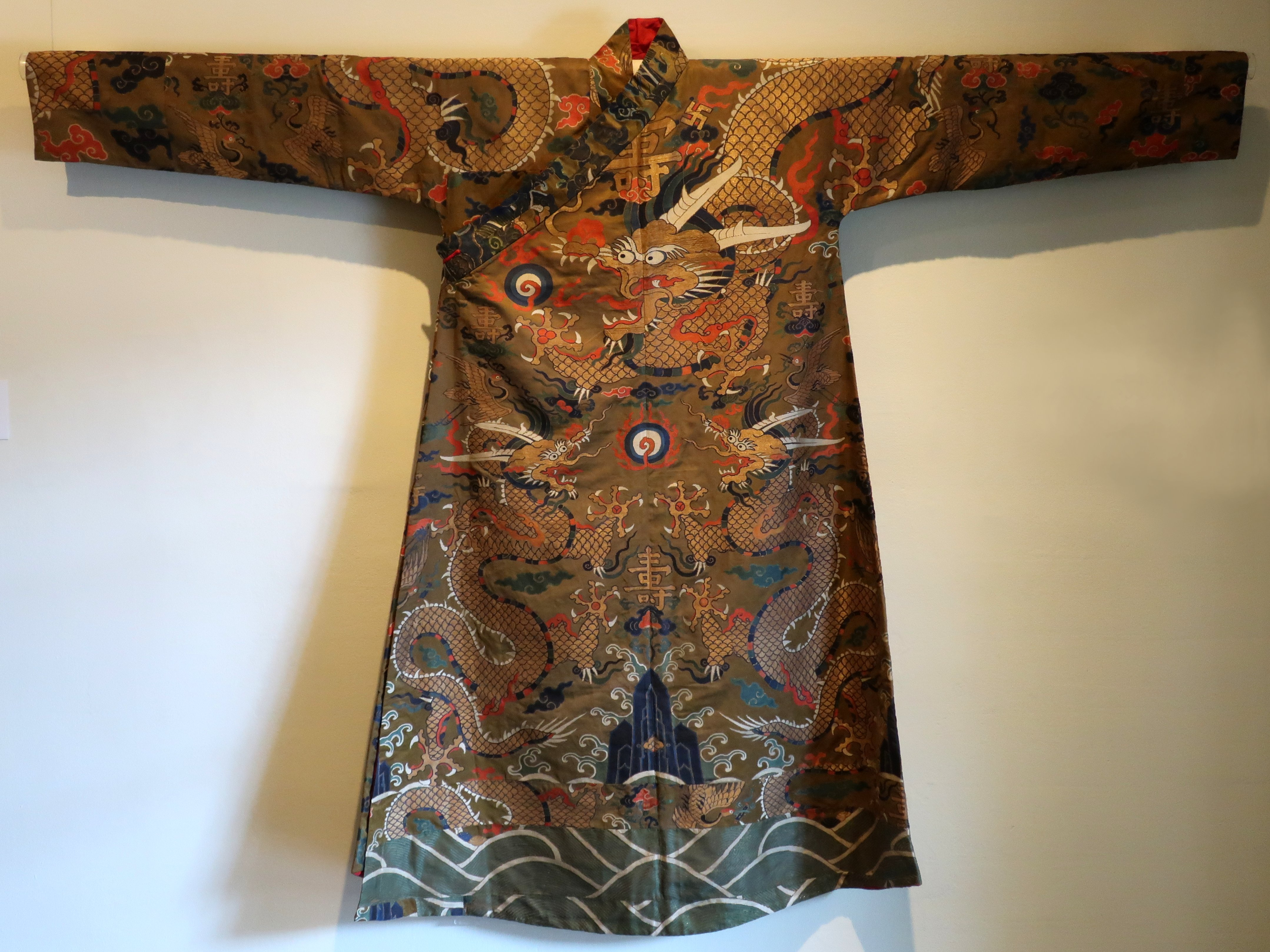
Chuba (dragon robe) made in Tibet

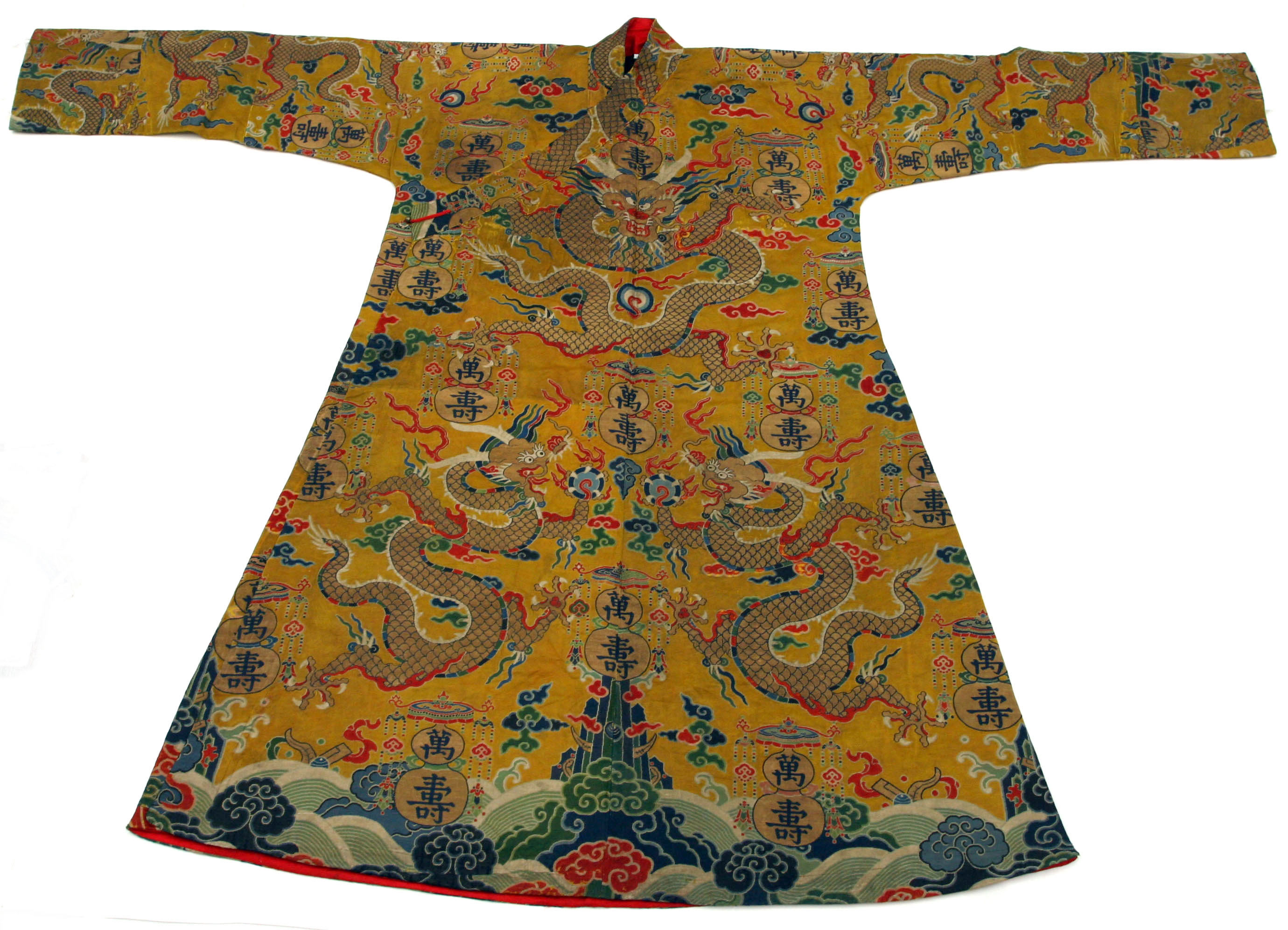
Lay Aristocrat's Robe (Chuba), 18th–19th century, Tibet.

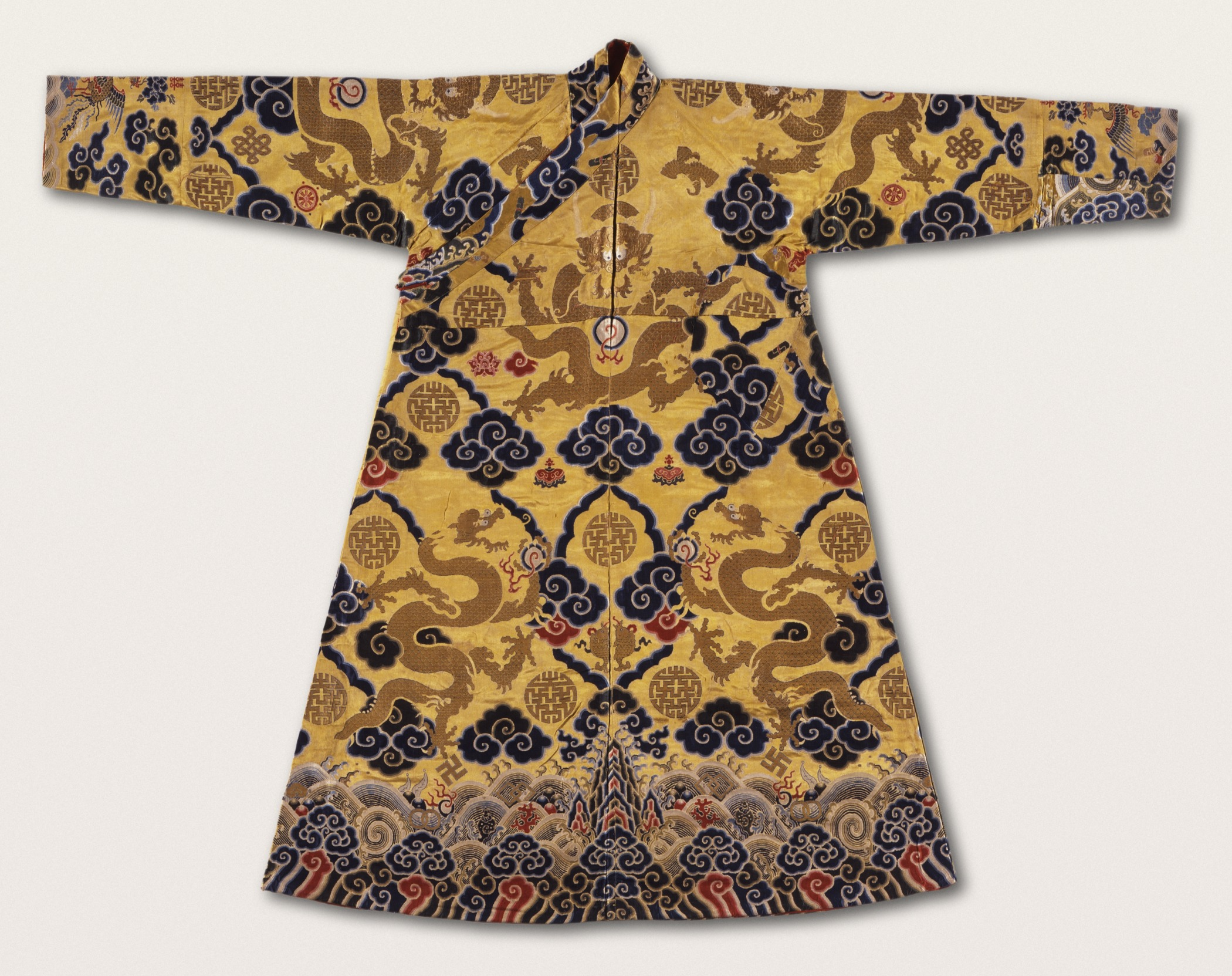
Man's Ceremonial Robe (chuba)

=== Mongol tribes ===
The Qing emperors bestowed dragons robes on Mongol nobles who were under Qing dynasty control; the Qing dressed code was applied to the Mongol nobility from the year 1661.

=== Korea ===
Korean kingdoms of Silla and Balhae first adopted the circular-collar robe, dallyeong, from Tang dynasty of China in the North-South States Period for use as formal attires for royalty and government officials.

According to the Goryeosa, since 1043 AD, the Song, Liao, and Jin emperors have bestowed imperial clothing to Goryeo. The kings of the Goryeo dynasty initially used yellow dragon robes, sharing similar clothing style as the Chinese. In 1043, the king of Goryeo forbid his subjects from wearing robes with brocaded or embroidered dragons and phoenixes.

After Goryeo was subjugated by the Yuan dynasty of China (1271–1368 AD), the Goryeo kings, the royal court, and the government had several titles and privileges downgraded to the point that they were no more the equals of the Yuan emperors. The Goryeo kings were themselves demoted from the traditional status of imperial ruler of a kingdoms to the status of a lower rank king of a vassal state; as such they were forbidden from wearing the yellow dragon robes as it was reserved for the Yuan emperors. At that time, they had to wear a purple robe instead of a yellow one. Goryeo kings at that time sometimes used the Mongol attire instead; several Mongol clothing elements were adopted in the clothing of Goryeo. After the fall of Yuan dynasty in 1368, the rulers of Goryeo finally got the chance to regain their former Pre-Yuan dynasty status. However, Goryeo was soon replaced by the Joseon dynasty in 1392.

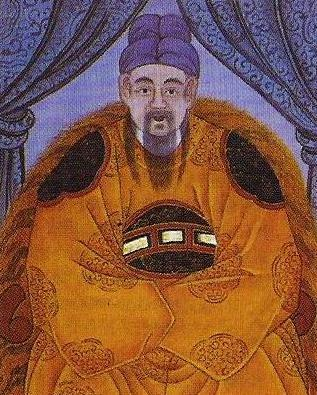
King Gongmin of Goryeo, r. 1351–1374 AD.

Joseon dynasty once again adopted the style from Ming dynasty of China, then known in China as hwangnyongpo (Korean: 황룡포; Hanja: 黃龍袍), as gonryongpo. It was introduced for the first time in 1444 from the Ming dynasty during the reign of King Sejong. Joseon dynasty ideologically submitted itself to Ming dynasty of China as a tributary state, and thus used red goryeonpo was used in accordance to China's policy of wearing clothing which were two levels lower. The red goryeongpo was used instead of yellow for its dragon robes, as yellow symbolized the emperor and red symbolized the king. After the fall of the Ming dynasty, the robe became a Korean custom by integrating unique Korean style into its design. It is only when Emperor Gojong proclaimed himself as emperor in 1897 that the colour of the goryeopo changed from red to yellow to be of the same colour as the emperor of China. Only Emperor Gojong and Emperor Sunjong were able to wear the yellow goryeonpo.

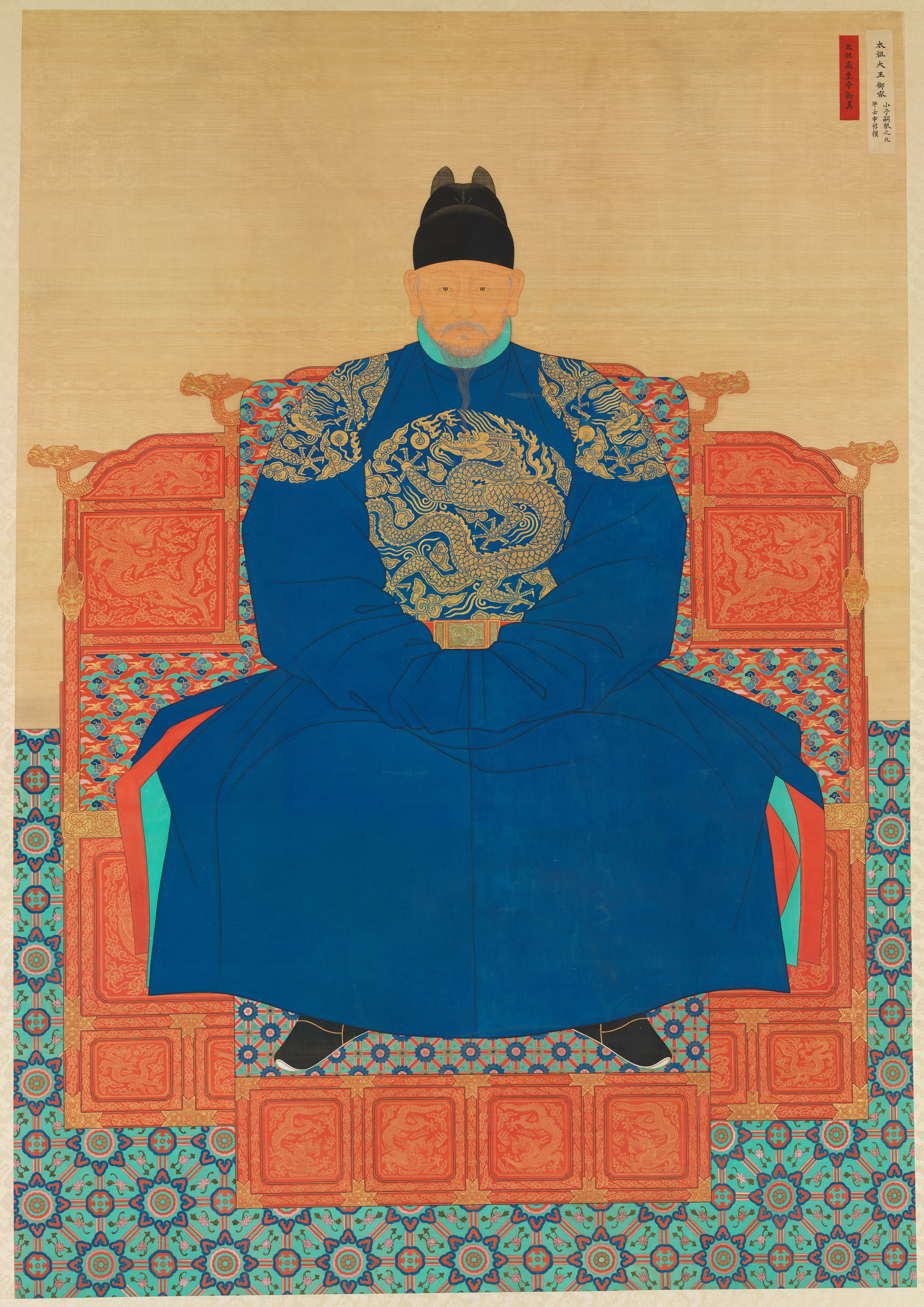
Taejo of Joseon's Gonryongpo

Yeongjo of Joseon's Gonryongpo

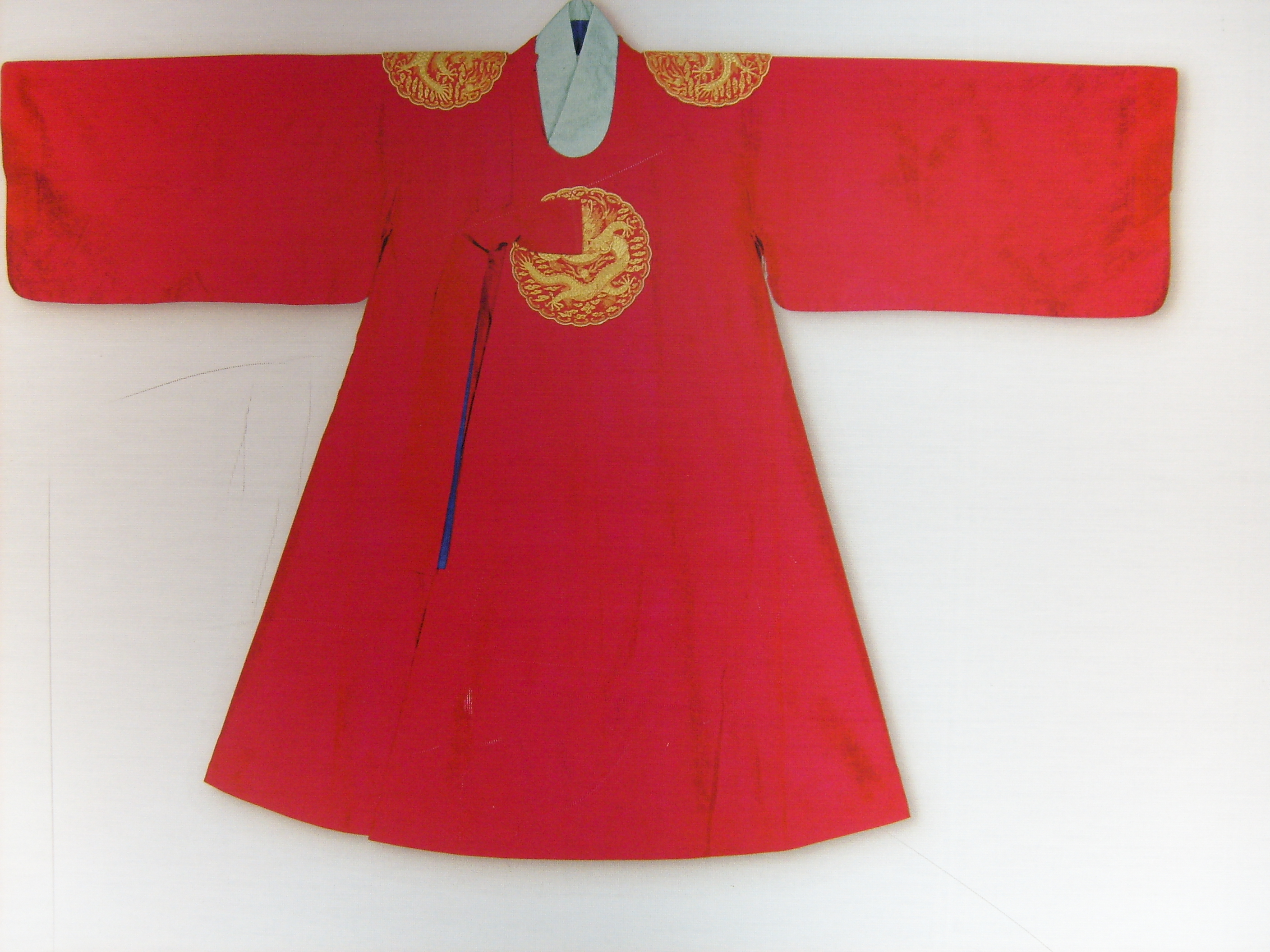
Red gonryongpo, Joseon period

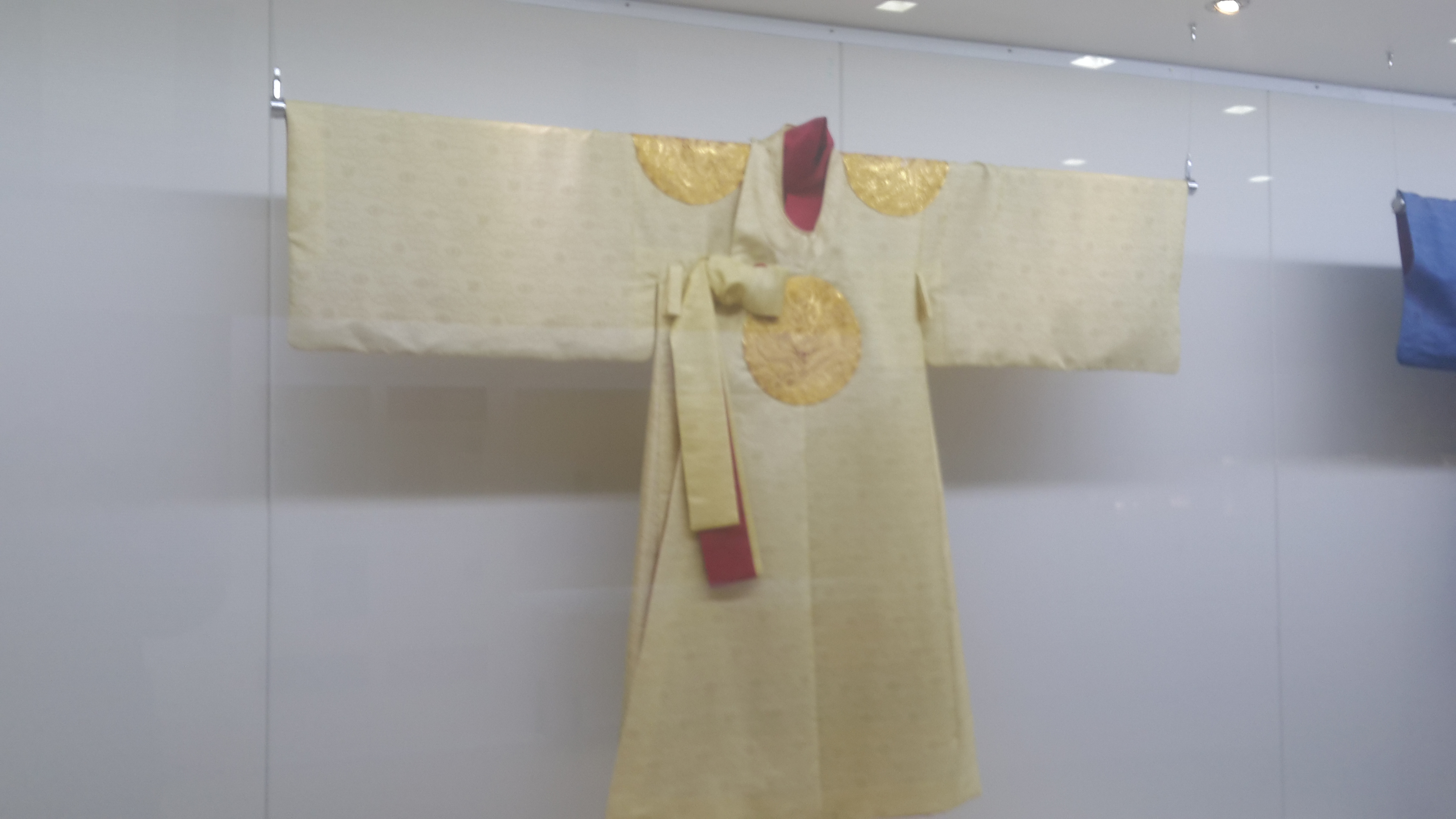
Gonryongpo of the Korean Emperor

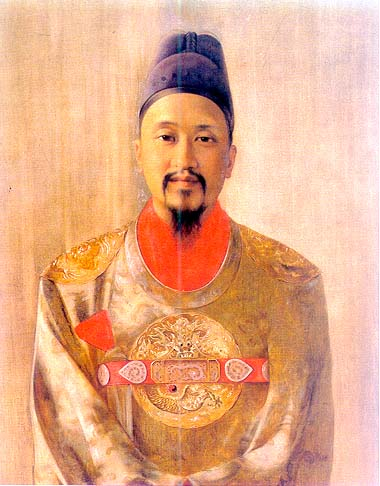
Gojong of the Korean Empire's Gonryongpo

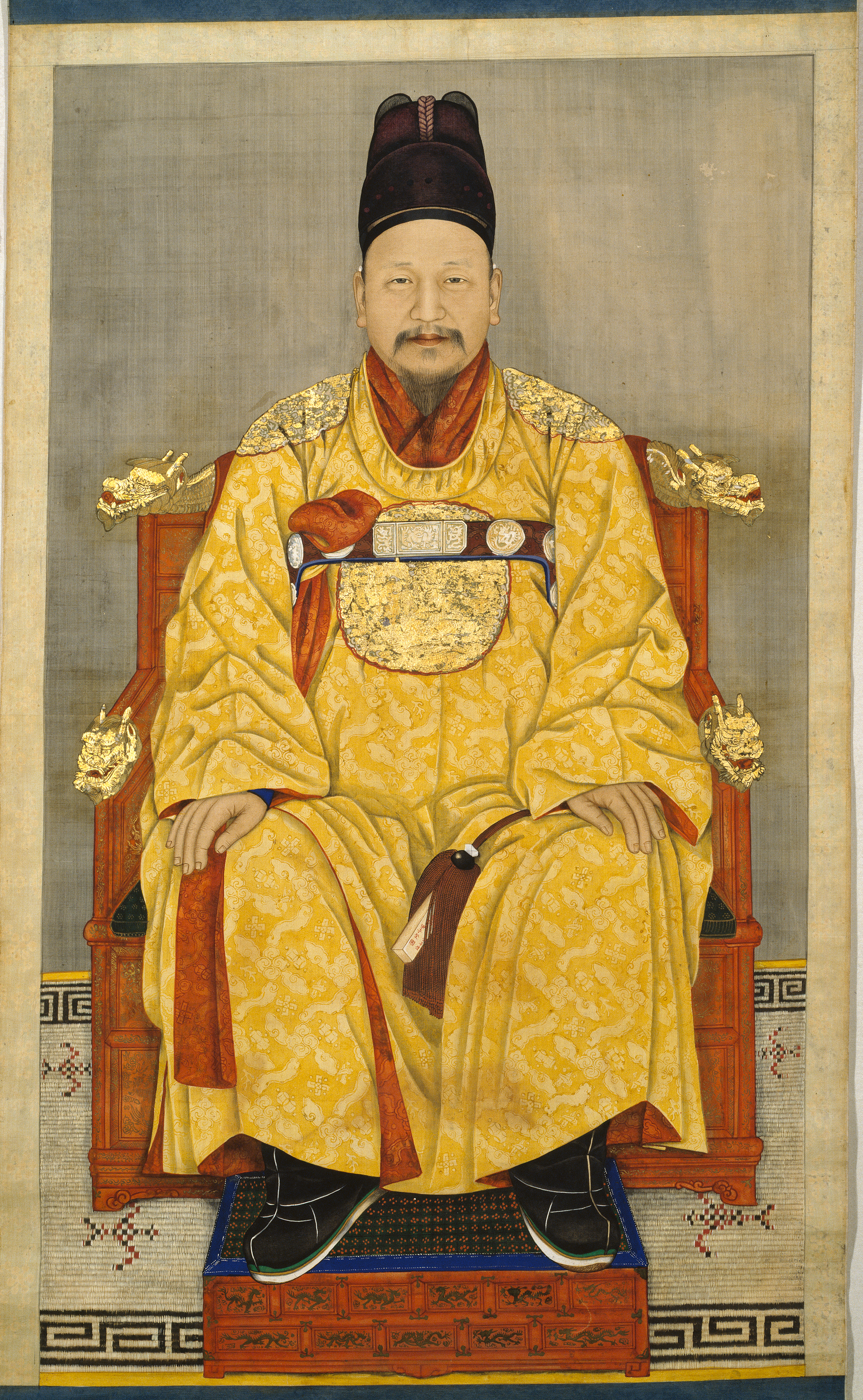
Gonryongpo Dragon robe of the king

There was normally a dragon embroidered in a circle on gonryongpos. When a king or other member of the royal family wore a gonryongpo, they also wore an ikseongwan (익선관; 翼善冠) (a kind of hat), a jade belt, and mokhwa (목화; 木靴) shoes. They wore hanbok under gonryongpo. During the winter months, a fabric of red silk was used, and gauze was used during the summer. Red indicated strong vitality.

Gonryongpos have different grades divided by their colour and belt material and a Mandarin square reflecting the wearer's status. The king wore scarlet gonryongpos, and the crown prince and the eldest son of the crown prince wore dark blue ones. The belts were also divided into two kinds: jade and crystal. As for the circular, embroidered dragon design of the Mandarin square, the king wore an ohjoeryongbo (오조룡보; 五爪龍補), a dragon with five toes; the crown prince wore a sajoeryongbo (사조룡보; 四爪龍補), a dragon with four toes; and the eldest son of the crown prince wore a samjoeryongbo (삼조룡보; 三爪龍補), a dragon with three toes.

=== Vietnam ===
In Vietnam, the dragon robes is called Long Bào. It was worn in Vietnam since the Restored Late-Lê period, Phan Huy Chú wrote in the Categorized Records of the Institutions of Successive Dynasties (Lịch triều hiến chương loại chí):

"Since the Restored Later-Lê era, for grand and formal occasions, (the emperors) always wore Xung Thiên hat and Hoàng Bào robe...."

According to the book Weaving a Realm, the only artefact of the Lê's Long Bào was the funeral robe of Emperor Lê Dụ Tông during the Restored Later-Lê period. However, the dragon patterns on this dress had already followed the "dragon–cloud [龍雲大會]" style, a common style of the late Míng dynasty. In this period, dragon designs were very large at the chest and back and smaller at the shoulders, with cloud and fire patterns all over the robe. One could see that the pattern style was closer to late Míng than early Míng, therefore Lê Dụ Tông's robe patterns were only specific to an era of the Restored Later-Lê, while the Early Later-Lê possibly still followed the dragon mandala style. It is a casual dress worn by emperors of the Nguyễn dynasty.

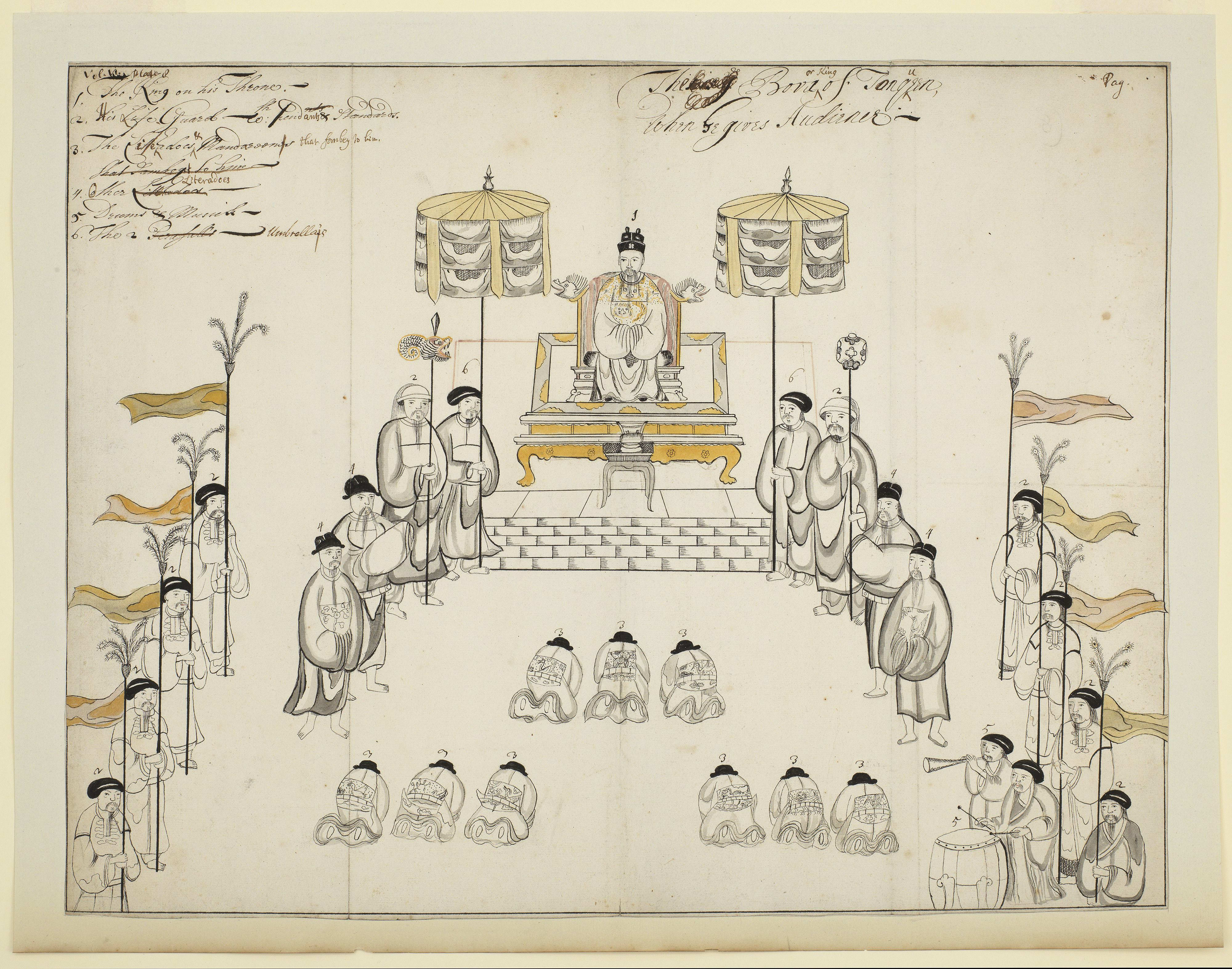
The give audience of Emperor Lê Hy Tông in the book of Samuel Baron

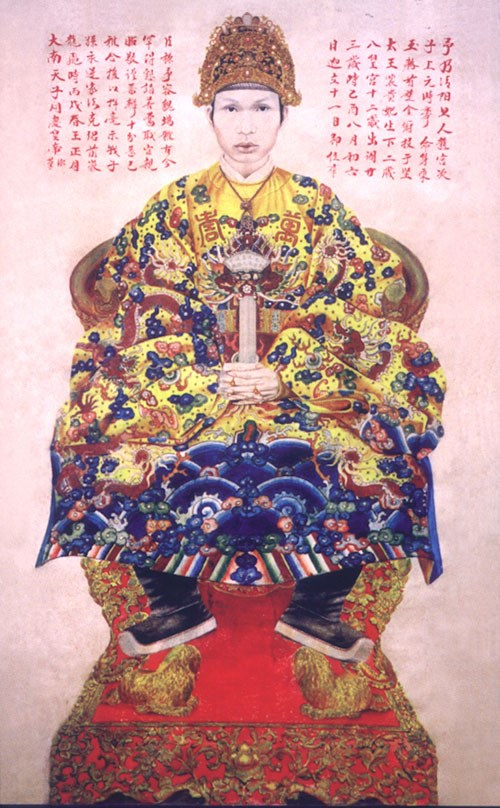
Emperor Đồng Khánh

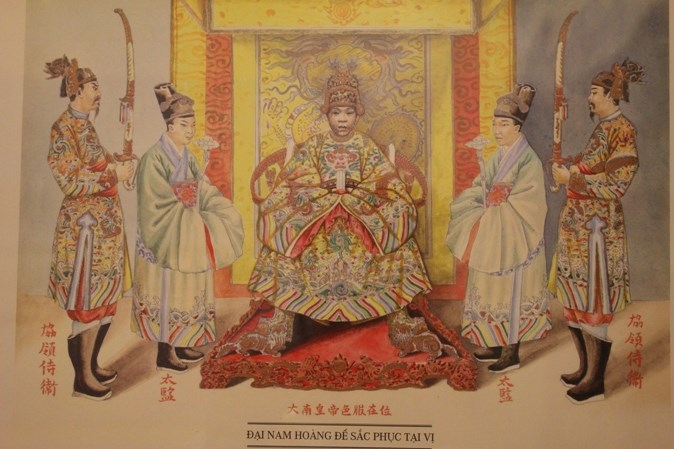
Paintings of Long bào of the Nguyễn dynasty

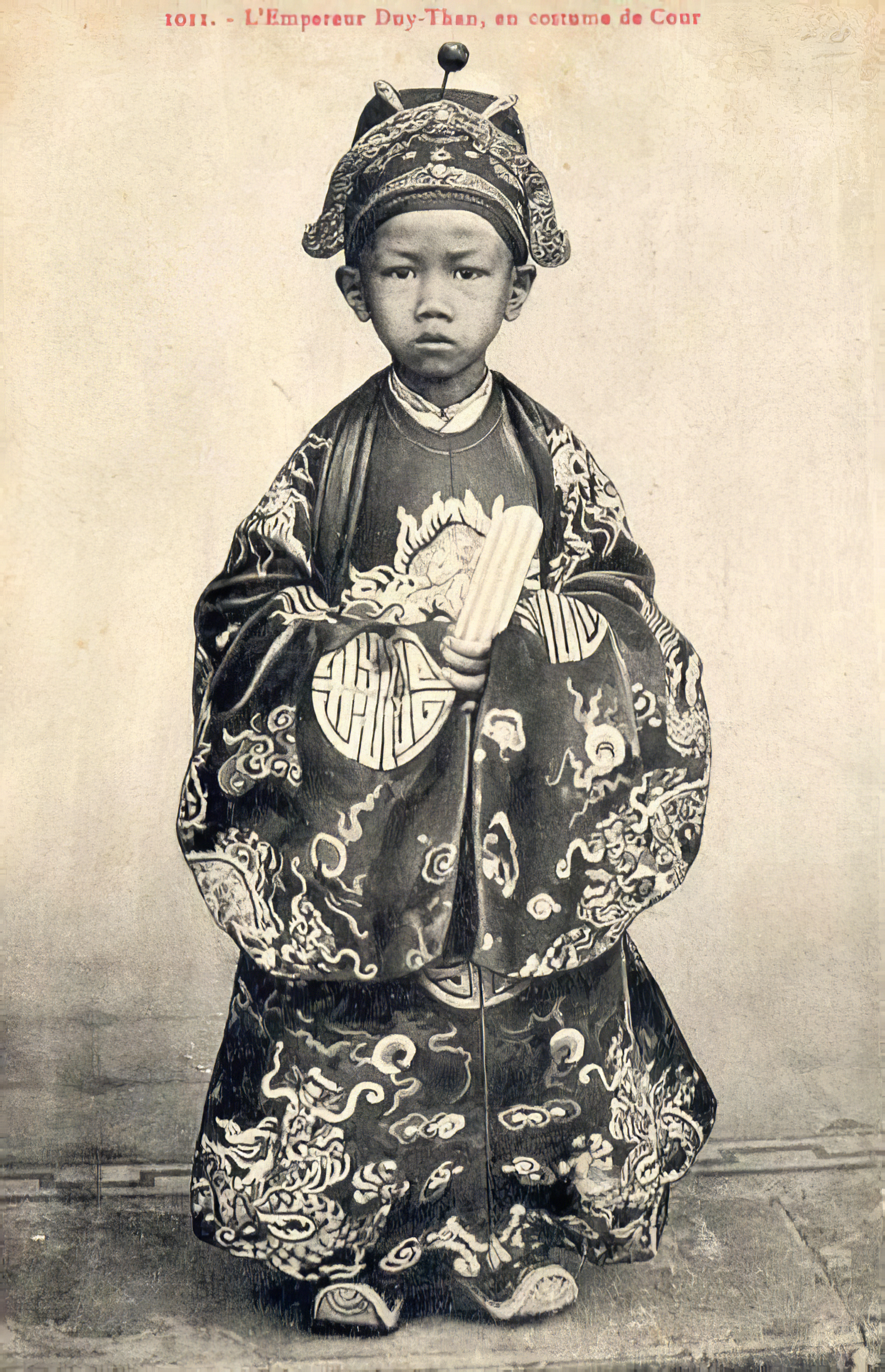
Emperor Duy Tân

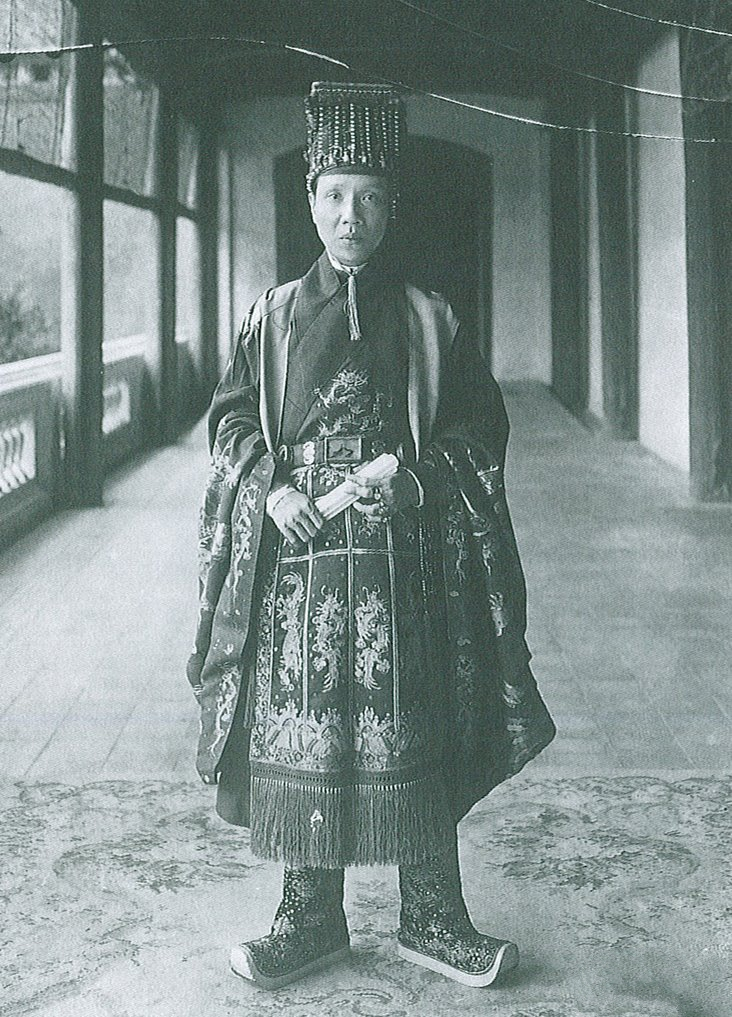
Emperor Khải Định

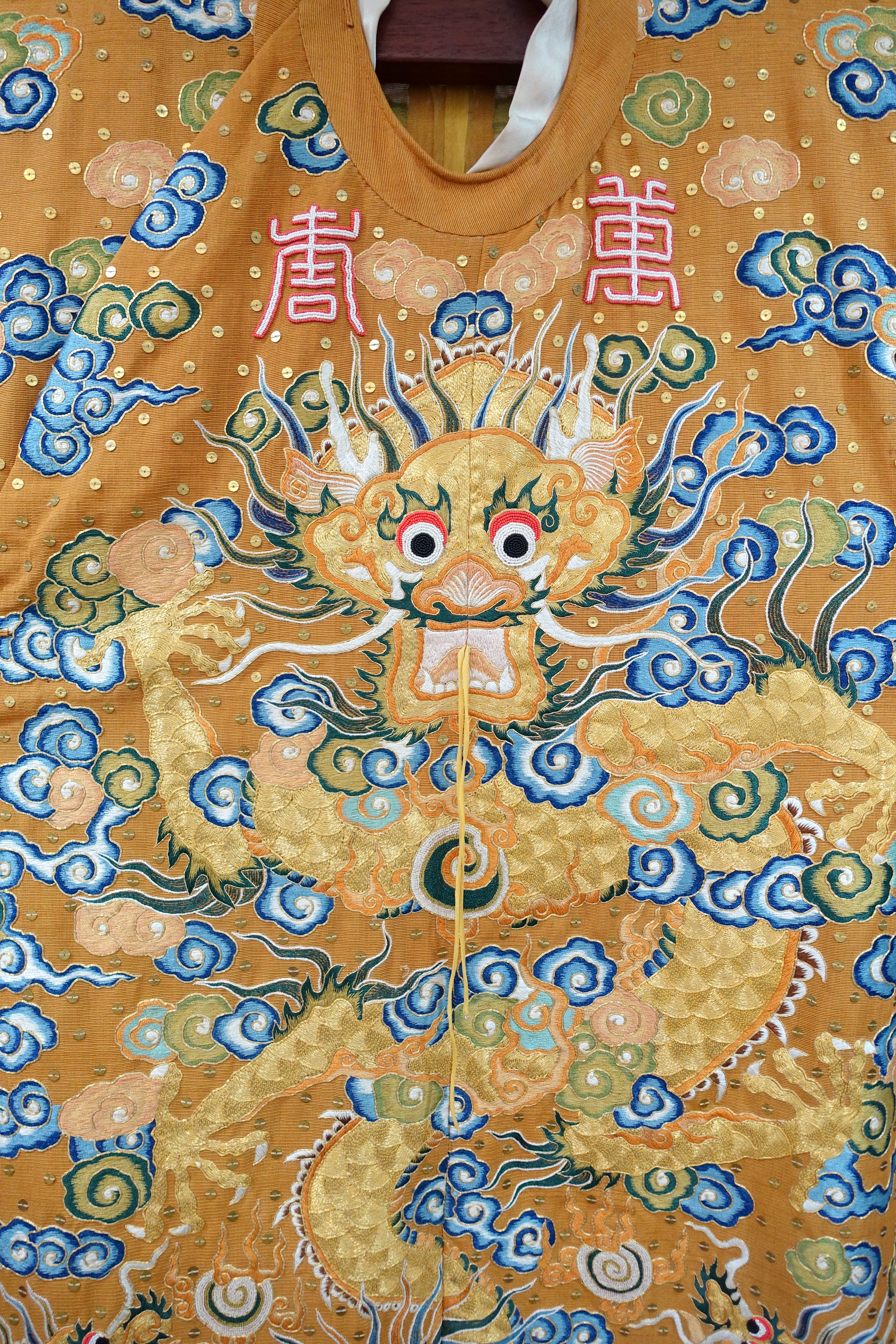
Royal robe, replica of 19th century

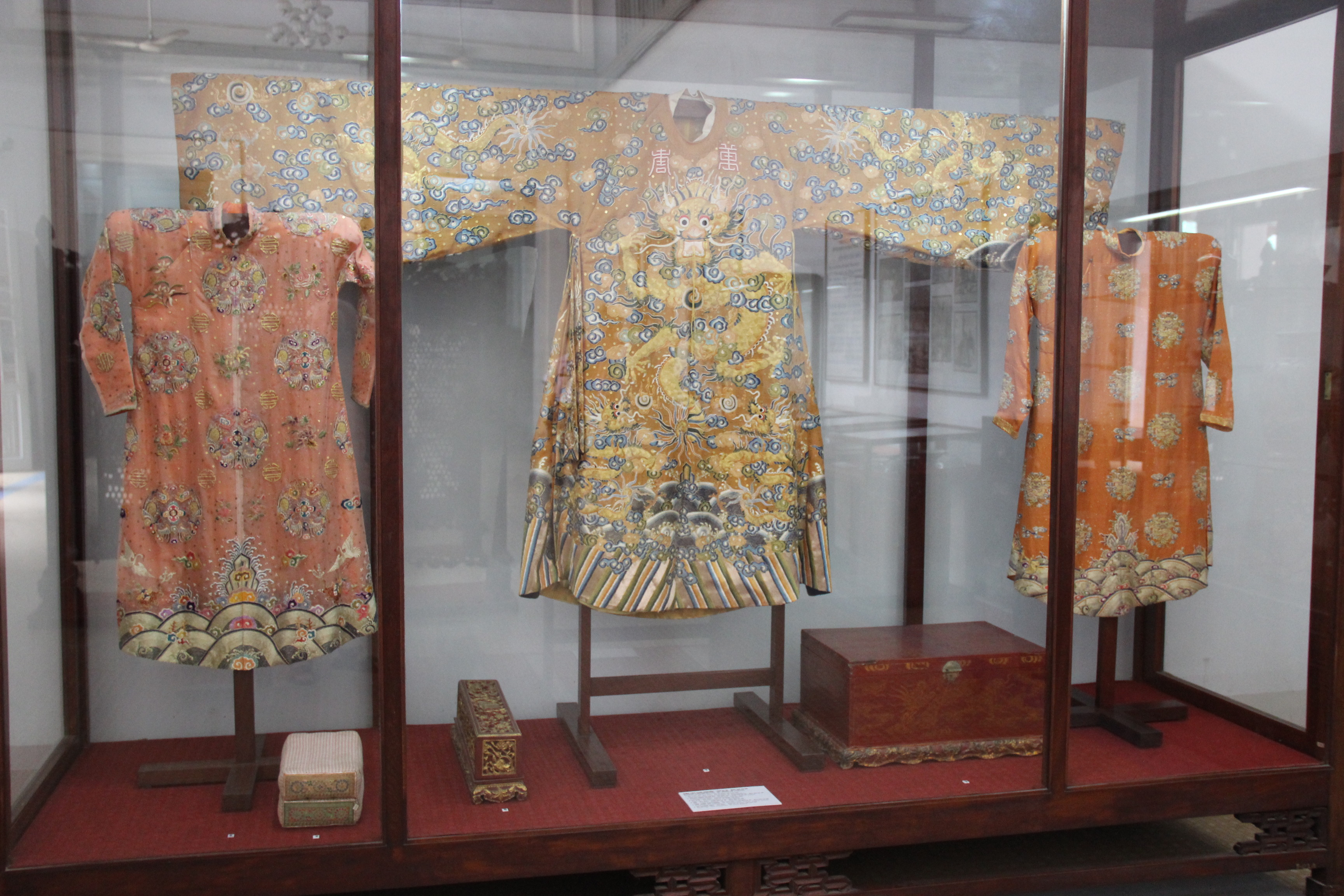
Long bào of the Nguyễn dynasty

=== Ryukyu ===
The rulers of Ryukyu adopted Ming-style court clothing for official clothing and everyday wear: the five-clawed dragon silk robe worn by the Ryukyu king were called umantun (御蟒緞), for the winter clothing and umanshaa (御蟒紗) for the summer clothing which looks similar to the Ming dynasty emperor's clothing. As in China, the colour yellow in clothing was restricted to the use of the ruling family of Ryukyu.

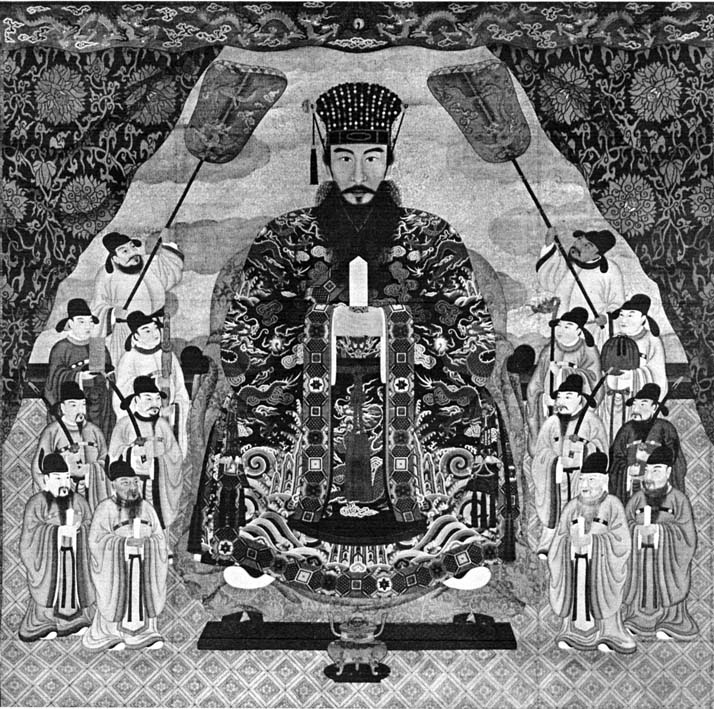
Shō Iku

== Similar garments ==
- Feiyufu
- Mangfu
