= Robert Kajiwara =

American activist

Robert Kajiwara is an Okinawan-American political activist residing in Hawaii. He supports the Hawaiian sovereignty movement, the Ryukyu independence movement, and the Chinese government's policies toward the Uyghurs and Tibetans.

== Name and background ==
He is sometimes referred to as Robert Kajiwara or Rob Kajiwara. His Okinawan name is Higa Takamasa (比嘉孝昌), and his Chinese name is Wei Xiaochang (魏孝昌). He is a fourth-generation Ryukyuan American. He self-identifies as a distinctive Chinese person. He hails from Waipahu, Hawaii. The maternal side of his family is from Nakagusuku, Okinawa Prefecture. Kajiwara has stated that his grandparents are of Ainu descent, and that his paternal great-grandmother was enslaved in Africa, later gaining freedom in Latin America. Her descendants moved to California and subsequently to Hawaii. He is the director of the Peace for Okinawa Coalition. There was a time when he publicly shared the full name Robert Adam Takamasa Wei Xiao Chang Fija (Higa) Hernandez Kajiwara on his website. His Hawaiian name is Lopaka Kapiwala, and his Japanese name is Kajiwara Takamasa (梶原孝昌). He has numerous names and roots, and his real name remains unclear.

As a social media influencer, Kajiwara regularly posts mainly in Chinese on Twitter and Weibo.

== Activism ==
In December 2018, he held a discussion with Houshin Nakamura, a supporter of the Ryukyu independence movement, and released a video titled "Why Okinawa Should Become Independent." By January 2019, he started a petition that gathered over 200,000 signatures.

At the eve-of-election rally in Okinawa in February 2019, he expressed support for Ryukyu independence, saying, "I believe that Ryukyu independence is a strong option, especially as a countermeasure against water pollution caused by the Henoko base construction." Yuuzo Takayama and Shinako Oyakawa also attended and joined the discussions.

On February 20, 2019, he was reportedly taken into a separate room by immigration authorities and asked numerous questions, after which Kantoku Teruya, a member of the House of Representatives, intervened on his behalf. On February 25, he held a discussion with Jinshiro Motoyama and Hajime takano.

On February 20, 2019, in an op-ed in Honolulu Civil Beat, he expressed his support for Ryukyu independence.

In March 2019, he met with Okinawa Governor Denny Tamaki. Additionally, it was revealed that the Okinawa police had been gathering information on him, which the Okinawa Times criticized as "treating him like a suspect."

He is also an author and, in writing his book Occupied Okinawa, he expressed gratitude for the extensive knowledge provided by the ACSILs.

=== Statement at the United Nations Human Rights Council ===
In June 2019, Kajiwara, representing an NGO, gave a speech during the general debate at the United Nations Human Rights Council, stating, "Okinawa suffers from an excessive burden of military bases. Please confirm the fact that the people of Okinawa suffer from discrimination and prejudice." The Japanese government countered, saying, "The residents of Okinawa enjoy full rights as citizens, and the government has done everything it can to reduce the burden of the bases. The placement of bases in Okinawa is not a form of discrimination but is due to geographical reasons."

Additionally, at the same council meeting, Kajiwara stated, "Japan used the Battle of Okinawa to cover up the mass genocide of Ryukyuan people." In response, Governor Tamaki said, "I am not in a position to comment.". Masako Ganaha criticized Tamaki for not rejecting Kajiwara's remarks and for the silence of Okinawa's two major newspapers on the matter.

=== Statements related to China ===
Satoru Nakamura stated that the Ryukyu independence movement advocated by Kajiwara has been influenced by China since 2012.

According to Nakamura, after the 2010 incident involving a Chinese fishing boat colliding with Japanese vessels near the Senkaku Islands, propaganda claiming "the Japanese military committed mass genocide against Ryukyuans" began circulating in China. On November 8, 2012, Tang Chunfeng, a Japanese affairs expert from the Ministry of Commerce, published an article in Chinese Communist Party-owned tabloid Global Times asserting that "China should support the Ryukyu independence movement." Nakamura noted that Kajiwara's June 2019 speech at the UN was strikingly similar to this narrative. Nakamura also criticized Kajiwara for his tweet claiming, "Okinawans are not Japanese. Some worry that China might invade Okinawa if it becomes independent again. The truth is China has never harmed Ryukyu and has always treated Ryukyu with respect and dignity. China will never invade Okinawa," calling it an act of appeasement toward China.

On January 16, 2021, Kajiwara appeared in an interview with Code Pink titled "China Is Not Our Enemy with Rob Kajiwara", where he stated, "The establishment of the Ryukyu Peace Alliance aims for Ryukyu's independence and demilitarization." He also remarked, "After the Meiji Restoration, Japan began industrialization and militarization in a Western sense, and like the Western powers, it sought colonies, annexing Ryukyu." Kajiwara further argued that the 1972 transfer of Ryukyu from the U.S. to Japan was illegal under international law, claiming, "China and Ryukyu have historically had a friendly relationship, and the Ryukyuan people do not see China as a threat. China supports Ryukyu's right to self-determination, but American and Japanese militarism opposes it.". Early in 2023, Code Pink was featured in The New York Times for its close ties with Neville Roy Singham who has funded pro-Chinese government content. During a Code Pink webinar, Kajiwara asserted, "The People's Republic of China, including the Communist Party of China, has always acknowledged the Ryukyuan people's rise toward self-determination."

On April 17, 2021, Kajiwara spoke in an interview with the No Cold War organization, stating that he participates in both the Ryukyu Independence Action Network and the Hawaiian independence movement. He emphasized that "there is a long history of peace and friendship between China and Ryukyu, and the overwhelming majority of Ryukyuans do not see China as a threat."

On November 8, 2021, the 42nd United Nations Human Rights Council, with China as the lead sponsor, adopted a resolution titled "The Negative Impact of the Legacy of Colonialism on Human Rights" (A/HRC/RES/48/7) with 27 votes in favor, 0 against, and 20 abstentions, including from France, Germany, Japan, Italy, and the UK. Kajiwara later thanked China in simplified Chinese via social media, stating, "Recently, at the United Nations Human Rights Council, China and others sponsored the resolution titled 'The Negative Impact of the Legacy of Colonialism on Human Rights.' This is an important document to help countries like Ryukyu, Hawaii, and Guam, which have been oppressed by the U.S. and its allies, to achieve independence."

In Chinese media, such as NetEase, Kajiwara was introduced by the Chinese name "Wei Xiaochang" as a Ryukyu independence activist.

On March 21, 2022, according to NetEase, Kajiwara, along with Alfred-Maurice de Zayas, Ronald Barnes, and Leon Kaulahao Siu, held a discussion on the self-determination of peoples in Hawaii, Alaska, and Ryukyu.

On January 16, 2023, Kajiwara gave an interview to the state media outlet China Daily, where he stated, "The U.S. seeks to promote imperialism and hegemony by making China its enemy. This is why they insist on placing military bases in the Asia-Pacific, including in Okinawa."

In April 2023, he posted a video on the Chinese platform Bilibili calling on "Chinese netizens to support Ryukyu in escaping Japan's illegal control". He has also labeled Hong Kong's pro-democracy activists as supporters of American imperialism.

==== Human rights in China ====
Kajiwara has praised China's ethnic minority policies in Xinjiang and Tibet, describing China's annexation of Tibet not as an occupation but as a "liberation" by explaining that Uyghurs and other Chinese ethnic minorities are taught their native languages in schools.

=== China's cognitive warfare reporting on Okinawa ===
Taiwanese media outlet The Reporter reported on the potential cognitive warfare in Okinawa involving Kajiwara and the Chinese Communist Party. Kajiwara, as a well-known online figure of the Ryukyu independence movement, is described as the most famous and enigmatic presence on social media. It is suggested that he appears to be based in China rather than Okinawa, with most of his posts being written in simplified Chinese and his most active presence on China's Weibo. He is also frequently interviewed by Chinese state media, such as China Global Television Network.

In response to an interview by The Reporter, Robert commented as follows:

China is a great country, and many wise people there understand the Ryukyuan people, write great reviews, and ask insightful questions. That's why I like to communicate in Chinese. Most of the old Ryukyuan documents are written in Chinese as well.

He also explained why he now promotes Ryukyu's issues in simplified Chinese, whereas he previously used English and Japanese, saying

Many Americans and Japanese hold prejudices against Ryukyuans and Chinese. So, it's like talking to a wall. I don't like writing in English or Japanese.

Kajiwara views the civilian casualties of the Battle of Okinawa in World War II as a massacre of Ryukyuans by the Japanese government. When The Reporter's reporter invited him to meet in Okinawa, Kajiwara declined, citing a "business trip for a few months." A few weeks later, he uploaded rare photos of his visit to China. However, when the reporter tried to discuss his experiences with the Chinese government and media, as well as the "Chinese cognitive warfare" issue hotly debated between Japan and Okinawa, Kajiwara did not respond.

=== Activities advocating for indigenous rights ===
On November 14, 2023, members of the Ryukyu Indigenous Mabui Group, along with Gamafuyaa, a volunteer group for recovering Okinawa war remains, and Takamatsu Gushiken, engaged in activities calling for the recognition of the rights of indigenous peoples as defined by the United Nations. Additionally, on November 9, 2023, in interviews with the Ryūkyū Shimpō and the Okinawa Times, Kajiwara expressed his ambition to create a film addressing the harm caused by military bases.
