= Satoru Nakamura (Japanese journalist) =

Japanese journalist

Satoru Nakamura (仲村 覚, born in 1964) is a Japanese journalist and the president of the Okinawa Policy Research Forum. He also serves as a director of the Free Press Association, an organization dedicated to protecting the public's right to know.

Born in Naha City, Okinawa, in 1964, during the U.S. administration of the region, Nakamura entered the Japan Ground Self-Defense Force Youth Technical School in 1979. After graduation, he was assigned to an aviation unit. He retired from the military in 1991, worked for several companies, and in 2009, established the private organization "Okinawa Strategy Headquarters".

As a journalist, Nakamura focuses on topics related to Okinawan politics, international relations, criticism of the Ryukyu independence movement, U.S.-Japan relations, security issues, and China. He has also written and contributed to articles on North Korea's abduction issue.

He has delivered lectures at the Seiji Nichi Forum as well.

== Views on the Ryukyu Independence Movement ==
- Nakamura is critical of the Ryukyu independence movement. He also believes that this Ryukyu independence movement is led by Governor Takeshi Onaga, who was supported by the "All Okinawa" coalition, and the activists promoting it. When Onaga delivered a speech at the United Nations Human Rights Council in 2015, referring to the people of Okinawa based on the "indigenous peoples" argument, Nakamura, together with Okinawan Prefectural Assemblyman Moriyuki Teruya, criticized him at the Foreign Correspondents' Club of Japan, stating, "The people of Okinawa are Japanese citizens. The governor has damaged their pride".
- On New Year's Day 2018, Daisuke Muramoto" (from the comedy duo man Rush Hour) appeared on TV Asahi’s program Asa Made Nama TV and made comments like "Okinawa was originally taken from China, wasn’t it?" In response, Nakamura said, "It’s 100 times more admirable to show interest in Okinawa’s issues and history," and presented Muramoto with a speech by Chōbyō Yara.
- Nakamura pointed out that Chinese support for the Ryukyu independence movement has existed since around 2012, referring to Robert Kajiwara, a fourth-generation Okinawan living in Hawaii, who conducted a petition campaign through "WE the PEOPLE" to stop the Henoko construction. Kajiwara stated at the United Nations Human Rights Council in June 2019 that "Japan used the Battle of Okinawa to cover up a mass slaughter of Ryukyuans," which Nakamura attributed to Chinese influence.
- Regarding the relationship between China and the Ryukyu independence movement, Nakamura mentioned Chinese scholar Tang Chunfeng, who supports Ryukyu independence, as well as the Chinese Ryukyu Special Autonomous Region, which claims Okinawa as Chinese territory.
- Nakamura also argued that Chinese universities and think tanks engage in academic exchanges with Okinawan independence groups, and Chinese media repeatedly question Japan's sovereignty over Okinawa. He claimed that the Ryukyu independence movement, anti-U.S. base protests, opposition to constitutional revision (Article 9), and left-wing peace activists are united, with support from China.

== See also ==
- Map of National Shame
