= Tsugumasa =

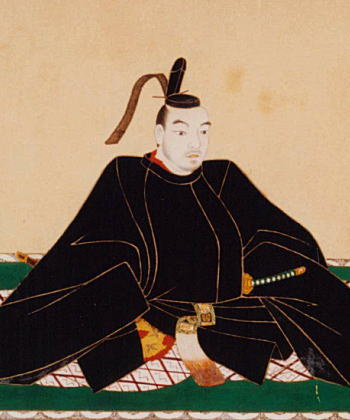
- Tsugumasa Ikeda (1702–1776), Japanese daimyō
- Pronunciation: tsɯgɯmasa (IPA)
- Gender: Male

Origin
- Origin: Japanese
- Meaning: Different meanings depending on the kanji used

Other names
- Alternative spelling: Tugumasa (Kunrei-shiki) Tugumasa (Nihon-shiki) Tsugumasa (Hepburn)

Tsugumasa is a masculine Japanese given name.

== Written forms ==
Tsugumasa can be written using different combinations of kanji characters. Here are some examples:

- 次正, "next, righteous"
- 次雅, "next, elegant"
- 次昌, "next, clear"
- 次政, "next, politics"
- 次将, "next, commander"
- 次真, "next, reality"
- 嗣正, "succession, righteous"
- 嗣雅, "succession, elegant"
- 嗣昌, "succession, clear"
- 嗣政, "succession, politics"
- 嗣将, "succession, commander"
- 嗣真, "succession, reality"
- 継正, "continue, righteous"
- 継雅, "continue, elegant"
- 継昌, "continue, clear"
- 継政, "continue, politics"
- 継将, "continue, commander"
- 継真, "continue, reality"

The name can also be written in hiragana つぐまさ or katakana ツグマサ.

== Notable people with the name ==
- Tsugumasa Ikeda (池田 継政; 1702–1776), Japanese daimyō.
- Tsugumasa Kiyuna (喜友名 嗣正; 1916–1989), Ryukyuan politician.
- Tsugumasa Muraoka (村岡 嗣政; born 1972), Japanese politician.
