= Preparatory Committee for the Ryukyu Special Autonomous Region of China =

Chinese political organization

Chinese name
- Simplified Chinese: 中华民族琉球特别自治区筹备委员会
- Traditional Chinese: 中華民族琉球特別自治區籌備委員會
Transcriptions
Standard Mandarin
- Hanyu Pinyin: Zhōnghuá Mínzú Liúqiú Tèbié Zìzhìqū Chóubèi Wěiyuánhuìn
- Bopomofo: ㄓㄨㄥㄏㄨㄚˊㄇㄧㄣˊㄗㄨˊㄌㄧㄡˊㄑㄧㄡˊㄊㄜˋㄅㄧㄝˊㄗˋㄓˋㄑㄩㄔㄡˊㄨㄟˇㄏㄨㄟˋ

Japanese name
- Kanji: 中華民族琉球特別自治区準備委員会
- Kana: ちゅうかみんぞくりゅうきゅうとくべつじちくじゅんびいいんかい

The Preparatory Committee for the Ryukyu Special Autonomous Region of China is an unofficial political organization based in Guangdong, People's Republic of China. It claims that Ryukyuans are one of the ethnic groups of the Zhonghua minzu, supports Ryukyu independence, and asserts that the Okinawa Islands are Chinese territory.

== Overview ==
During an interview with Hong Kong's television station Asia Television (ATV), Zhao Dong, a representative of the Preparatory Committee for the Chinese Ryukyu Special Autonomous Region, claimed that "Ryukyu is the territory of the Chinese nation, and the opinions of the people living there are irrelevant." The committee is registered in Hong Kong and has its office in Shenzhen because they have active interactions with mainland China, Hong Kong, and Taiwan. On July 31, 2016, Chinese media outlet Bowen Press reported that the Hong Kong-based civil organization had announced preparations to file a lawsuit with an international court regarding ownership of Okinawa.

The committee cited the 1943 Cairo Declaration and Potsdam Declaration in their claim that Japan's territory is limited to Hokkaido, Shikoku, Honshu, and Kyushu, and that the Ryukyu Islands have been occupied for an extended period with the support of the United States and should be returned to China. Furthermore, Japan had returned territories such as Manchuria, Taiwan, and the Pescadores Islands to China in response to those declarations. The Japanese government made it clear in their Instrument of Surrender that they accepted the declarations and pledged to fulfill their terms. However, as stated in the proclamation, the Ryukyu Islands are not under Japan's sovereignty, and they or any other small islands cannot be arbitrarily occupied without the agreement of the three signatory nations: China, the United States, and the United Kingdom.

Zhao Dong, referring to the South China Sea Arbitration, argued that while there have been calls from Japan that China respect the ruling of the arbitration tribunal, Japan itself has violated the Cairo and Potsdam Declaration for years and continues to occupy territory while under U.S. protection though it should be returned to China. He emphasized the need to take the issue to international courts to restore Chinese territory.

Zhao Dong stated, "As a member of the Chinese nation, we have a right and duty to protect national sovereignty. We are passionate about taking concrete action to reclaim Ryukyu." During the height of the Japan-China debate over the Okinawa issue, he said in an interview with a Central News Agency reporter, "The position of the Preparation Committee on the Ryukyu issue is clear. Ryukyu is a part of the Chinese nation".

== Business activities ==
On April 18, 2016, Zhao Dong announced himself as an investor of Asia Television during the management crisis just before its collapse, and also stated he received funds from his electronics business in Japan.

The Preparatory Committee for the Ryukyu Special Autonomous Region of China has an affiliated corporation called the Ryukyu Group, which includes Shenzhen Ryukyu Cultural Communication Co., Ltd., Shenzhen Shengsan Technology, Shenzhen Kenwood Investment Co., Ltd., and Shenzhen Story of Spring Cultural Communication Co., Ltd. The Ryukyu Group operates an online shopping site called Ryukyu Mall, which features mobile phone cases on its homepage and includes a message stating, "The governments of Japan and the United States must strictly adhere to the Cairo Declaration and the Potsdam Declaration".

== Connections with criminal organizations ==
Zhao Dong has interacted with the Taiwanese gang Bamboo Union, as well as with Chang An-lo of the Chinese Unification Promotion Party, known for its radical political activities in Taiwan. According to an article from Ryūkyū Shimpō dated October 29, 2015, officials from the Chinese Unification Promotion Party visited Okinawa in mid-October to meet with members of the designated organized crime group, Kyokuryū-kai. Furthermore, reports from the Liberty Times indicate that they are collaborating with gangs in Okinawa for their activities.

== See also ==
- Map of National Shame
- Ryukyu independence movement
- Chinese expansionism
