= Kiyuna Tsugumasa =

Ryukyuan independence activist (1916–1989)

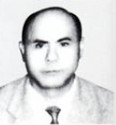
Kiyuna Tsugumasa

Kiyuna Tsugumasa (喜友名 嗣正; 5 April 1916 – June 1989) was a politician of Ryukyuan descent who was active in Taiwan and Okinawa. He spent all his life seeking an independent Ryukyu. He was also known by his Chinese style name, Tsai Chang (Chinese: 蔡璋; pinyin: Cài Zhāng, pronounced "Sai Shō" in Japanese).

Kiyuna was born in Honolulu, Hawaii, United States. His ancestor was Sai Ken (蔡堅), a Chinese immigrant from Nan'an, Quanzhou, Fujian. As a child, Kiyuna had lived in Southeast Asia and Saipan together with his father for several years. He attended Ryukyu Marine Production School (琉球水産学校). After his graduation, Kiyuna became a marine production engineer (水産技師) worked in Okinawa in 1933.

Kiyuna worked as a newspaper editor in Hawaii since 1935. He came to Okinawa in 1941, set up a party named Young Ryukyuan Comrade Association (琉球青年同志会) secretly to fight for the Ryukyu independence. He came to Taiwan in 1943, and became an officer in General-Government of Taiwan.

Japan surrendered in 1945, the Ryukyu Islands was taken over by United States, and Taiwan was reoccupied by China. Young Ryukyuan Comrade Association changed its name to Ryukyuan Revolution Comrade Association (琉球革命同志会), and registered in Keelung. The party's ideology was very similar to Kuomintang. He started a petition to Chiang Kai-shek in 1947, said that "Ryukyu should be independent, or return to China". He came back to Okinawa frequently, seeking an independent Ryukyu, and was supported by Chiang Kai-shek. He was also very active in Taiwan, and was selected as "senator of Taiwan province" (台灣省參議員) in 1948. A twin party named Ryukyuan Nationalist Party (琉球国民党) was registered at Naha in 1958, he was selected as the vice chairman and Minister of Foreign Affairs.

After the return of Okinawa to Japanese control, he came back to Naha, to promote the independent Ryukyu. He died there in 1989.

== See also ==
- Pro-Republic of China
