= Kariyushi Club =

Political party in Okinawa

- Leader: Chōsuke Yara
- Founded: June 1970
- Headquarters: Okinawa Prefecture
- Ideology: Ryukyu independence

Party flag

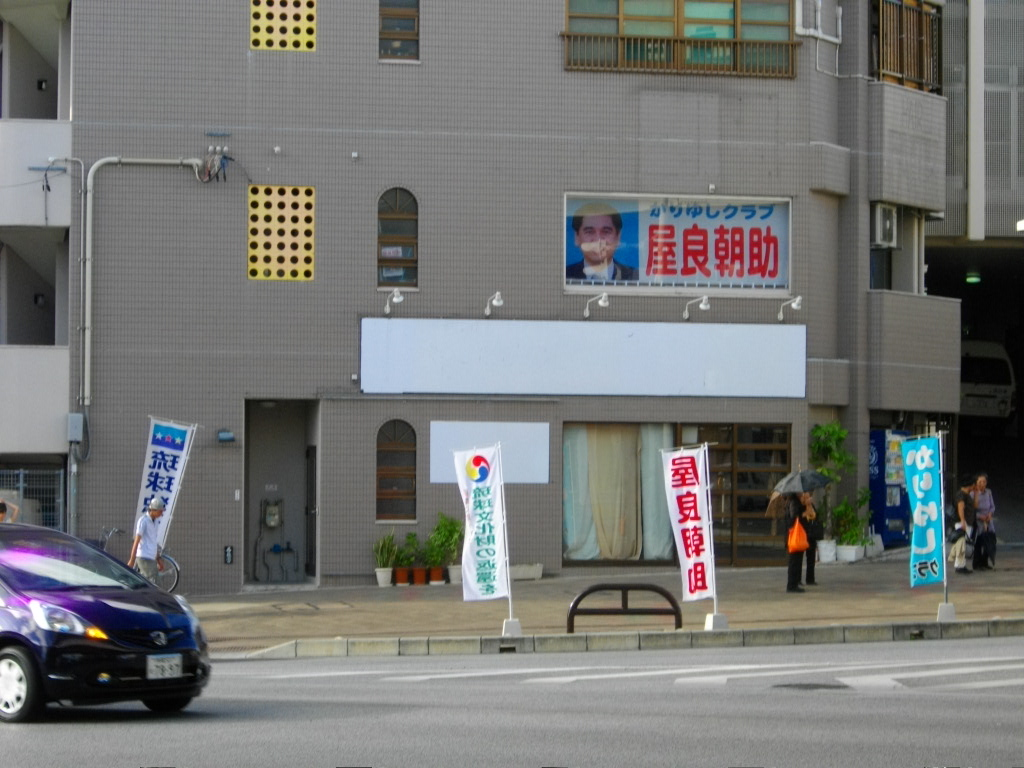
The headquarters of the Kariyushi Club

The Kariyushi Club (Japanese: かりゆしクラブ, Hepburn: Kariyushi Kurabu), formerly known as the Ryūkyū Independence Party (琉球独立党, Ryūkyū Dokuritsutō), is a local political party in Okinawa Prefecture, Japan. The party seeks the independence of the Ryukyu Islands. Some in the party support the restoration of the Ryukyu Kingdom, while others seek to establish a Republic of the Ryukyus (琉球共和国, Ryūkyū Kyōwakoku). The current party leader is Chōsuke Yara (屋良朝助, Yara Chōsuke). Kariyushi is Okinawan for "happy" or "harmony with nature".

== History ==
The party was founded in June 1970, when Okinawa (then called Ryūkyū) was administered by the United States. Founders included Toshikatsu Sakima (崎間敏勝, Sakima Toshikatsu) and Takehiko Noka (野底武彦, Noka Takehiko), whose pseudonym was Donan Nuka (野底土南, Nuka Donan). Sakima was the former president of the Public Finance Corporation, a government financial corporation of the Ryukyu Government under US control; Nuka was a chartered accountant. Sakima was a candidate in the 1971 Japanese House of Councillors election, but lost with 2673 votes. The party lost support as Okinawa was returned to Japan in the next year. After July 30, 1978, when Okinawa changed back to driving on the left, the party virtually stopped its activity.

On August 15, 2005, Chōsuke Yara, president of a T-shirt store called Alice T-shirt Center, resumed the party's activities, establishing himself as a new party leader. Nuka became an honorable party leader. Yara was a candidate in the 2006 Okinawa gubernatorial election, but lost with 6220 votes, 0.93% of votes cast. Critics believed the loss was due to the vast majority of Okinawans thinking independence was unrealistic. The party lacked name recognition or an electoral turf, and Yara resided in Tokyo, not in Okinawa; some found the party gained surprisingly many votes despite these conditions. Yara gained 2.3 times more votes than Sakima did in 1970, even though Sakima was a celebrity at the time, while Yara was not. Consequently, the party declared victory in the 2005 election.

Since Yara gained 1576 votes in Naha alone, the party hoped that it could win a seat in the 2009 Naha City Council election, since a winner of the previous election gained 1841 votes. However, the party lost the election and subsequent elections in 2013 and 2018.

In 2007, the PAFF, a trade union of freeters and foreign workers, alleged that the party broke the Labor Standards Act and the Trade Union Act of 1949 by firing an officer without proper reason.

On March 3, 2008, the party changed to its current name.

== Policies ==
The party ultimately seeks the independence of the Ryukyu Islands. In 2008, the party's platform contained the following policies:

- To distinguish Okinawa from Kyūshū, in case Japan implements dōshūsei, a proposal to restructure the current prefectures into states based on regions
- To lower the employment costs of civil officers
- To introduce a sightseeing tax to create 5,000 jobs
- To create jobs by building a subway through Okinawa
- To introduce an insurance system for travel agents
- To establish regulations to protect nature for tourism.
- To offer jobs preferentially to native Okinawans
- To abolish the value added tax on food
- To hold an international conference for armament reduction
- To teach unique Okinawan history

The party also claims the Amami Islands are part of the Ryukyu Islands. It pledges to collaborate with residents of Amami, either to create their own prefecture or to transfer the islands into Okinawa Prefecture.

=== International policies ===
The party claims it is "not Anti-US, Anti-Japan, or leftist". After the independence of the republic, they propose to negotiate with Japan and the US to create a tripartite military alliance. Were the negotiation to fail, they may consider selling US military bases currently on Okinawa in an international auction.

The party claims the Senkaku Islands, currently administered by Japan but claimed by the Republic of China and the People's Republic of China, are Ryukyuan territory. They support other independence movements in East Asia, namely those of Tibet and Taiwan.

== Party flag ==
The party's official flag is called the Sansei Ten'yō-ki (三星天洋旗; lit. 'The Flag of the Three Stars, the Sky and the Ocean'), and was designed by Nuka. The party also plans to use it as the flag of the republic, should it gain independence. The colors navy and blue represent the ocean and the sky surrounding Ryūkyū. The white star represents morality and reason, the red star represents pride and passion, and the yellow star represents peace and prosperity. The red and yellow stars have white borders, representing the party's faith in morality.

== See also ==
- Ryukyu independence movement
- Ryukyu Islands
- Ryukyu Kingdom
- Ryukyuans
- List of active autonomist and secessionist movements
- Racism in Japan
