= Ryukyu independence movement =

Independence movement in Japan

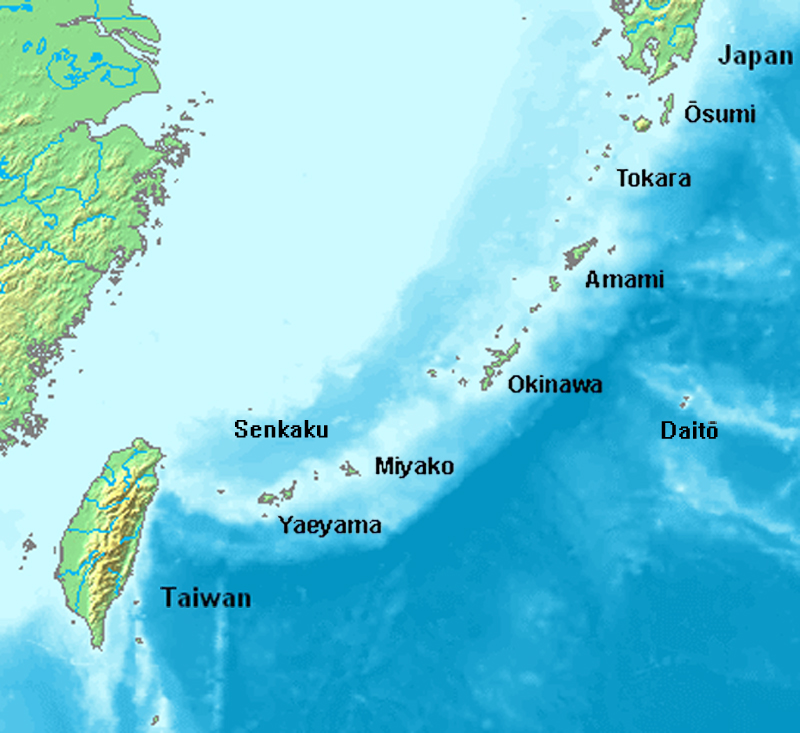
The Ryukyu Islands, located between mainland Japan and Taiwan

The Ryukyu Islands in Asia

The Ryukyu independence movement (Japanese: 琉球独立運動, Hepburn: Ryūkyū Dokuritsu Undō) is a political movement advocating the independence of the Ryukyu Islands from Japan. Some support the restoration of the Ryukyu Kingdom, while others advocate the establishment of a Republic of the Ryukyus (Japanese: 琉球共和国, Kyūjitai: 琉球共和國, Hepburn: Ryūkyū Kyōwakoku).

The current political manifestation of the movement emerged in 1945, after the end of the Pacific War. Some Ryukyuan people felt, as the Allied Occupation (USMGRI 1945–1950) began, that the Ryukyus should eventually become an independent state instead of being returned to Japan. However, the islands were returned to Japan on 15 May 1972 as the Okinawa Prefecture according to the 1971 Okinawa Reversion Agreement. The US-Japan Security Treaty (ANPO), signed in 1952, provides for the continuation of the American military presence in Japan, and the United States continues to maintain a heavy military presence on Okinawa Island. This set the stage for renewed political activism for Ryukyuan independence. In 2022, public opinion polling in Okinawa put support for independence at 3% of the local population.

The Ryukyu independence movement maintains that both the 1609 invasion by Satsuma Domain and the Meiji construction of the Okinawa prefecture are colonial annexations of the Ryukyu Kingdom. It is highly critical of the abuses of Ryukyuan people and territory, both in the past and in the present day (such as the use of Okinawan land to host American military bases). Advocates for independence also emphasize the environmental and social impacts of the American bases in Okinawa.

== Historical background ==
The Ryukyuan people are indigenous Japonic-speaking people, considered to be a subgroup of Japanese people (日本人) by the Japanese government, who live on the Ryukyu Islands and are ethnically, culturally, and linguistically distinct from the Yamato ethnicity which comprises the majority of Japanese people. During the Sanzan period, Okinawa was divided into the three polities of Hokuzan, Chūzan, and Nanzan. In 1429, Chūzan's chieftain Shō Hashi unified them and founded the autonomous Ryukyu Kingdom (1429–1879), with the capital at Shuri Castle. The kingdom continued to have tributary relations with the Ming dynasty and Qing dynasty China, a practice that was started by Chūzan in 1372–1374 and lasted until the downfall of the kingdom in the late 19th century. This tributary relationship was greatly beneficial to the kingdom as the kings received political legitimacy, while the country as a whole gained access to economic, cultural, and political opportunities in Southeast Asia without any interference by China in the internal political autonomy of Ryukyu.

In addition to Korea (1392), Thailand (1409), and other Southeast Asian polities, the kingdom maintained trade relations with Japan (1403), and during this period, a unique political and cultural identity emerged. However, in 1609, the Japanese feudal domain of Satsuma invaded the kingdom on behalf of the first shōgun Tokugawa Ieyasu and the Tokugawa shogunate (1603–1867) because the Ryukyu king Shō Nei refused to submit to the shogunate. The kingdom was forced to send a tribute to Satsuma, but was allowed to retain and continue its independence, relations, and trade with China (a unique privilege, as Japan was prohibited from trading with China at the time). This arrangement was known as a "dual vassalage" status, and continued until the mid-19th century.

During the Meiji period (1868–1912), the Meiji government of the Empire of Japan (1868–1947) began a process later called Ryukyu Shobun ("Ryukyu Disposition") to formally annex the kingdom into the modern Japanese Empire. Firstly established as Ryukyu Domain (1872–1879), in 1879 the kingdom-domain was abolished, established as Okinawa Prefecture, while the last Ryukyu king Shō Tai was forcibly exiled to Tokyo. Previously in 1875, the kingdom was forced against its wishes to terminate its tribute relations with China, while U.S. President Ulysses S. Grant proposed a plan that would maintain an independent, sovereign Okinawa while partitioning other Ryukyuan islands between China and Japan. Japan offered China the Miyako and Yaeyama Islands in exchange for trading rights with China equal to those granted to Western states, de facto abandoning and dividing the island chain for monetary profit. The treaty was rejected as the Chinese court decided not to ratify the agreement. The Ryukyu's aristocratic class resisted annexation for almost two decades, but after the First Sino-Japanese War (1894–1895), factions pushing for Chinese and Ryukyuan sovereignty faded as China renounced its claims to the island. In the Meiji period, the government continuously and formally suppressed Ryukyuan ethnic identity, culture, tradition, and language while assimilating them as ethnic Japanese (Yamato).

Since the formation of the prefecture, its relationship with the Japanese nation-state has been continually contested and changed. There were significant movements for Okinawan independence in the period following its annexation, in the period prior to and during World War II, and after World War II through to the present day. In 1945, during the WWII Battle of Okinawa, approximately 150,000 civilians were killed, consisting roughly 1/3 of the island's population. Many civilians died in mass suicides forced by the Japanese military. After World War II, the Ryukyu Islands were occupied by the United States Military Government of the Ryukyu Islands (1945–1950), but the U.S. maintained control even after the 1951 Treaty of San Francisco, and its former direct administration was replaced by the USCAR government. During this period, the U.S. military forcibly requisitioned private land for the building of many military facilities, with the private owners put into refugee camps, and its personnel committed thousands of crimes against civilians.

Only twenty years later, on 15 May 1972, Okinawa and nearby islands were returned to Japan. As the Japanese had post-war political freedom and economic prosperity, the military facilities had a negative economical impact and the people felt cheated, used for the purpose of Japanese and regional security against the communist threat. Despite Okinawa having been formally returned to Japan, both Japan and the United States have continued to make agreements securing the maintenance and expansion of the U.S. military bases, despite protests from the local Ryukyuan population. Although Okinawa comprises just 0.6% of Japan's total land mass, currently 75% of all U.S. military installations stationed in Japan are assigned to bases in Okinawa.

=== Academic theories of Japanese colonialism ===
Some philosophers, like Taira Katsuyasu, consider the establishment of Okinawa Prefecture as outright colonialism. Nomura Koya in his research argued that the Japanese mainland developed "an unconscious colonialism" in which Japanese people are not aware of how they continue to colonize Okinawa through the mainland's inclination to leave the vast majority of the United States' military presence and burden to Okinawa. Eiji Oguma noted that the typical practice of "othering" used in colonial domination produced the perception of a backward "Okinawa" and "Okinawans". Some like Tomiyama Ichiro suggest that for the Ryukyuans, being a member of the modern Japanese nation-state is "nothing other than the start of being on the receiving end of colonial domination".

In 1957, Kiyoshi Inoue argued that the Ryukyu Shobun was an annexation of an independent country over the opposition of its people, thus constituting an act of aggression and not a "natural ethnic unification". Gregory Smits noted that "many other works in Japanese come close to characterizing Ryukyu/Okinawa as Japan's first colony, but never explicitly do so". Alan Christy emphasized that Okinawa must be included in studies of Japanese colonialism.

Historians supporting the interpretation that the annexation of Ryukyu did not constitute colonialism make the following historiographical arguments

- that after the invasion in 1609 the Ryukyu kingdom became part of Tokugawa shogunate's bakuhan system, its autonomy a temporary aberration, and when was established the Okinawa Prefecture in 1879 the islands were already part of the Japanese political influence and it was only an administrative extension i.e. traced the annexation back to 1609 and not 1879.
- the establishment of Okinawa Prefecture was part of the Japanese nation-state integration, reassertion of authority and sovereignty over own territory, and that the Japan's colonial empire, dated from 1895, happened after the state integration and thus it can not be considered as colonial imposition.
- with the creation of "unified racial society" (Nihonjinron) of Yamato people it was created an idea that the Ryukyuan racial incorporation was natural and inevitable. Only recently the scholars like Jun Yonaha begun to see that this idea of unification itself functions as a mean of legitimizing the Ryukyu Shobun.

Some pre-war Okinawans also resisted the classification of Okinawa as a Japanese colony, as they did not want to consider their experience as colonial. This position originates in the prewar period when the Meiji suppression of Ryukyuan identity, culture and language resulted in self-criticism and inferiority complexes with respect to perceptions that Ryukyuan people were backward, primitive, ethnically and racially inferior, and insufficiently Japanese. (Note: Similarly considered in the Office of Strategic Services's report The Okinawas of the Loo Choo Islands: A Japanese Minority Group (1944) and Navy Civil Affairs Team's publication Civil Affairs Handbook: Ryukyu (Loochoo) Islands OPNAV 13–31. First, mostly based on Chinese and American sources, asserted: they were not innately part of Japan, there were notable mostly Chinese and less Korean influences and relations, were oppressed minority group that Japanese people perceived as their rustic cousins, no better than other colonial people, dirty, impolite, uncultured, with an Okinawan commoner stating that "the Okinawans have never felt inferior to the Japanese, rather the Japanese felt the Okinawans were inferior to them", others showing inferiority complex, or superiority complex mostly by former aristocracy or elite. Second, over 95% based on partisan Japanese sources, asserted: with mostly ignored historical aspects, were incorporated as part of Japan, but were innately culturally, socially and racially semi-civilized and inferior people that required structured American guidance in imperialistic sense, subservient to authority, men were lazy, have Ainu racial characteristic (meaning "primitive"), the aboriginal language is backward and so on. Although both represented them as distinctive ethnic minority, the first glorified the idea of U.S. resurrecting formerly independent polity, while the second that the U.S. could succeed, where Japan failed, in civilizing and modernizing the Okinawans by liberating them from themselves.) They did not want to be lumped together with the Japanese colonies, as evidenced by protests against being included with six other "less developed" colonial people in the "Hall of the Peoples" in the 1903 Osaka Expo.

Okinawan historian Higashionna Kanjun in 1909 warned the Ryukyuans that if they forget their historical and cultural heritage then "their native place is no different from a country built on a desert or a new colony". Shimabukuro Genichiro in the 1930s described the Okinawa's pre-war position as "colonial-esque", and in the 1920s he spearheaded a movement that supported the alteration of personal name spellings to spare Okinawans from ethnic discrimination. The anxiety about the issue of Okinawa being part of Japan was so extreme that even attempts to discuss it were discredited and denounced from both mainland and Okinawan community itself, as a failure of being national subjects.

In Eugen Weber's theorization about the colonies, according to Tze May Loo, the question of Okinawa's status as a colony is a false choice which ignores the complexity of Okinawa's annexation, in which colonial practices were used to establish the Japanese nation-state. He asserts that Okinawa was both a colony and not, both a part of Japan and not, and that this dual status is the basis of the continued subordination of Okinawa. Despite its incorporation as a prefecture and not a colony, colonial policies of "un-forming" and "re-forming" Ryukyuan communities and the Okinawan's proximity to other Japanese colonial subjects were coupled with persistent mainland discrimination and exploitation which reminded them of their unequal status within the Japanese nation-state. They had no choice but to consider their inclusion in the Japanese nation-state as natural in hopes of attaining legitimacy and better treatment. According to Loo, Okinawa is in a vicious circle where Japan does not admit its discrimination against Okinawa, while Okinawans are forced to accept unfair conditions for membership in the country of Japan, becoming an internal colony without end.

== Motives ==
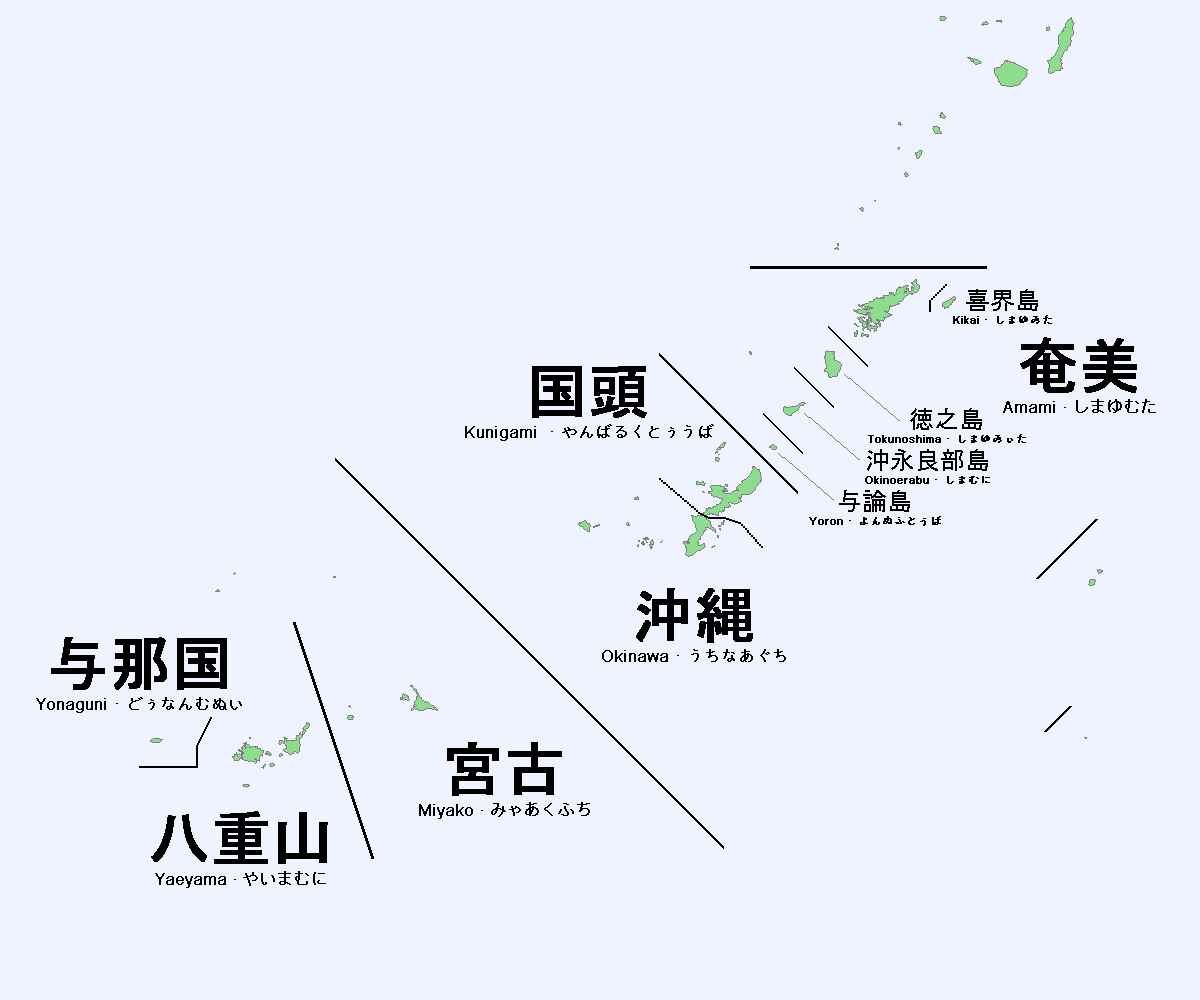
Map of the Ryukyuan languages

During the Meiji period there was a significant reimagining of the histories of Ryukyu and of Ezo, which was annexed at the same time, and an insistence that the non-Japonic Ainu of Hokkaidō and the Japonic Ryukyuan people were Japanese, both racially/ethnically and linguistically/culturally, going back many centuries, despite the evidence they were a significantly different group of people. The primary institution for assimilation was the state education system, which by 1902 occupied over half of the prefectural revenue, and produced a collective identity as well as training Okinawan teachers and intellectuals who would become a front Japanese nationalistic Okinawan elite.

Maehira Bokei noted that this narrative considered Okinawa a colony and rejected Okinawa's characteristic culture, considering it barbaric and inferior. This resulted in the development of an inferiority complex amongst Okinawans, which motivated them to discriminate against their own cultural heritage. However, the state did valorize and protect some aspects like being "people of the sea", folk art (pottery, textiles) and architecture, although it defined these cultural elements as being Japonic in essence. The Okinawan's use of heritage as a basis for political identity in the post-war period was interesting to the occupying United States forces who decided to support the pre-1879 culture and claims to autonomy in hopes that their military rule would be embraced by the population. (Note: The U.S. Office of Strategic Services's 1944 report considered the division between Okinawans and Japanese for the use in the conflict. They noted that probably could not find support among the Okinawans who were educated in Japan because of the nationalist indoctrination, the small Ryukyuan aristocratic class felt pride for not being Japanese and their association with China, the farmers were ignorant of the history and Japan due to lack of education, with the most potential in urban Okinawan population who still remembered and hated the prejudical Japanese behavior. Thus the U.S. during the occupation, instead of the Japanese term Okinawa, promoted the use of the older and Chinese term Ryukyu or Loo Choo, wrongly thinking it is indigenous (it is Uchinaa), and underestimated the Japan's prewar assimilation program with its Japanese identity and negative connotations for the Ryukyu identity.)

Many Ryukyuan people see themselves as an ethnically separate and different people from the Japanese, with a unique and separate cultural heritage. They see a great difference between themselves and the mainland Japanese people, and many feel a strong connection to Ryukyuan traditional culture and the pre-1609 history of independence. There is strong criticism of the Meiji government's assimilation policies and ideological agenda. According to novelist Tatsuhiro Oshiro, the "Okinawa problem" is a problem of culture which produced uncertainty in the relations between Okinawans and mainland Japanese: Okinawans either want to be Japanese or distinct, mainland Japanese either recognize Okinawans as part of their cultural group or reject them, and Okinawa's culture is treated as both foreign and deserving of repression, as well as being formally considered as part of the same racial polity as Japan.

=== Ideology ===
According to Yasukatsu Matsushima, Professor of Ryukoku University and the representative of the civil group "Yuimarle Ryukyu no Jichi" ("autonomy of Ryukyu"), the 1879 annexation was illegal and cannot be justified on either moral grounds or international law, as the Ryukyu government and people did not agree to join Japan and there is no existing treaty transferring sovereignty to Japan. He notes that the Kingdom of Hawaii was in a similar position, at least the U.S. admitted illegality and issued an apology in 1992, but Japan has never apologized or considered compensation. Japan and the United States are both responsible for the colonial status of Okinawa – used first as a trade negotiator with China, later as a place to fight battles or establish military bases. After the 1972 return to Japan, the government economic plans to narrow the gap between Japanese and Okinawans were opportunistically abused by the Japanese enterprises of construction, tourism, and media which restricted living space on the island, and many Okinawans continue to work as seasonal workers, with low wages while women were overworked and underpaid. Dependent on the development plan, they were threatened with decrease of financial support if they expressed opposition to the military bases (which occurred in 1997 under Governor Masahide Ōta, and in 2014 as a result of Governor Takeshi Onaga's policies). As a consequence of campaigns to improve soil quality on Okinawa, many surrounding coral reefs were destroyed.

According to Matsushima, the Japanese people are not aware of the complexities of the Okinawan situation. The Japanese pretend to understand it and hypocritically sympathize with Okinawans, but until they understand that the U.S. bases as incursions on Japanese soil, and that the lives and land of the Okinawans have the same value as their own, the discrimination will not end. Also, as long Okinawa is part of Japan, the United States military bases will not leave, because it is Japan's intention to use Okinawa as an island military base, seen from the Emperor Hirohito's "Imperial Message" (1947) and US-Japan Security Treaty valid from 1952.

Even further, it is claimed that Okinawa Prefecture's status violates Article 95 of Japanese constitution – a law applicable to one single entity can not be enacted by National Diet without the consent of the majority of the population in the entity (ignored during the implementation of financial plan from 1972, as well in 1996 legal change of law about the stationing of military bases). The constitution's Article 9 (respect for the sovereignty of the people) is violated by the stationing of American military troops, as well as the lack of protection for civilians' human rights. The 1971 Okinawa Reversion Agreement is deemed illegal – according to international law, the treaty is limited to Okinawa Prefecture as a political entity, while Japan and U.S. also signed a secret treaty according to which the Japanese state cannot act inside the U.S. military bases. Thus, if the reversion treaty is invalid the term "citizens" does not refer to the Japanese, but Okinawans. According to the movement's goals, independence does not mean the revival of the Ryukyu Kingdom, or a reversion to China or Japan, but the establishment of a new and modern Ryukyuan state.

== History ==
The independence movement was already under investigation by the U.S. Office of Strategic Services's in their 1944 report. They considered it as an organization emerging primarily among Okinawan's emigrants, specifically in Peru, because the territory of Ryukyu and its population were too small to make the movement's success attainable. They noted the long relationship between China and Ryukyu Kingdom, saw the Chinese territorial claims as justified, and concluded that the exploitation of the identity gap between Japan and Ryukyu made for good policy for the United States. George H. Kerr argued that U.S. should not see Ryukyu Islands as Japanese territory. He asserted that the islands were colonized by Japan, and in an echo to Roosevelt's Four Freedoms, concluded that because Matthew C. Perry's visit in 1853 the U.S. treated the Ryukyu as independent kingdom, they should re-examine Perry's suggestion about maintaining Ryukyu as an independent nation with international ports for international commerce.

There was pressure after 1945, immediately following the war during the United States Military Government of the Ryukyu Islands (1945–1950), for the creation of an autonomous or independent Ryukyu Republic. According to David John Obermiller, the initiative for independence was ironically inspired from mainland. In February 1946, the Japanese Communist Party in its message welcomed a separate administration and supported Okinawa's right to liberty and independence, while the Okinawan organization of leftist leaning intellectuals Okinawajin Renmei Zenkoku Taikai, residing in Japan, also unanimously supported independence from Japan.

In 1947, the three newly formed political parties Okinawa Democratic League-ODL (formed by Genwa Nakasone, conservative), Okinawan People's Party-OPP (formed by Kamejiro Senaga, leftist), and smaller Okinawa Socialist Party-OSP (formed by Ogimi Chotoku) welcomed the U.S. military as an opportunity to free Okinawa from Japan, considering independence from Japan as a republic under guardianship of U.S. or United Nations trusteeship. Common people also perceived the U.S. troops as liberators. OPP also considered endorsing autonomy, as well as a request for compensation from Japan, and even during the 1948–1949 crisis, the question of reversion to Japanese rule was not a part political discourse. The governor of the island of Shikiya Koshin, probably with support by Nakasone, commissioned a creation of Ryukyuan flag, which was presented on 25 January 1950. The only notable Ryukyuan who advocated reversion between 1945 and 1950 was the mayor of Shuri, Nakayoshi Ryoko, who permanently left Okinawa in 1945 after receiving no public support for his reversion petition.

In elections in late 1950, the Democratic League (then titled Republican Party) was defeated by the Okinawa Social Mass Party (OSMP), formed by Tokyo University graduates and schoolteachers from Okinawa who were against the U.S. military administration and advocated return to Japan. Media editorials in late 1950 and early 1951, under Senaga's control, criticized the OSMP (pro-reversion) and concluded that U.S. rule would be more prosperous than Japanese rule for Ryukyu. In February 1951, at the Okinawa Prefectural Assembly, the pro-U.S. conservative Republican Party spoke for independence, Okinawa Socialist Party for a U.S. trusteeship, while the OPP (previously pro-independence) and OSMP advocated for reversion to Japan, and in March the Assembly made a resolution for reversion.

"Ethnic pride" played a role in public debate as enthusiasm for independence disappeared, and as the majority were in favor of reversion to Japan, which began to be viewed as the "home country" because of a return to the collective perception of Okinawans as part of the Japanese identity, as promulgated in the 19th century education system and repression, effectively silencing the movement for Okinawan self-determination. According to Moriteru Arasaki (1976), the question of self-determination was too easily and regrettably replaced by the question of preference for U.S. or Japanese dominion, a debate which emphasized Okinawan ethnic connections with the Japanese as opposed to their differences. Throughout the period of formal American rule in Okinawa, there were series of protests (including the Koza riot) against U.S. land policy and against the U.S. military administration. In 1956, one-third of the population advocated for independence, another third for being part of the United States, and final third for maintaining ties with Japan.

Despite the desire of many inhabitants of the islands for some form of independence or anti-reversionism, the massive popularity of reversion supported the Japanese government's decision to establish the Okinawa Reversion Agreement, which put the prefecture back under its control. Some consider the 1960s anti-reversionism was different from the 1950s vision of independence because it did not endorse any political option for another nation-state patronage. Arakawa's position was more intellectual rather than political, which criticized Japanese nationalism (in counterposition to Okinawan subjectivity) and fellow Okinawans' delusions about the prospects of full and fair inclusion in Japanese state and nation, which Arakawa believed would only perpetuate further subjugation. In November 1971, information was leaked that the reversion agreement would ignore the Okinawans' demands and that Japan was collaborating with the United States to maintain a military status quo. A violent general strike was organized in Okinawa, and in February 1972 Molotov cocktails were hurled the Japanese government office building on Okinawa.

Since 1972, because of a lack of any anticipated developments in relation to the US-Japan alliance, committed voices have turned once again towards the aim of "Okinawa independence theory", on the basis of cultural heritage and history, at least by poets and activists like Takara Ben and Shoukichi Kina, and on a theoretical level in academic journals. Between 1980 and 1981 leading Okinawan intellectuals held symposiums about the independence, with even a drafted constitution and another national flag for Ryukyus, with the collected essays published with the title Okinawa Jiritsu he no Chosen (The Challenges Facing Okinawan Independence). The Okinawan branch of NHK and newspaper Ryūkyū Shimpō sponsored a forum for the discussion of reversion, assimilation to the Japanese polity, as well as the costs and opportunities of Ryukyuan independence.

=== U.S. military bases ===
Map showing the territory covered by military bases of the United States in Okinawa

Though there are pressures in the US and Japan, as well as in Okinawa, for the removal of US troops and military bases from Okinawa, there have thus far been only partial and gradual movements in the direction of removal.

In April 1996, a joint US-Japanese governmental commission announced that it would address Okinawan's anger, reducing the U.S. military foot-print and returning part of the occupied land in the center of Okinawa (only around 5%), including the large Marine Corps Air Station Futenma, located in a densely populated area. According to the agreement, both the Japanese and the U.S. governments agreed that 4,000 hectares of the 7,800-hectare training area are to be returned on condition that six helipads would be relocated to the remaining area. So far, July 2016, only work on two helipads has been completed. In December 2016, U.S. military announced the return of 17% of American-administered areas.

However, while initially considered as a positive change, in September 1996 the public became aware that the U.S. planned to "give up" Futenma for construction of a new base (first since the 1950s) in the north offshore, Oura Bay, near Henoko (relatively less populated than Ginowan) in the municipality of Nago. In December 1996, SACO formally presented its proposal. Although the fighter jet and helicopter noise, as well accidents, would be put away from a very to less populated area, the relocation of Marine Corps Air Station Futenma to Henoko (i.e. Oura Bay) would have a devastating impact on the coral reef area, its waters and ecosystem with rare and endangered species, including the smallest and northernmost population of dugongs on Earth.

The villagers organized a movement called "Inochi o Mamorukai" ("Society for the protection of life"), and demanded a special election while maintaining a tent city protest on the beach, and a constant presence on the water in kayaks. The governor's race in 1990 saw the emergence of both an anti-faction and a pro-faction composed of members from construction-based businesses. Masahide Ōta, who opposed the base's construction, won with 52% of the vote. However, the Japanese government successfully sued Ōta and transferred the power over Okinawan land leases to the Prime Minister, ignored the 1997 Nago City citizens' referendum (which had rejected the new base), stopped communication with the local government, and suspended economic support until Okinawans elected the Liberal Democratic Party's Keiichi Inamine as governor (1998–2006).

The construction plans moved slowly, and the protesters got more attention when a U.S. helicopter crashed into a classroom building of Okinawa International University. However, the government portrayed the incident as a further argument for the construction of the new base, and began to harm and/or arrest local villagers and other members of the opposition. By December 2004, several construction workers recklessly wounded non-violent protestors. This caused the arrival of Okinawa fishermen to the Oura Bay.

Prime Minister Yukio Hatoyama (16 September 2009 – 2 June 2010) opposed the base facility, but his tenure was short and his campaign promise to close the base was not fulfilled. The subsequent ministers acted as clients for the United States, while in 2013 Shinzō Abe and Barack Obama affirmed their commitment to build the new base, regardless of the local protests. The relocation was approved by Okinawa's governor in 2014, but the governor of the prefecture, Takeshi Onaga (who died in 2018), completely opposed the military base's presence. The 2014 poll showed that 80% of population want the facility out of the prefecture. In September 2015, Governor Onaga went to base his arguments to the United Nations human rights body, but in December 2015, the work resumed as the Supreme Court of Japan ruled against Okinawa's opposition, a decision which erupted new protests. In February 2017, Governor Onaga went to Washington to represent the local opposition to the administration of newly elected U.S. president Donald Trump.

=== Protests ===
Many protests have been staged, but due to the lack of a united political struggle for national independence, these protests have a limited political horizon, although some consider them to be an extension of the independence and anti-reversionist movement, replacing the previous reversion movement of the 1970s with anti-base and self-determination struggle. Nomura Koya claims that the protests are finally beginning to confront Okinawans with Japanese and American imperialism.

In September 1995, 85,000 people protested because of the U.S. military rape incident. This event is considered as the "third wave of the Okinawa Struggle" movement against the marginalization of Okinawa, the US-Japan security alliance, and the U.S. global military strategy. Beside being anti-US, it also had a markedly anti-Japanese tone. In 2007, 110,000 people protested due to Ministry of Education's textbook revisions (see MEXT controversy) of the Japanese military's ordering of mass suicide for civilians during the Battle of Okinawa. The journal Ryūkyū Shimpō and scholars Tatsuhiro Oshiro, Nishizato Kiko in their essays considered the U.S. bases in Okinawa a continuation of Ryukyu Shobun to the present day. The Japanese government designation of 28 April, the date on which the Treaty of San Francisco returned sovereignty over Okinawa to Japan, as "Restoration of Sovereignty Day" was opposed by Okinawans, who instead considered it a "day of humiliation". In June 2016, after the rape and murder of a Japanese woman, more than 65,000 people gathered in protest of the American military presence and crimes against the residents.

=== Recent events ===
The presence of the U.S. military remains a sensitive issue in local politics. Feelings against the Government of Japan, the Emperor (especially Hirohito due to his involvement in the sacrifice of Okinawa and later military occupation), and the U.S. military (USFJ, SACO) have often caused open criticism, protests, and refusals to sing the national anthem. For many years the Emperors avoided visiting Okinawa, since it was assumed that his visits would likely cause uproar, like in July 1975 when then-crown prince Akihito visited Okinawa and communist revolutionary activists threw a Molotov cocktail at him. The first ever visit in history of a Japanese emperor to Okinawa occurred in 1993 by emperor Akihito.

The 1995 rape incident stirred a surge of ethnic-nationalism. In 1996, Akira Arakawa wrote Hankokka no Kyoku (Okinawa: Antithesis to the Evil Japanese Nation State) in which argued for resistance to Japan and Okinawa's independence. Between 1997 and 1998 there was a significant increase in debates about Okinawan independence. Intellectuals held heated discussions, symposiums, while two prominent politicians organized highly visible national forums. In February 1997, a member of the House of Representatives asked the government what was needed for Okinawan independence, and was told that it is impossible because the constitution does not allow it. Oyama Chojo, former long-term mayor of Koza/Okinawa City, wrote a best-selling book Okinawa Dokuritsu Sengen (A Declaration of Okinawan Independence), and stated that Japan is not the fatherland of Okinawa. The Okinawa Jichiro (Municipal Workers Union) prepared a report about measures for self-government. Some considered the autonomy and independence of Okinawa to be a reaction to Japanese "structural corruption", and made demands for administrative decentralization.

In 2002, scholars of constitutional law, politics and public policy at the University of the Ryukyus and Okinawa International University founded a project "Study Group on Okinawa Self-governance" (Okinawa jichi kenkyu kai or Jichiken), which published a booklet (Okinawa as a self-governing region: What do you think?) and held many seminars. It posited three basic paths; 1) leveraging Article 95 and exploring the possibilities of decentralization 2) seeking formal autonomy with the right to diplomatic relations 3) full independence.

Flag of the Kariyushi Club

Literary and political journals like Sekai (Japan), Ke-shi Kaji and Uruma neshia (Okinawa) began to frequently write on the issue of autonomy, and numerous books about the topic have been published. In 2005, the Ryūkyū Independent Party, formerly active in the 1970s, was reformed and since 2008 has been known as the Kariyushi Club.

In May 2013, the Association of Comprehensive Studies for Independence of the Lew Chewans (ACSILs) was established, focusing on demilitarization, decolonization, and aim of self-determined independence. They plan to collaborate with polities such as Guam and Taiwan that also seek independence. In September 2015, it held a related forum in New York University in New York City.

The topics of self-determination have since entered mainstream electoral politics. The LDP Governor Hirokazu Nakaima (2006–2014), who approved the government's permit for the construction of military base, was defeated in November 2014 election by Takeshi Onaga, who ran on a platform that was anti-Futenma relocation, and pro-Okinawan self-determination. Mikio Shimoji campaigned on the prefecture-wide Henoko-referendum, on the premise that if the result was rejected it would be held as a Scotland-like independence referendum.

In January 2015, The Japan Times reported that the Ryukoku University professor Yasukatsu Matsushima and his civil group "Yuimarle Ryukyu no Jichi" ("autonomy of Ryukyu"), which calls for the independence of the Ryukyu Islands as a self-governing republic, are quietly gathering a momentum. Although critics consider that Japanese government would never approve independence, according to Matsushima, the Japanese approval is not needed because of U.N International Covenant on Civil and Political Rights for self-determination. His group envisions creating an unarmed, neutral country, with each island in the arc from Amami to Yonaguni deciding whether to join.

In February of the same year, Uruma-no-Kai group which promotes the solidarity between Ainu and Okinawans, organized a symposium at Okinawa International University on the right of their self-determination. In the same month an all-day public forum entitled "Seeking a course: Discussions of Okinawa's right to self-determination" was held, asserting that it was the right time to assume its role as a demilitarized autonomous zone, a place of exchange with China and surrounding countries, and a cosmopolitan center for Okinawa's economic self-sufficiency.

=== Chinese government views and influence operations ===
In July 2012, Chinese Communist Party-owned media Global Times suggested that Beijing would consider challenging Japan's sovereignty over the Ryukyu Islands. The Chinese government has offered no official endorsement of such views, but has permitted major commentators to espouse them. Some Chinese consider that it is enough to support their independence, with academic Zhou Yongsheng warning that Ryukyu sovereignty issue will not resolve the Senkaku Islands dispute, and that "Chinese involvement would destroy China-Japan relations". Academic June Teufel Dreyer emphasized that "arguing that a tributary relationship at some point in history is the basis for a sovereignty claim ... [as] many countries had tributary relationships with China" could be diplomatically incendiary. Academic Yasukatsu Matsushima expressed his fear of the possibility that Ryukyu independence would be used as a tool, perceiving Chinese support as "strange" since they deny it to their own minorities.

In May 2013, the official newspaper of the Central Committee of the Chinese Communist Party, People's Daily, published another similar article by two Chinese scholars from Chinese Academy of Social Sciences which stated that "Chinese people shall support Ryukyu's independence", soon followed by Luo Yuan's comment that "The Ryukyus belong to China, never to Japan". However these scholars' considerations do not necessarily represent the views of Chinese government. It sparked a protest among the Japanese politicians, like Yoshihide Suga who said that Okinawa Prefecture "is unquestionably Japan's territory, historically and internationally". In June 2013, The New York Times described the Chinese campaign "to question Japanese rule of [Okinawa and the Ryukyu] islands" as "semiofficial", noting that "almost all the voices in China pressing the Okinawa issue are affiliated in some way with the government."

In December 2016, Japan's Public Security Intelligence Agency claimed that the Chinese government is "forming ties with the Okinawan independence movement through academic exchanges, with the intent of sparking a split within Japan". The report was harshly criticized as baseless by the independence group professors asserting that the conference at Beijing University in May 2016 had no such connotations.

In August 2020, the Center for Strategic and International Studies (CSIS), a U.S. think tank, summarized that "China uses indirect methods to influence Japan. There are hidden channels, such as influencing Okinawa's movements through fundraising, influencing Okinawan newspapers to promote Okinawa's independence, and eliminating U.S. forces there." In contrast, the Okinawa Times and Ryūkyū Shimpō published articles denying Chinese funding. In light of the Okinawan newspaper articles, Tetsuhide Yamaoka, who supervised the Japanese translation of Silent Invasion written by Clive Hamilton, gave a lecture titled "Silent Invasion: What Okinawans Want You to Know About China's Gentry Craft" at the Urasoe City Industrial Promotion Center on 10 October 2020, organized by the Japan Okinawa Policy Research Forum. In his lecture, "Silent Invasion: How the CCP is working to make Okinawa Prefecture a dependency of China," Yamaoka stated that the CCP "uses indirect methods that are less visible, such as advertisements, rather than stocks, etc".

In October 2021, the French military school Institute for Strategic Studies (IRSEM) reported that China is stirring up independence movements in the Ryukyu Islands and French New Caledonia in an attempt to weaken potential enemies. It stated that for China, Okinawa is intended to "sabotage the Self-Defense Forces and U.S. forces in Japan."

There are also some people with official positions who, in their private capacity, openly believe that Japanese rule over the Ryukyus has no legitimacy. For example, Tang Chunfeng, a researcher at the Ministry of Commerce, has claimed that "75% of Ryukyu residents support Ryukyu independence" and that "the culture of the Ryukyu Islands was identical to that of the Mainland China before the Japanese invasion". However, despite the increase in the number of voices in China, it is generally agreed that this does not represent the viewpoint of the Chinese government, at least not the official position on the surface. However, these mainly private voices have elicited strong responses from the Japanese political establishment, such as Kan's statement that "Okinawa Prefecture is undoubtedly Japanese territory, both historically and internationally. In 2010, the Preparatory Committee for the Ryukyu Special Autonomous Region of China was registered in Hong Kong, with businessman Zhao Dong as its president. The organization is active in mainland China, Hong Kong and Taiwan, with offices in Shenzhen.

The preparatory committee has also been in contact with Taiwan's Bamboo Union and the Chinese Unification Promotion Party (CUPP), a political party of the reunification movement. In 2015, CUPP President Chang An-lo visited the organization's office in Shenzhen, and in the same month, CUPP leader Chang An-lo went on a sightseeing trip to Okinawa and was received by the cadres of the Kyokuryū-kai. Chang An-lo said that "the relationship between the Ryukyu and China is historically intertwined, and it is my duty as a Chinese to make Ryukyu free from Japan". In 2025, Mirror Media reported that China had attempted to promote Ryukyu independence by contacting the Okinawan syndicate Kyokuryū-kai through Taiwanese criminal organizations. The report alleged that Chang An-lo, a senior figure of the Bamboo Union and chairman of the Chinese Unification Promotion Party, was involved and had met with Kyokuryūkai members. Taiwan's National Police Agency later confirmed at a press briefing that Kyokuryūkai representatives had visited Taiwan in May 2023 and February 2025 at the invitation of local political–criminal groups. However, investigative authorities disputed certain elements of the report, including claims of drug-related profit inducements, noting that the full picture remains unclear. Taiwanese and Japanese security agencies are believed to be monitoring the situation closely in light of potential cognitive warfare efforts and attempts to encourage Ryukyu independence by China.

Against this background, the phrase "Today, Hong Kong; tomorrow, Taiwan" was quoted in Hong Kong and Taiwan during the Umbrella Movement, giving rise to the phrase "Today Hong Kong, Tomorrow Taiwan, Day After Tomorrow Okinawa" in Japan. Key leaders of the movement are reported to be supported by CCP united front influence operations.

On 3 October 2024, Nikkei Asia, in collaboration with a cyber security company, confirmed that there has been an increase in Chinese-language disinformation on social media promoting Ryukyuan independence, which are being spread by some suspected influence accounts. It is believed that the goal is to divide Japanese and international public opinion. In November 2025, during the 2025 China–Japan diplomatic crisis, the Global Times published an editorial on 19 November entitled "Why is the Study of Ryukyu Studies Necessary?", advocating "deconstructing Japan's one-sided narrative of the history of annexation", which questioned Japanese sovereignty over Okinawa.

Chinese social media users circulated unrelated videos of Japanese women, falsely presenting them as Indigenous Okinawans claiming the region is not part of Japan. The women in the original clips were simply discussing personal topics and made no remarks about Okinawa or sovereignty. AFP's verification shows the posts were manipulated, continuing a pattern of recurring disinformation targeting Japan's sovereignty over Okinawa.

==== Influence operations ====
Since the 2020s, the Chinese Communist Party (CCP) has intensified its diplomatic and information influence operations targeting the Okinawa Prefecture and the Ryukyu independence movement. In particular, following a remark by CCP general secretary Xi Jinping in June 2024 suggesting the "strengthening of exchanges between China and Okinawa," several government-affiliated institutions and pro-China scholars have escalated their assertions regarding the historical affiliation of Okinawa.

==== Information warfare ====
Propaganda claiming that "the Ryukyu Islands are not part of Japan but belong to the Chinese nation", and that "the people of Okinawa wish to return to China" has been widely disseminated via social media and video platforms. Much of this content is produced in Chinese and English and is aimed at foreign audiences. More than 200 such influence accounts have been identified.

The apparent purpose of these information operations is to exploit Okinawa as a perceived "weak point" in Japan, as a form of counterattack amid the Japanese government's criticism of China over issues such as Taiwan, Xinjiang, and Hong Kong.

==== Sovereignty claims by scholars ====
In 2024, Dalian Maritime University in Liaoning Province, China, planned the establishment of a “Ryukyu Research Center.” At a preparatory symposium held in September of the same year, Gao Zhiguo, president of the China Society of the Law of the Sea, and Xu Yong, professor at Peking University, argued that "the Ryukyu issue relates to national security and the reunification of the motherland." They rejected the legitimacy of the San Francisco Peace Treaty and questioned the scope of Japan's postwar sovereignty.

==== Exchanges with Chinese officials ====
Since 2023, there has been frequent contact between the Chinese Embassy and the Consulate-General in Fukuoka and the Okinawa Prefectural Government. This includes unprecedented exchanges, such as visits to Okinawa by top officials from Fujian Province and visits by Okinawan officials to the Chinese embassy.

During his visit to China in July 2024, Okinawa Governor Denny Tamaki told China's state-run Global Times that he wished to "convey Okinawa’s soul of peace to the world," emphasizing regional diplomacy. However, the nature of the personnel dispatched by China and their actions suggest strategic intentions including information warfare and efforts at division—realities that differ significantly from the notion of "peaceful exchange."

In October 2024, Chinese Ambassador to Japan Wu Jianghao visited Okinawa. During his stay, extraordinary security measures were implemented, including inspections of hotel rooms and background checks on drivers. Additionally, Yang Qingdong, who assumed the post of Consul General in Fukuoka that same year, does not speak Japanese and has a background in the Ministry of Foreign Affairs’ intelligence divisions and administration of the disputed South China Sea territory of Sansha City—indicating that China is deploying personnel with expertise in information and maritime strategy to Okinawa.

=== Polls ===
Ryukyu independence groups continue to exist, but they have not gained support large enough to lead to independence. The number of seats they were able to take in the local legislatures was either zero or, in rare cases, one. However, there is strong support for a strong local government with strong authority, such as the Dōshūsei and the Federalism such as UK.

In a 2011 poll 4.7% of surveyed were pro-independence, 15% wanted more devolution, while around 60% preferred the political status quo. In a 2015 poll by Ryūkyū Shimpō 8% of the surveyed were pro-independence, 21% wanted more self-determination as a region, while the other 2/3 favored the status quo.

In 2016, Ryūkyū Shimpō conducted another poll from October to November of Okinawans over 20, with useful replies from 1047 individuals: 2.6% favored full independence, 14% favored a federal framework with domestic authority equal to that of the national government in terms of diplomacy and security, 17.9% favored a framework with increased authority to compile budgets and other domestic authorities, while less than half supported status quo.

In 2017, Okinawa Times, Asahi Shimbun (based in Osaka) and Ryukyusu Asahi Broadcasting Corporation (of the All-Nippon News Network), newspapers who are subsidiaries of those in Japan, jointly conducted prefectural public opinion surveys for voters in the prefecture. It claimed that 82% of Okinawa citizens chose "I'm glad that Okinawa has returned as a Japanese prefecture". It was 90% for respondents of the ages of 18 to 29, 86% for those in their 30s, 84% for those aged 40–59, whereas in the generation related to the return movement, the response was 72% for respondents in their 60s, 74% for those over the age of 70.

On 12 May 2022, an Okinawa Times survey on the 50th anniversary of Okinawa's reversion to Japan and the attitudes of Okinawa residents showed that 48% of respondents wanted "a municipality with strong authority", 42% wanted to "maintain the status quo", and 3% wanted "independence".

=== Identity ===
In terms of identity, Okinawans have a composite identity. When asked, "What kind of person do you consider yourself to be?", 52% of the respondents said that they are "Okinawan and Japanese". When combining "Miyako" and "Japanese" as well as "Yaeyama" and "Japanese", the composite identity accounted for about 60% of the respondents. 24% said they were "Okinawan" and 16% said they were "Japanese". Regarding the promotion of culture in Okinawa, there is a view that it should learn from Wales in the United Kingdom regarding federalism and language revival. Since Okinawa was a minority in Japan, the history of Welsh Not and Dialect card in Okinawa, etc., are very similar. The composite identity is another area where Wales and Okinawa are similar.

Self-Identification of those born in Wales and Okinawa
| | Both (mixed) | Welsh / Okinawan | British / Japanese |
|---|---|---|---|
| Welsh-born | 44% | 21% | 7% |
| Okinawan-born (overall) | 54.5% | 26.2% | 16.1% |
| Okinawan-born (age 18–34 in 2023) | 65% | 18% | 18% |

There are also different views on whether Okinawa should become a state if the Doshu-sei is introduced in the future under the one state on the Doshu-sei in Japan. Author and former diplomat Sato Masaru, whose mother is from Okinawa, describes the uniqueness of Okinawan culture, including the Okinawan language. He favors federalism in Japan but not independence for the Ryukyus, and draws on his experience as a diplomat in the Ministry of Foreign Affairs to say, "It is possible for a country of about 1.4 million people to survive as an independent nation among three major powers, Japan, the United States, and China, but I think it will entail many difficulties."

During the Ryukyu Kingdom, the royal family lived in Shuri, Okinawa Island. Yaeyama and Miyakojima were subject to a harsh tax system, known as the poll tax. Therefore, it is believed that Yaeyama, Miyakojima, and Yonaguni Island introduced modern institutions, taxation system, and freedom to choose an occupation after the Meiji Restoration in Japan as a result of the Ryukyu dispositions.

Nakashinjo Makoto, editor-in-chief of the conservative Okinawan newspaper Yaeyama Nippo, said that Shuri Castle was more like a "symbol of oppression" to the islanders of the outlying islands. Therefore, he said, even if a "Ryukyu Republic" is founded, it may become a country full of discrimination like the Ryukyu Kingdom as it was in the past.

== See also ==
- Active autonomist and secessionist movements in Japan
- Amami reversion movement
- Racism in Japan
