= Masako Ganaha =

Japanese conservative political activist and freelance journalist

- 我那覇真子
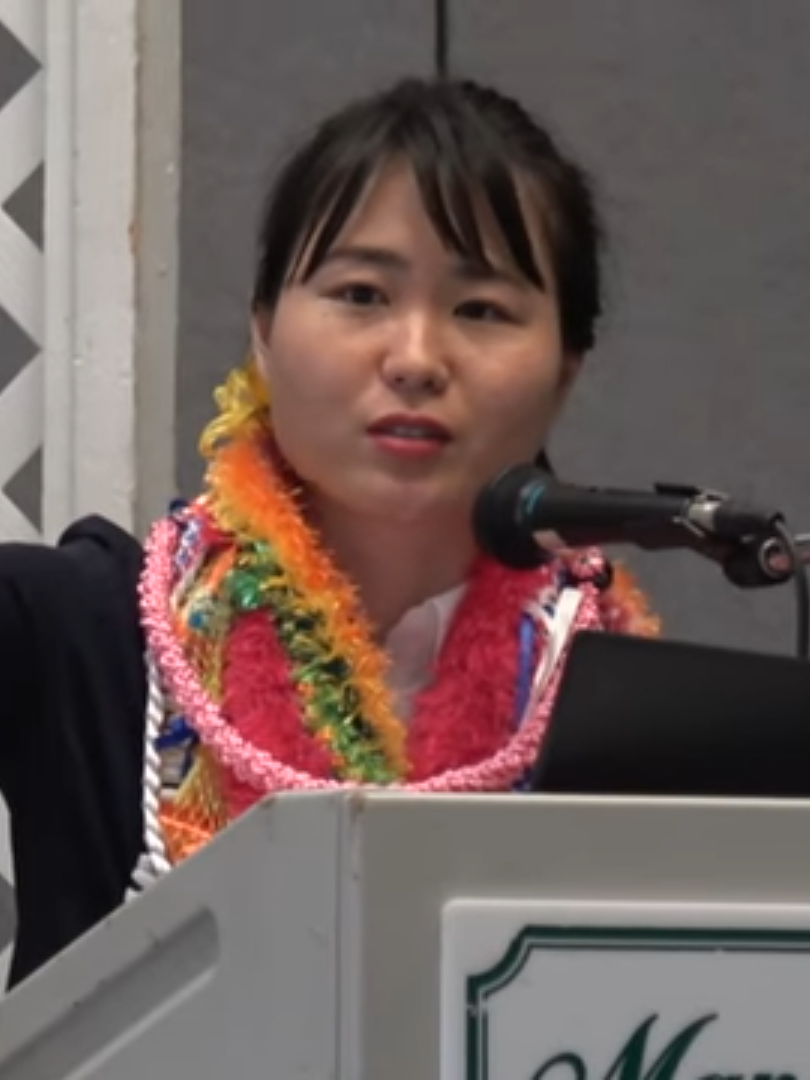
- Born: August 10, 1989 (age 37); Nago, Okinawa
- Education: Waseda University School of Human Sciences
- Occupation: Freelance journalist
- Years active: 2013–
- Organization(s): Citizens' and People's Association for Correcting the Ryukyu Shimpo and the Okinawa Times
- Title: Representative Operating Committee Member of Citizens' and People's Association for Correcting the Ryukyu Shimpo and the Okinawa Times; Broadcaster at Okinawa Branch of Nippon Culture Channel Sakura
- Movement: Conservatism
- Opponents: Ryukyu Shimpo (Note: She clearly states in her profile that, due to her family's business, they subscribe regularly.); Okinawa Times; Opponents of U.S. military bases in Okinawa
- Parent: Takahiro Ganaha (father)
- Relatives: Takao Ganaha (uncle); Takemitsu Ganaha (grandfather); Chiken Kakazu (uncle)
- Website: ganahamasako.com

Masako Ganaha (Japanese: 我那覇(がなは)真(まさ)子(こ); born August 10, 1989) is a Japanese freelance journalist and JSDF reservist. She is a representative operating committee member of the Citizens' and People's Association for Correcting the Ryukyu Shimpo and the Okinawa Times (琉球新報、沖縄タイムスを正す県民・国民の会). She is also an external advisor for the Sanseitō party.

== Background ==
She was born in Nago, Okinawa. Her father, Takahiro Ganaha, is an operating committee member of the Citizens' and People's Association for Correcting the Ryukyu Shimpo and the Okinawa Times. Her uncle, Takao Ganaha, was the co-representative of the "Okinawa People's Association for Straightening Out the Prefectural Government and Themselves," which was a separate action group of the "Correcting Association." Her grandfather, who claimed to be the originator of soki soba, was Takemitsu Ganaha, a former Nago City assembly member. Her uncle, (Note: Half-brother to Takao and Takahiro) Chiken Kakazu, was a former House of Representatives member.

She aspired to become an FBI special agent, and studied abroad in Ohio and California during her time at Okinawa Prefectural Nago High School in 2005. However, upon learning that U.S. citizenship was a minimum requirement for FBI special agents, she gave up on her FBI dream, returned to Japan, and dropped out of Nago High School. She subsequently obtained a high school equivalency diploma and entered the School of Human Sciences at Waseda University. While at university, she served as an executive committee member for the Japan Student Association Fund, which hosted the Prince Takamado Trophy All Japan Junior High School English Speech Contest. She graduated in March 2012. After graduation, she was set to join a publishing company, but changed her path due to differences in editorial policy. She returned to her family's home in Nago City to tutor children in English and dance and began her political activities.

On February 21, 2013, she delivered a speech advocating for the relocation of the Futenma Air Station to Camp Schwab in Henoko, Nago City, at a "Nago City Residents' Rally to Promote the Relocation of the Dangerous Futenma Air Station to Henoko." This marked the start of her engagement in public discourse.

In November 2013, based on her experience from speeches, and with the cooperation of Headline Co., Ltd., where she had interned during university, she established Yanbaru Press LLC and launched the local free paper "Yanbaru Press" (やんばるプレス). The content ranged from political topics, including interviews with Diet members, to local information titled Nago Beauty (名護美人, Nago Bijin). Despite receiving significant feedback and distributing all copies of the first issue, the paper was discontinued due to editorial differences with Headline Co., Ltd. Additionally, during the 2014 Okinawa gubernatorial election, she served as the public relations officer for the campaign of former Okinawan Governor Hirokazu Nakaima. In April 2015, she established the Citizens' and People's Association for Correcting the Ryukyu Shimpo and the Okinawa Times, which criticizes local newspapers in Okinawa. She has also contributed articles to Sekai Nippo, affiliated with the Unification Church. At the same time, she served as a caster for the Okinawa branch of Nippon Culture Channel Sakura.

Starting in December 2016, she, her father Takahiro, and her younger sister Mai began broadcasting two radio programs, "Okinawa Defense Information Bureau" and "Applied Psychology Radio Seminar," by purchasing airtime on a local community FM station. This subsequently became a subject of civil litigation. On January 2, 2017, she appeared on the "News Girls" (ニュース女子, Nyūsu Joshi) program (DHC TV), which became a matter of investigation by the Broadcast Ethics & Program Improvement Organization (BPO) following protests from opposition groups.

In October 2020, she traveled to the United States to cover the 2020 United States presidential election. She reported from the U.S. through her YouTube channel and other internet video channels remotely and stayed in the U.S. until March 2021, when she returned to Japan.

In May 2022, she gave an interview to Unification Church-affiliated newspaper 'Sekai Nippo', discussing the book 'Blackout' by black conservative activist Candace Owens, which she translated. She expressed her views on the black community in America, stating that "the Democratic Party implants a victim mentality, creating a scenario where they must vote for the welfare-oriented party."

== 2020 U.S. presidential election ==
=== Cornell University Library archive ===
Masako Ganaha was listed as one of the sources in a dataset on the arXiv archive site operated by Cornell University. This inclusion followed claims of election fraud that sparked widespread debate and raised concerns about trust in the election process. The topic remains a subject of discussion among various groups and perspectives.

== 2021 United States Capitol attack ==
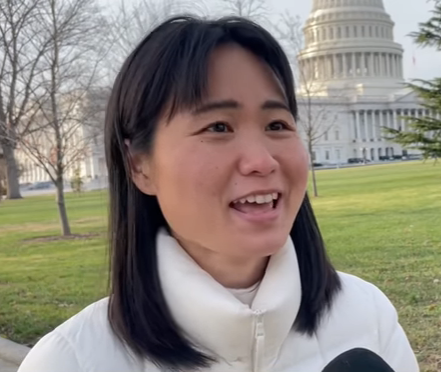
Masako Ganaha in 2020

She suggested that some individuals involved in the Capitol protest may have been associated with groups like Antifa and contributed to the unrest. While similar assertions were echoed by others, they were met with scrutiny and counterclaims from various fact-checking organizations. The topic has sparked debates and discussions, including in Japan, where related information has circulated widely. However, no official statement or clarification has been issued by her regarding these claims.

== Bibliography ==
=== Books ===
- Ganaha, Masako (January 27, 2016). Nippon o mamoru Okinawa no tatakai —Nippon no Jannu Daruku kaku katariki— 日本を守る沖縄の戦い ―日本のジャンヌダルクかく語りき― [The Battle to Protect Japan in Okinawa: Japan's Joan of Arc Speaks] (in Japanese). Aibas Publishing. ISBN 978-4-861-13616-0.
- Ganaha, Masako; Morgan, Jason (November 16, 2023). LGBT no katararezaru riaru: Nippon wa Amerika no higeki ni manabe! ＬＧＢＴの語られざるリアル：日本はアメリカの悲劇に学べ！ [The Untold Reality of LGBT: Japan Must Learn from America's Tragedy!] (in Japanese). Business-sha. ISBN 9784828425757.

==== Translations ====
- Owens, Candace (April 20, 2022). Burakkuauto: Amerika kokujin ni yoru, “Minshutō no arata na dorei nōjō" kara no dokuritsu sengen ブラックアウト：アメリカ黒人による、“民主党の新たな奴隷農場"からの独立宣言 [Blackout: How Black America can Make its Second Escape from the Democrat Plantation] (in Japanese). Translated by Ganaha, Masako. Hōjōsha. ISBN 978-4908925931.
  - Original work: Candace Owens (September 15, 2020). Blackout: How Black America Can Make its Second Escape from the Democrat Plantation. ISBN 978-1982133276.

=== Television ===
==== International ====
- New Tang Dynasty Television — December 24, 2020 — Journalist Masako Ganaha: "Japan Faces the Same Danger as the U.S."
- Fox & Friends — May 2, 2023 — Rahm Emanuel faces pushback in Japan for pushing 'LGBTQ ideology'

==== Japanese ====
- In Search of the Truth! (真相深入り！, Shinsō Fukairi!) Toranomon News (虎ノ門ニュース) (DHC Television) — October 27, 2015, April 13, 2016, August 31, 2016, February 23, 2017, March 22, 2017, May 31, 2017, June 22, 2017 (Special Program), July 4, 2017, October 10, 2017, November 28, 2017, December 12, 2017, February 6, 2018, February 13, 2018, April 24, 2018, May 22, 2018, July 24, 2018
- News Zap (BS-SKP) — September 29, 2016
- News Girls (DHC TV) — January 6, 2017 (VTR appearance)
- Hōgen BAR Leaks – Sake, Politics, Money, and Women – (DHC TV) —April 15, 2017, April 22, 2017

=== Web video ===
- Okinawa's Voice (Nippon Culture Channel Sakura) Okinawa branch caster (web distribution only)
- Masako Ganaha's Ookinawa (Nippon Culture Channel Sakura) — January 5, 2018

=== Radio ===
- Shinzo Abe and Yoshiko Sakurai, New Year Dialogue: "How to Build a Strong Japan" (新春対談：強いニッポンの創り方, Shinshun Taidan: Tsuyoi Nippon no Tsukurikata) (Nippon Broadcasting System) — January 1, 2018 (interviewer) (Note: Originally appearing with Abe, Sakurai, and Sae Nakai as part of the "Genron Sakura Group" project, also joined by Makiko Takita, the Prime Minister's Office reporter from Sankei Shimbun.)

== See also ==
- Satoru Nakamura
- Michael Flynn
