= Chinese expansionism =

Aspect of Chinese history

Evolution of Chinese territories in mainland China throughout Chinese history.

Territorial expansion took place during multiple periods of Chinese history, especially under the dynasties of Han, Tang, Yuan, and Qing.

== History ==
=== Qin and Han dynasties ===
China slowly became a major geopolitical power center during the ancient era. Various ancient Chinese dynasties enlarged their realms. However, it was only under the unified Qin dynasty that China truly started its process of expansion into other nations. Qin's expansionism led to its first contacts with the Xiongnu, the Yue tribes, and extended its reach to the Korean Peninsula.

The Han dynasty marked the height of early Chinese expansionism. Under Emperor Wu of Han, the Han China became the regional center of geopolitical influence in East Asia, projecting much of its imperial power on its neighbors. Han China managed to conquer northern Korea and northern Vietnam, annexing and incorporating several parts of these territories. The Han dynasty also managed to conquer various nomadic tribes as far north as what is now modern Mongolia and Siberia and gained control over western regions such as modern Xinjiang and parts of Central Asia.

Following the fall of the Han dynasty, northern Korea gained political independence from The Central Plain dynasties, leaving only northern Vietnam remaining under Chinese control, and the Three Kingdoms era temporarily halted Chinese expansionism. Nonetheless, the Cao Wei, Shu Han and Eastern Wu managed to extend its territorial gains in some parts under their territorial control. Once the Three Kingdoms ended and establishment of the Jin dynasty, Chinese expansionism halted for four centuries, as China was in dire need to consolidate back its borderland following its significant population losses.

The Sui dynasty, which reunified China after another 350 years of divisions, attempted to embark back on expansionism, but four disastrous campaigns to Goguryeo put the dynasty to an end.

=== Tang dynasty ===
The establishment of the Tang dynasty marked the comeback of Chinese expansionism. Like its Han predecessor, the Tang empire established itself as a medieval East Asian geopolitical superpower that marked another golden age for Chinese history. Tang China managed to maintain its grip over northern Vietnam and invaded northern Korea. The Tang empire also managed to extend its control over Xinjiang and Central Asia, reaching as far west as the Aral Sea, Caspian Sea and the Lake Baikal for several decades. China also gained loyalty from the Turkic and Sogdian tribes at the northern and western borders. The Tang managed to encroach into the Tibetan territory and occupy Lhasa, until they had to abandon such expansionist pursuits due to difficult climate.

The Tang Chinese expansion was checked following the Battle of Talas in modern-day Kyrgyzstan, when the Tang was defeated by the Arabs. However, China remained strong enough to process a significant weight until the An Lushan Rebellion which crippled the Tang. The rebellion partly led to the collapse and implosion of the Tang into several warring states and kingdoms. After the Tang collapse, China would be divided into several smaller nations until the unification during the Yuan dynasty and Mongol empire.

=== Fragmentation during Song, Jin, Liao dynasties ===
When the Tang dynasty collapsed, China entered the Five Dynasties and Ten Kingdoms period. After this period, China remained fragmented and was divided into a number of smaller countries that emerged from the turmoil. These included the Song dynasty to the south and the Liao and Jin dynasties to the north. The Song, Liao, and Jin would continue to fight each other for centuries. As a result of perpetual instability, the Vietnamese eventually seceded from the union in the Battle of Bạch Đằng in 938, Song dynasty, unified much of China's south and launched an invasion of northern Vietnam in the process, but was repelled by Lê Hoàn. From then, the Song dynasty had struggled to reconsolidate back the borderland and inner territories, as well as repeated wars with Vietnam, the Liao dynasty, the Jin dynasty and the Western Xia. This had prevented the Song dynasty from ever taking any serious military expeditions. These various kingdoms (Song, Liao, Jin, Xia) would fight each other until they were all conquered and unified by the Yuan dynasty in 1279.

=== Yuan dynasty ===
The Yuan dynasty, as a Khagan-ruled division of the Mongol Empire and an imperial Chinese dynasty, was founded by the Mongols in the traditional Chinese style in 1271. The Mongol Empire was characterized by unprecedented territorial expansionism north and west, reaching as far as Eastern Europe and the Middle East, although the Yuan dynasty based in China was unable to exert actual power over the west khanates due to the disintegrated nature of the Mongol Empire. The Yuan dynasty in China undertook attempts to conquer other territories further east and south too. It launched two invasions of Burma, with the first invasion delivering a devastating blow to the Pagan Kingdom and effectively resulted in its collapse. The Yuan dynasty also managed to conquer Korea and Tibet, thereby incorporating Tibet into Chinese territory for the first time in history. However, the Yuan dynasty had been unsuccessful in its attempt to conquer Vietnam, with the Mongols being repelled by Trần Thái Tông. Furthermore, The Yuan's naval expeditions to invade Java and Japan yielded disastrous results, eventually leading to the end of Sino-Mongol expansionist desires.

=== Decline during Ming dynasty ===
Following the collapse of the Yuan dynasty, the newly established Ming dynasty was initially reluctant to embark on expansionism due to destruction from rebellions in the waning years of the Yuan dynasty. The first Ming emperor, Hongwu, was openly against expansionism and was more concerned with killing his internal political opponents than dealing with outside threats. He specifically warned future Emperors only to defend against foreign barbarians, and not engage in military campaigns for glory and conquest. However, once Hongwu died, the reign of Yongle saw the Ming attempt to expand its territories. The Ming launched an invasion to Vietnam, eventually leading to the fourth Chinese domination. However, the Ming was defeated in the Battle of Tốt Động – Chúc Động 20 years later. Moreover, the Ming launched an attack on the Mongols and Northern Yuan to the north, but the Ming failed, and their emperors were even captured by the Mongols in the Tumu Crisis. Following its failures in Vietnam and the north, the Ming dynasty started to concentrate only in internal affairs, and refused to make further interventions or expeditions, except for naval expeditions and trades such as the Ming treasure voyages by Zheng He. Rather than expanding, the Ming was more defensive in nature and faced internal rebellions such as the Rebellion of Cao Qin and Bozhou rebellion as well as invasions from the north such as from the Later Jin (eventually the Qing) and the Japanese under Toyotomi Hideyoshi in the Imjin war.

=== Qing dynasty ===
The Qing dynasty was a Manchu-ruled dynasty, descended from the Jurchens which founded the Jin dynasty earlier. The dynasty embraced expansionism. By the late 19th century, in response to competition with other states, the Qing government of China attempted to exert direct control of its frontier areas by conquest or, if already under military control, conversion into provinces.

The ability of Qing China to project power into Central Asia came about because of two changes, one social and one technological. The social change was that under the Qing dynasty, from 1642, the Chinese military forces were organized around cavalry which was more suited for power projection than prior Chinese infantry. The technological change was advances in artillery which negated the military advantage that the people of the steppe had with their cavalry. The Dzungar Khanate was the last great independent nomadic power on the steppe of Central Asia. The Dzungars were deliberately exterminated in a brutal campaign during the Dzungar genocide by Manchu Bannermen and Khalkha Mongols. It has been estimated that more than a million people were slaughtered, and it took generations for it to recover. The Qing ruling family Aisin Gioro was supportive of Tibetan Buddhism and many in the ruling class adopted the religion.

The Qing dynasty was seen to be the return of Chinese expansionist policies. Under the Qing rule, China expanded beyond the Great Wall and started to annex more territories in the process. The Qing invaded Korea, managed to conquer Mongolia, and also annexed modern territories of Xinjiang and Tibet as well. The Qing also managed to extend its control into Central Asia for once more, mostly concentrated in what would be today Kazakhstan, Kyrgyzstan and Tajikistan. The Qing also destroyed the Kingdom of Tungning of Koxinga, and annexed Taiwan as well. This marked for the first time, China managed to directly control Xinjiang, Taiwan, Tibet, Central Asia and Mongolia. China also marked its claims far to Sakhalin, even though the Qing didn't manage to control it; or even to Kashmir where it fought a bitter war against the Sikhs.

Ming loyalists led by Koxinga invaded Taiwan and expelled Dutch colonialists from the island during the Siege of Fort Zeelandia and founded the Chinese Kingdom of Tungning. The Ming loyalists quickly moved to replace the institutions and culture of Dutch colonial rule with Han Chinese colonial rule. Language and religious institutions left by the Dutch were closed and replaced with Confucian temples and Chinese language schools for both Han Chinese and aboriginals. Officials encouraged new immigration of Han Chinese from China into territory further inland, turning aboriginal lands into new farmland. After fighting between the Ming loyalists and the Qing during the Revolt of the Three Feudatories, the Qing attacked the Kingdom of Tungning. the Qing won the Battle of Penghu and the Ming loyalists submitted to Qing rule. Tungning was annexed as part of Fujian. The Qing were "reluctant colonizers" but became convinced of Taiwan's value to their empire due to the threat the island posed if used as a base by rival powers, and by its abundant resources. The Qing turned Taiwan into its own province in 1885, after Japanese interest and a defeated French invasion attempt.

After the British expedition to Tibet in the waning days of the Qing dynasty, the Qing responded by sending Zhao Erfeng to further integrate Tibet into China. He succeeded in abolishing the powers of the Tibetan local leaders in Kham and appointing Chinese magistrates in their places by 1909–1910. Qing forces were also sent to Ü-Tsang in 1910 to establish a direct control over Tibet proper, though a province was never established in this area.

The Qing campaign against Burma (Myanmar) (1765–1769) was its most disastrous and costly frontier war. It ended in a military defeat but the Qing rulers could not accept Burma as an equal, and when diplomatic relations were resumed in 1790, the Qing court considered it a restoration of Chinese suzerainty.

The Qing dynasty established a tributary relationship with Joseon dynasty Korea following the Qing invasion of Joseon in 1636. In 1882, China and Korea signed the China–Korea Treaty of 1882 stipulating that Korea was a dependency of China and granted Chinese merchants the right to conduct overland and maritime business freely within Korean borders as well as the Chinese unilateral extraterritoriality privileges in civil and criminal cases. China also obtained concessions in Korea, such as the Chinese concession of Incheon. However, Qing China lost its influence over Korea following the First Sino-Japanese War in 1895.

=== Republic of China ===
When the Qing collapsed in 1912, the newly established Republic of China (ROC) claimed inheritance of all territories held by the Qing dynasty. When both Tibet and Outer Mongolia declared their independence, they were not recognized by the Republic of China. Most of the area comprising the present-day Tibet Autonomous Region (TAR) became a de facto independent polity except for border areas such as Amdo and Eastern Kham.

The Republic of China focused its efforts on consolidating their control over Chinese territories, however, faced numerous pressure from the expansionist Empire of Japan in 1915, with the Twenty-One Demands caused public uproars. It also faced strong opposition from the Soviet Union, which also embraced expansionist policy, leading to the border conflict of 1929. The Soviets and Japanese meddling into Chinese affairs and the lack of compromises from Western leaders over Japanese and Russian expansionism made the work difficult, as Russia had interests with regard to Xinjiang, and Japanese invasion in northeast China at 1931. On the same time, the Chinese Civil War also prevented any attempts of a possible Chinese expansion.

When World War II broke out, nonetheless Chiang Kai-shek had sought to restore Chinese influence. Being a major ally and one of the Big Four, Chiang wanted to restore Chinese influence in Korea and Southeast Asia, in a vision for a new Asia under Chiang's command. Once the World War II ended, Chiang Kai-shek started trying to implement the project, by sending troops to occupy northern Vietnam. Later, as the Chinese Civil War resumed, Chiang had to redeploy most of his army to fight the now-stronger communist force inside the border. In 1949, the government of Republic of China lost the war and was forced to retreat to Taiwan where it continues to rule today.

=== People's Republic of China ===
Following the de facto end of the Chinese Civil War, Chairman of the Chinese Communist Party Mao Zedong proclaimed the People's Republic of China (PRC) in 1949 and incorporated Xinjiang after absorbing the Second East Turkestan Republic, which had rebelled against the ROC with help from the Soviet Union before the latter switched side.

The PRC annexed Tibet through a series of events that involved negotiations with the Government of Tibet, a military conflict in the Chamdo area of western Kham in October 1950, and the Seventeen Point Agreement, which was ratified by the 14th Dalai Lama in October 1951 but later repudiated.

The Five Fingers of Tibet was a territorial claim attributed to Mao Zedong that considers Tibet to be China's right hand palm, with five fingers on its periphery: Ladakh, Nepal, Sikkim, Bhutan, and North-East Frontier Agency (now known as Arunachal Pradesh) that are considered China's responsibility to "liberate". The policy has never been discussed in official Chinese public statements and is now dormant, but concerns have often been raised over its possible continued existence or revival.

Following Dalai Lama's escape to India, China and India fought a border war in 1962, where China gained Aksai Chin and stampeded into Arunachal Pradesh (called South Tibet in China), before retreating from the latter over increasing turmoil. Before that, China also sought to take over Taiwan, then under the authority of the rival Republic of China, causing the Second Taiwan Strait Crisis, but was unsuccessful due to American threats in response. China also sought to take over Sikkim in 1967, but it was unsuccessful. A Chinese map published in 1961 showed China claiming territories in Bhutan, Nepal and the Kingdom of Sikkim. Incursions by Chinese soldiers and Tibetan herdsmen allying with the Chinese government also provoked tensions in Bhutan.

In 1974, China launched its first naval expedition to reclaim the Paracel Islands and defeated the 50-strong South Vietnamese occupation force. Tensions triggered between China and later unified communist Vietnam led to the Sino-Vietnamese War of 1979. China and Vietnam later fought another bitter skirmish in the South China Sea in 1988, resulting in China's consolidation of some disputed islands.

The PRC's stated goal of unification with Taiwan is often perceived as an expansionist endeavor with geostrategic significance for the PRC, allowing it to break out of the first island chain and increase the country's strategic depth.

== See also ==
- Chinese Empire
- Chinese imperialism
- Chinese irredentism
  - Annexation of Tibet by the People's Republic of China
  - Senkaku Islands dispute
- Chinese salami slicing strategy
- East China Sea EEZ disputes
- Territorial disputes in the South China Sea
- Territorial disputes of the People's Republic of China
- Preparatory Committee for the Ryukyu Special Autonomous Region of China
