= Chang An-lo =

Taiwanese Chinese ultranationalist

- 張安樂
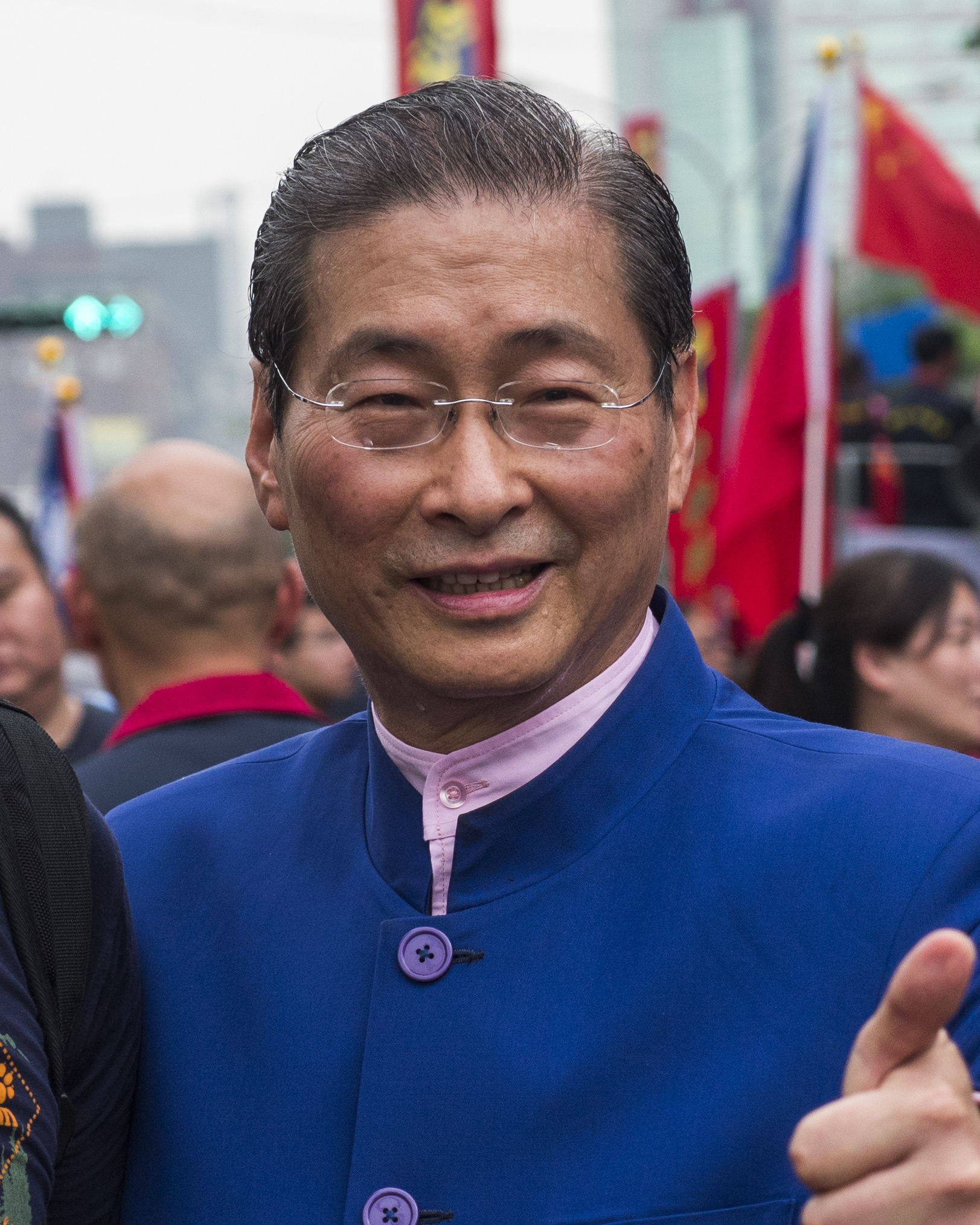
- Chang in 2017
- Born: 13 March 1948 (age 78); Nanjing, Jiangsu, China
- Other name: The White Wolf
- Education: Tamkang University (BA); University of Nevada, Las Vegas (BS); Stanford University (MS); Saint Mary's College of California (BA, BA)
- Political party: Chinese Unification Promotion Party; Chinese Democratic Progressive Party (honorary leader)
- Criminal charges: Drug smuggling

Chang An-lo (Chinese: 張安樂; pinyin: Zhāng Ānlè; born 13 March 1948), also known as the White Wolf (白狼; Bái Láng), is a Taiwanese Chinese ultranationalist, organized crime figure, entrepreneur, and politician. He is supportive of Chinese unification and founded the Chinese Unification Promotion Party.

== Early life and education ==
Chang was born on 13 March 1948 in Nanjing. His family fled with the Kuomintang government during the Great Retreat. In 1959, Chang's family settled in Taipei.

Chang graduated from Tamkang University with a degree in history. In 1979, he went to the U.S. to pursue graduate studies. He majored in management information systems and accounting at the University of Nevada, Las Vegas. He later recalled that "at that time, I wanted to learn something practical, maybe get a PhD and then go to the Chinese mainland". He then remained in the U.S. to study for a master's degree in operations research at Stanford University. Although he did not complete that program, The Diplomat reported in 2017 that he has "several degrees from universities, including Stanford". While in prison, he earned two more bachelor's degrees.

== Organized crime career ==
In 1985, Chang was convicted and incarcerated in the United States for ten years for drug smuggling, kidnapping, and extortion. While in custody, he cooperated with the Federal Bureau of Investigation (FBI) and provided tapes that revealed how Taiwanese military intelligence directed the Bamboo Union to use violence against dissidents of the Kuomintang during martial law in Taiwan. He remained in prison for 10 years.

A former leader of the Bamboo Union crime brotherhood, Chang fled Taiwan in 1996 after being placed on the wanted list by authorities in Taipei for involvement in organized crime, leading him to live in exile in Shenzhen, People's Republic of China. In 1996, Chang took a take in Strategic Sports, manufacturer of sport and motorcycle helmets that supplies Chinese police. Chang is credited with giving the Bamboo Union a political mission and a romantic character which has made it more appealing to gain members from rival criminal gangs.

During his time in China, the Chinese Unity Promotion Party was founded in 2004. He then started a Taiwan-based branch of the party in 2005. He returned to Taiwan in June 2013 and was arrested by Taiwanese police on arrival at Songshan Airport and released on bail. President Ma Ying-jeou received criticism for his lax treatment of Chang.

== Political activity ==
Upon his return to Taiwan, Chang opened a campaign headquarters affiliated with the "Chinese Unification Promotion Party" in downtown Tainan in order to prepare for elections in 2016.

Following a police raid of one of the party's headquarters in November 2013, police stated their concerns about the political party's links to organized crime to the press. Police alleged that the political party was being used as a front for membership in the Bamboo Union gang in New Taipei City; police also allege that illegal firearms had been trafficked and used in racketeering and turf war by the Yeh Shih branch (named after historical figure Ye Shi).

In 2013, his party claims that it has a membership of 20,000 persons, and 75 branch-offices (or headquarters).

A supporter of the Ryukyu independence movement, in 2015, Chang went on a sightseeing trip to Okinawa and was received by the Kyokuryū-kai. Chang said that "the relationship between the Ryukyu and China is historically intertwined, and it is my duty as a Chinese to make Ryukyu free from Japan".

Taipei Times reported his February 2019 protest against Su Tseng-chang who promised "that in the event of an attack by China, he [Su] would never surrender". Chang An-lo and his party members brought a prop casket to give to Su, saying that Su "should not call for resistance to a Chinese military invasion, because that would result in many Taiwanese fatalities." Chang later tripped and stumbled into the casket. In August 2019, Chang was arrested by Taiwanese police and prosecutors charged him and five party workers with taking illicit political donations, embezzlement, and tax evasion.
