= Special Action Committee on Okinawa =

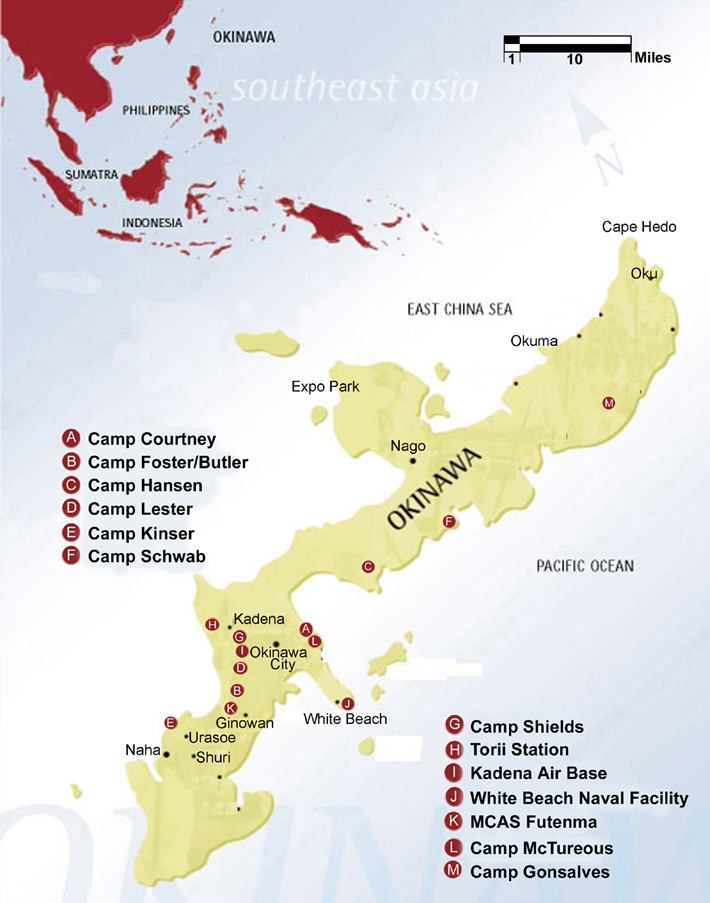
Map of Okinawa showing the locations of U.S. military installations.

The Special Action Committee on Okinawa (SACO 沖縄に関する特別行動委員会 (Okinawa ni kansuru tokubetsu kōdō iinkai)) is a formal agreement made between the United States Government and the Government of Japan.

== History ==
The U.S. and the Japanese government established the SACO agreement in November 1995. About 75% of land area of exclusive-use U.S. military installations in Japan exist on the island of Okinawa. The Agreement was brought on by a political uprising that escalated when an Okinawan schoolgirl was abducted and raped by three U.S. servicemen in September 1995.

== Purpose ==
The agreement's purpose was to reduce the impact of the U.S. military presence on the people of Okinawa. The SACO developed recommendations to realign, consolidate, and reduce U.S. facilities and adjust operational procedures.

== Agreement ==
In December 1996, the United States agreed to return 21% (about 12,000 acres (49 km^{2})) of the land in Okinawa from 11 U.S. military installations. The final report of the SACO outlines the requirements of returning land, adjusting training and operational procedures, implementing noise abatement procedures, and changing the Status of Forces Agreement (SOFA) procedures.

== Land to be returned ==
- MCAS Futenma
- About 9,900 acres (40 km^{2}) of the Northern Training Area (Camp Gonsalves)
- Aha Training Area
- Gimbaru Training Area
- Sobe Communications Site
- Yomitan Auxiliary Airfield
- Most of Camp Kuwae (Camp Lester)
- Senaha Communications Station
- Small portion of the Makiminato Service Area
- Naha Port
- Housing Consolidation on Camps Kuwae (Camp Lester) and Zukeran (Camp Foster)
