= 1971 Okinawa Reversion Agreement =

Agreement between Japan and the United States

The Okinawa Reversion Agreement (Japanese: 沖縄返還協定, Hepburn: Okinawa henkan kyōtei) is an agreement between the United States and Japan in which the US agreed to relinquish in favor of Japan all rights and interests under Article III of the Treaty of San Francisco, which had been obtained as a result of the Pacific War, and thus restoring Japan's full exercise of sovereignty over Okinawa Prefecture. The document was signed simultaneously in Washington, DC, and Tokyo on June 17, 1971, by William P. Rogers on behalf of US President Richard Nixon and Kiichi Aichi on behalf of Japanese Prime Minister Eisaku Satō. The document was not ratified in Japan until November 24, 1971, by the National Diet. The agreement finally took effect in 1972.

== Terms ==
The agreement is divided into nine major articles. The US agreed to return control of the Ryukyu Islands and the Daitō Islands (also known as Okinawa Prefecture) to Japan, if the US Armed Forces could occupy Okinawa as well as have access to its facilities. The Americans maintained a large military presence in Okinawa because its strategic location and intense fighting made it known as the Keystone of the Pacific during World War II.

Under the agreement, the Ryukyu and Daitō Islands would become subject to all existing and future treaties agreed upon between the Americans and the Japanese. The US would help to repair damage done to land seized by American administrations. The treaty also states that Japan would recognize actions taken by the US administration in those areas, and that the administration would not be held liable for criminal activity during its time of occupation. The Japanese government also agreed to pay the US government $320,000,000 over the next five years.

The goals of the agreement for the US were to transfer sovereignty, ensure that the US could help a democratic government, and ensure that Japan would not be able to endanger the peace.

== Negotiations ==
The reversion of Okinawa back to Japan was met with several complications between American and Japanese diplomats. Many diplomats met with each other and wanted to solve the issues between the two countries, but complications and conflicting interests made reversion problematic.

=== Early negotiations ===
Negotiations began between US Ambassador to Japan U. Alexis Johnson and Japanese Foreign Minister Kiichi Aichi in 1968. The two worked well together and established an effective working relationship in the hope of quickly coming to an understanding. The discussions moved slowly at first because Japan's primary concern was for a confirmed date of reversion, before agreeing upon the specifics of the agreement, which came to be known as the clean-slate policy. Aichi's active role in foreign policy helped make a breakthrough in negotiations when he suggested reversion by 1972, suggesting to Johnson that military bases could maintain all present freedoms until both governments agreed upon a gradual removal without any threat to regional security. In a following negotiation with Henry Kissinger, Kissinger stated that the military presence in Okinawa served as a deterrent to nuclear weapon development.

Morton Halperin outlined the American stance on the reversion. Firstly, regarding the removal of US nuclear weapons from Okinawa: If North Korea were determined to invade South Korea, the Americans' willingness to fire nuclear weapons to defend the South could deter the North from invading at all. The US was also concerned that reversion of Okinawa would be interpreted by others as retreating from Asia. The US considered Okinawa part of Japan and intended to revert sovereignty by 1972 but only if its concerns were completely dealt with by then.

=== US-Japan Kyoto Conference ===
At the US-Japan Kyoto Conference, Japan argued that keeping nuclear weapons in Okinawa would be redundant and that there were more suitable areas for military presence. Support from American specialists helped to persuade Americans the benefits of reversion. After the conference, a summary stated that the US had an official concern that Japan would support military resources with no forces to the US if there were a crisis in the Korean Peninsula.

=== Talks between Nixon and Kishi ===
Special Envoy Kishi met President Nixon with two preconceived desires. Japan sought reversion by 1972 with, at least, denuclearized US military bases. On April 1, 1969, Kishi told President Nixon that "many Japanese feel that if Japan is to play a greater role in Asia, it is quite unacceptable for part of their country to remain occupied by a foreign power." Kishi also believed that maintaining the status quo in Okinawa could risk political fallout. Nixon assured him that he was well informed about the topic and that relations between the US and Japan were important to him.

=== Final stages ===
The US had informed Japan that reversion was possible if in the event of an emergency, nuclear weapons were allowed in Okinawa. The issue was brought forth by the US as an ultimatum. Japan complied, but the ultimatum brought up complications on what was considered an emergency that warranted nuclear weapons. Although Japan did not believe such an emergency would ever occur, its goal for total denuclearization had failed. The US also sought for fair competition with Japanese wool textile manufacturers. Because economy and government are intertwined, the US pressed for regulations on wool manufacturers. Since the issue of reversion became tied to trade, top-secret discussions took place at the White House and ended with an agreement to meet with other countries concerning the General Agreement on Tariffs and Trade in which Japan promised to support the Americans' search for fair trade.

Both China (PRC) and Taiwan (ROC) criticized the reversion agreement because of their claim on the Senkaku Islands, which were included as part of the Ryukyu Islands returned to Japan, based on, among others, the ancient Chinese maritime logs, Voyage with a Tail Wind. Its references were judged insufficiently credible to validate their claim. The historical circumstances remain a subject of debate.

== Reaction in Japan ==
During the American administration, political currents favoring independence from both the US and Japan existed but remained highly marginal, while the massive popular support for the reversion movement among local inhabitants provided the crucial impetus for the Japanese government's negotiations to revert the prefecture to its administration. The document of agreement was not ratified in Japan until November 24, 1971, by the National Diet. However, it sparked controversy in both Okinawa and mainland Japan, largely over the terms of reversion—above all the continued U.S. military presence—rather than reversion itself. In Tokyo, a group of radical students discontent with American military presence in Okinawa rioted using Molotov cocktails and steel pipes, killing a police officer. The Koza riot was another example of the social unrest that took place in Japan during that time. American military forces reported that the reversion of Okinawa created a new and challenging environment for military forces to deal with.

== 40th anniversary ceremony ==
In 2011, Prime Minister Yoshihiko Noda visited Okinawa and gave a speech stating the Japanese government's support for Okinawa's self-reliant economic development to help improve the prefecture. He also acknowledged the burden that the military bases in Okinawa place on the islanders and claimed to continue trying to reduce the burden. Noda also said, "It is Okinawa that will be the driving force for Japan as a whole, creating a role for itself at the forefront of the Asia-Pacific era. It is we who are responsible for creating this future. There is no doubt that the aspirations of the people of Okinawa for peace, and their globally-minded spirit as a 'bridge between nations' will be a tremendous asset in the development and growth of Okinawa in the 21st century."

As of 2017, citizens in Okinawa continue to seek the removal of military bases and equal living standards with mainland Japanese citizens. Since the reversion, the inhabitants of Okinawa rely more on government investment for improvement, instead of American military spending.

== See also ==
- United States Civil Administration of the Ryukyu Islands
