= Koza riot =

1970 protest against the US military presence in Okinawa, Japan

Koza Riot
- Part of the Cold War
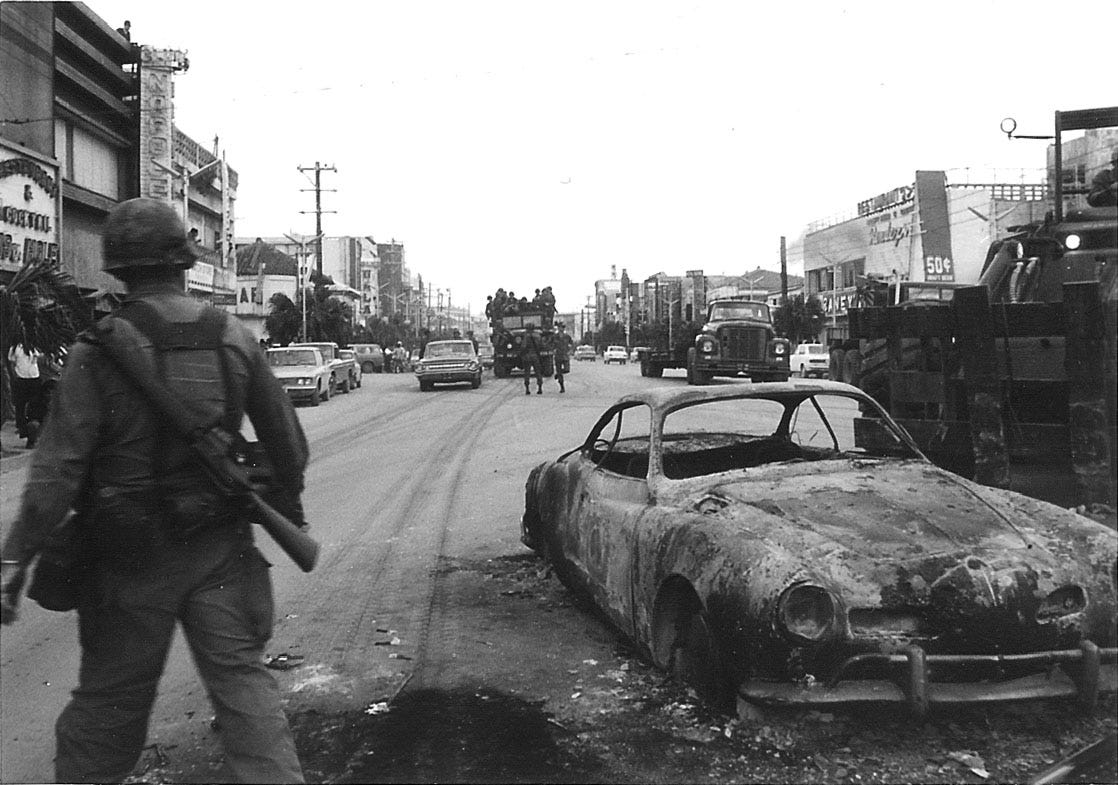
- A U.S. military serviceman stands near a burned Volkswagen Karmann Ghia in Koza, hours after the riot.
- Date: December 20, 1970
- Location: Koza, Okinawa
- Cause: Vehicular accidents involving pedestrians, resulting in chain reaction escalation; tensions & discontent over US military presence
- Participants: Okinawan people; American servicemen
- Outcome: 56–60 American servicemembers and 27 Okinawans injured; 82 people arrested

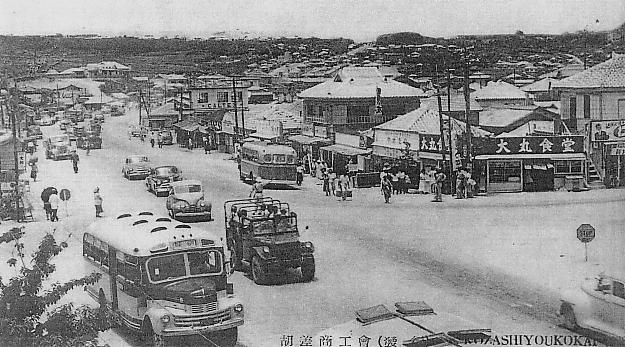
The site of the riot roughly 15 years prior, c. 1955.

The Koza riot (Japanese: コザ暴動, Hepburn: Koza bōdō) was a violent and spontaneous protest against the US military presence in Japan on the night of December 20, 1970 and into the morning of the following day in Koza, now part of the city of Okinawa. Roughly 5,000 Okinawans clashed with roughly 700 US military police officers in an event which has been regarded as symbolic of Okinawan anger against 25 years of US military administration. The immediate trigger was a US serviceman hitting an Okinawan man while drunk driving. In the riot, approximately 60 Americans and 27 Okinawans were injured, 80 cars were burned, US military police used tear gas, and several buildings on Kadena Air Base were destroyed or heavily damaged.

== Background ==
Following Japan's defeat in World War II, Japan came to be formally occupied by Allied forces and governed under martial law for roughly seven years. While the occupation of Japan came to an end and most of Japan regained its independence in April 1952, Okinawa Prefecture was to remain under US military occupation for another twenty years.

By 1970, it had already been decided and was widely known that the US military occupation of the Ryukyu Islands, of which Okinawa was the largest, was going to end in 1972, and that Okinawa would return to being a part of independent Japan, but also that a considerable US military presence was to remain. This came in the wake of a number of incidents between servicemen and Okinawan civilians over the years, including a hit-and-run crash in September 1970, only a few months prior to the riot, which resulted in the death of an Okinawan housewife from Itoman. The servicemen involved in that incident were acquitted at their court-martial. This incident fueled the growing discontent of Okinawans with the standard status of forces that exempted US servicemen from Okinawan justice.

== The riot ==
The riot lasted seven or eight hours, beginning in the early morning hours of December 20, 1970, and continuing past dawn. It is said to have erupted spontaneously without any planning from tensions which had reached a breaking point.

Around 1 o'clock that night, a drunk American serviceman hit an Okinawan man with his car on a road near a major entertainment and red-light district in Koza (now called Okinawa City), a short distance from Kadena Air Force Base. The Americans got out of their car and made sure the man was alright; he presently stood up and walked away. The four men were then about to get back into their car to leave the scene when they were confronted by a number of Okinawan taxi drivers who had witnessed the crash. A crowd began to form; some were shouting "no more acquittals", "Yankee go home" and "don’t insult Okinawans".

Two American military police vehicles also arrived, sirens blaring. While the newly arrived MPs attempted to extricate their comrades from the situation, the crowd had the victim lie down where he'd been hit, and had him reenact the incident. Many accounts emphasize that the newly arrived MPs ignored the man who had been hit, focusing only on extricating their countrymen.

Another American car arriving on the scene accidentally struck one belonging to an Okinawan, and as passersby and people from the neighborhood stopped to get involved, the crowd grew to around 700, began to throw rocks and bottles, and attempted to turn over the car involved in the original accident. Okinawan police were able to remove the American driver safely from the scene, but the confrontation continued to escalate.

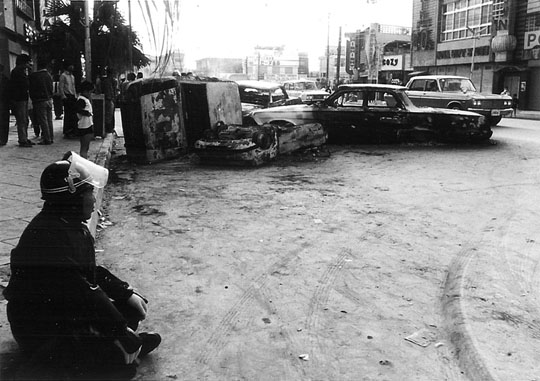
An Okinawan policeman surveys the damage hours after the riot

Warning shots were fired, attracting a larger crowd, which soon numbered around five thousand; the number of MPs on the scene was now around 700. The rioters broke into, turned over, and torched over seventy cars, and continued to throw rocks and bottles, along with Molotov cocktails assembled in nearby homes, bars, restaurants, and other establishments. The rioters pulled American servicemen from their cars and beat them, then burned their cars. Some of the rioters danced traditional folk dances as the riot continued around them; others passed through the gate into the Air Force Base, overturning and torching cars, breaking windows, and destroying property. About 500 rioters then broke the fence of Kadena Air Base, and razed the military employment building and the offices of the Stars and Stripes newspaper. The MPs began to deploy tear gas. The riot finally came to an end around 7 o'clock in the morning. In the end, many were injured, including 60 Americans and 27 Okinawans, and 82 people were arrested.

== Popular culture references ==
A song on the eponymous debut album of the Okinawa-based electronic duo Ryukyu Underground is entitled "Koza Riot".
