= Chinese Unification Promotion Party =

Political party in Taiwan

Chinese Unification Promotion Party 中華統一促進黨
- Abbreviation: CUPP
- President: Chang An-lo
- Chairman: Zhang Futang
- Secretary-General: Tang Zhongsheng
- First Vice Chairman: Zeng Zhengxing
- Second Vice Chairman: Li Zongkui
- Founded: 9 September 2005; 21 years ago
- Preceded by: Great Alliance for Defending China
- Headquarters: 2nd Floor, No. 150, Fuxing North Road, Zhongshan District, Taipei, Taiwan
- Membership (2017): 30,000 (self-claimed)
- Ideology: Chinese unification Chinese conservatism Anti–Taiwan independence
- Political position: Far-right
- National affiliation: Pro-Beijing camp
- Colours: Red, Blue, Yellow,
- Legislative Yuan: 0 / 113

Chinese Unification Promotion Party
- Traditional Chinese: 中華統一促進黨
- Simplified Chinese: 中华统一促进党
Transcriptions
Standard Mandarin
- Hanyu Pinyin: Zhōnghuá Tǒngyī Cùjìn Dǎng
Southern Min
- Hokkien POJ: Tiong-hôa Thóng-it Chhiok-chìn-tóng

Abbreviation
- Traditional Chinese: 統促黨
- Simplified Chinese: 统促党
Transcriptions
Standard Mandarin
- Hanyu Pinyin: Tǒng Cù Dǎng
Southern Min
- Hokkien POJ: Thóng-chhiok-tóng

The Chinese Unification Promotion Party (CUPP), (Note: In local languages: Traditional Chinese script: 中華統一促進黨; Mandarin Pinyin: Zhōnghuá Tǒngyī Cùjìn Dǎng) also known as the Unionist Party, (Note: In local languages: Traditional Chinese script: 統促黨; Mandarin Pinyin: Tǒng Cù Dǎng) is a minor far-right political party in Taiwan that promotes Chinese unification.

== History ==
In 2004, convicted drug smuggler Chang An-lo, with the help of the gang he formerly led, the Bamboo Union, established the Chinese Unification Promotion Party, while he was still living in China. He has continued to grow the party since returning to Taiwan in 2013.

In 2017, the party claimed to have over 30,000 members, many of whom were accused by authorities of having ties to organized crime, something Chang himself does not deny. Other sources have put their membership at approximately 60,000. Its personnel substantially overlaps with the Bamboo Union. CUPP advocates unification with the People's Republic of China under a "one country, two systems" arrangement.

In November 2024, a husband and wife couple affiliated with the CUPP and funded by the mainland Taiwan Affairs Office were indicted for contravening the Anti-Infiltration Act and election laws. The Ministry of the Interior stated that it would seek to forcibly disband the CUPP for engaging in espionage and illegal election interference on behalf of the Chinese Communist Party.

== Controversies ==
The controversy about the China Unification Promotion Party mainly revolves around its pro-Chinese Communist Party position, intimidating pro-democracy activists from Hong Kong and Pan-Green Coalition leaders in Taiwan, using the triad background of their members.

=== Attack on Lam Wing-kee ===
Lam Wing-kee, the owner of Causeway Bay Books, announced in September 2019 that he planned to re-open the store in Taiwan. Previously located in Hong Kong, but closed after Lam and several others were detained by authorities from mainland China, the store focuses on the history, social economy and other cultural related books of Hong Kong, Taiwan, and mainland China. The store publishes the works of dissident creators, and serves as a connection and mutual assistance base for people in Taiwan and Hong Kong, dedicated to preserving Hong Kong culture and promoting the free exchange of ideas and culture.

On 21 April 2020, Lam was splashed with paint by unidentified men while dining at a café. The Mainland Affairs Council posted on Facebook stating that Taiwan is a democratic country and cannot tolerate such behaviors. A self-proclaimed member of the Unionist Party left a message under the post, reading, "This is just our first warning to you, [we will] kill you in a matter of minutes" (這只是我們對你的第一次警告，搞死你分鐘的事). The New Power Party responded to the incident by urging the Taiwan government to dissolve and ban the Unionist Party. They also referred to the previous assaults against Joshua Wong, Denise Ho and other Hong Kong democrats conducted by members of the Unionist Party, and criticized the government for its inaction.

=== Banning proposal ===
The proposal to ban the Chinese Unification Promotion Party was first proposed by the Hong Kong Future Concern Group, a political organization based in Hong Kong, on 18 August 2017. In an open letter to 18 legislators of the Taiwan Parliamentary Concern for Hong Kong Democracy Alliance (all of them being members of either the New Power Party or the Democratic Progressive Party), the group made a number of demands, including declaring the Chinese Patriotic United Association (中華愛國同心會) and the Chinese Unification Promotion Party illegal organizations and arresting all related persons, as well as banning members of Hong Kong's pro-China political parties from entering Taiwan.

In 2020, the New Power Party's Legislative Yuan caucus proposed that the Ministry of the Interior transfer the Unification Promotion Party to the Constitutional Court of the Judicial Yuan for dissolution procedures. The ruling Tsai Ing-wen government, however, has not responded positively. The proposal by the New Power Party was even rejected by the then-ruling Democratic Progressive Party with 64 votes against and only 7 votes in favor.

Some Hong Kong residents in Taiwan are dissatisfied with the government's strict immigration requirements, imposed under the pretext of national security, while they simultaneously see tolerance toward parties that are pro-unification.

On 6 November 2024, the Ministry of the Interior believed that the party was likely to violate the free, democratic and constitutional order of the Republic of China, and therefore filed a petition with the Constitutional Court of the Judicial Yuan to dissolve the Unification Promotion Party in accordance with the Additional Articles to the Constitution of the Republic of China (中華民國憲法增修條文) and the Political Parties Act (政黨法). The government of the People's Republic of China condemned the petition.

Interior Ministry officials said the law does not protect key members of a political party from engaging in criminal activity, which is the most important red line. The United Front Party is the first political party to be referred to the case by the Ministry of the Interior, and the Ministry will continue to monitor other political parties with similar cases.

Zhu Fenglian, spokesperson for the Taiwan Affairs Office of the State Council of the People's Republic of China, strongly condemned this, saying that the DPP was suppressing patriotic unification forces on the island. The New Power Party responded to the Ministry of the Interior's 2024 action plan by expressing strong support and even stating that it was "long overdue." In July 2026, Taiwan's interior ministry said that it will petition the Judicial Yuan to dissolve the party.

== Gallery ==
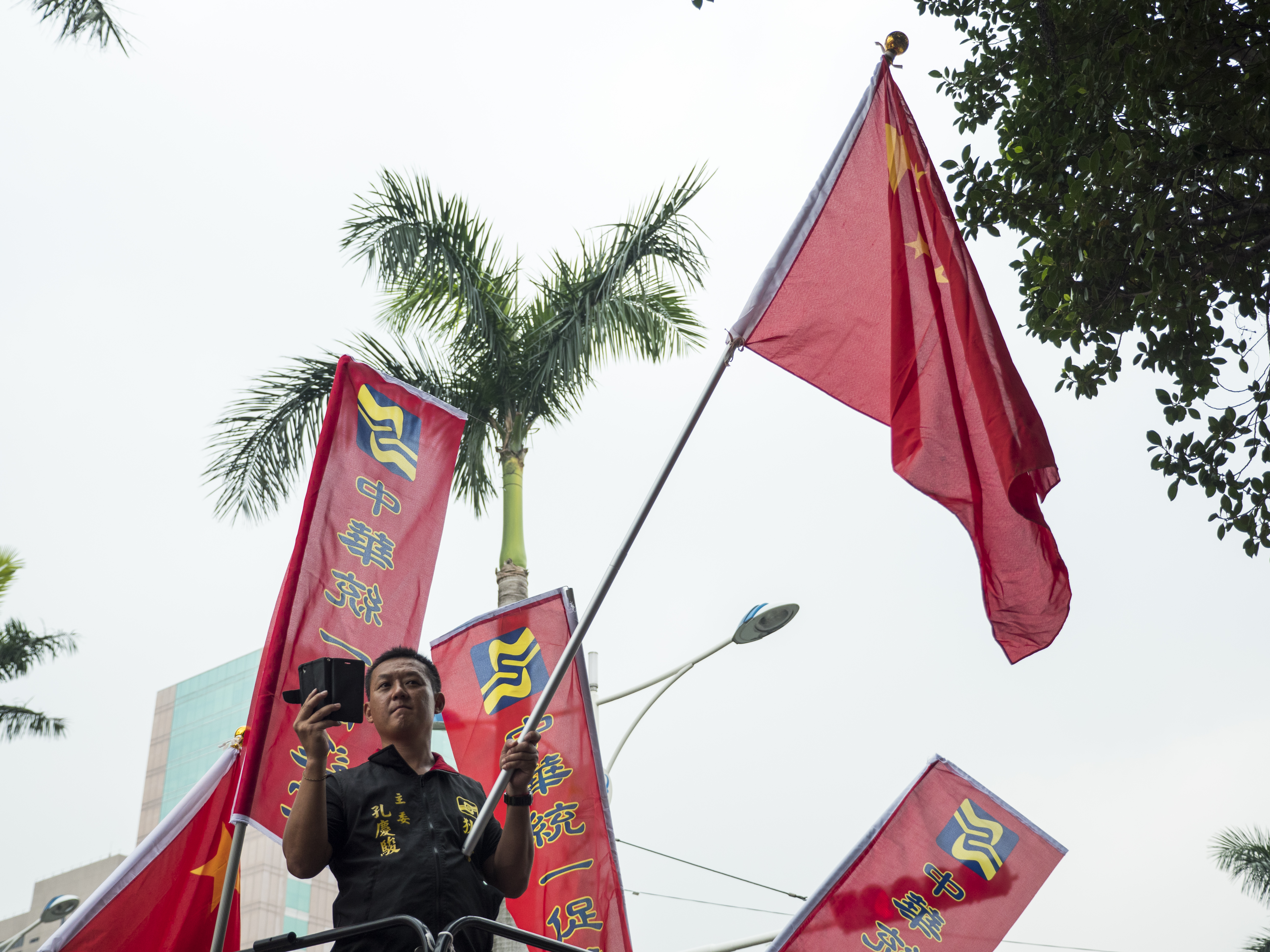
Rally organised by the Chinese Unification Promotion Party

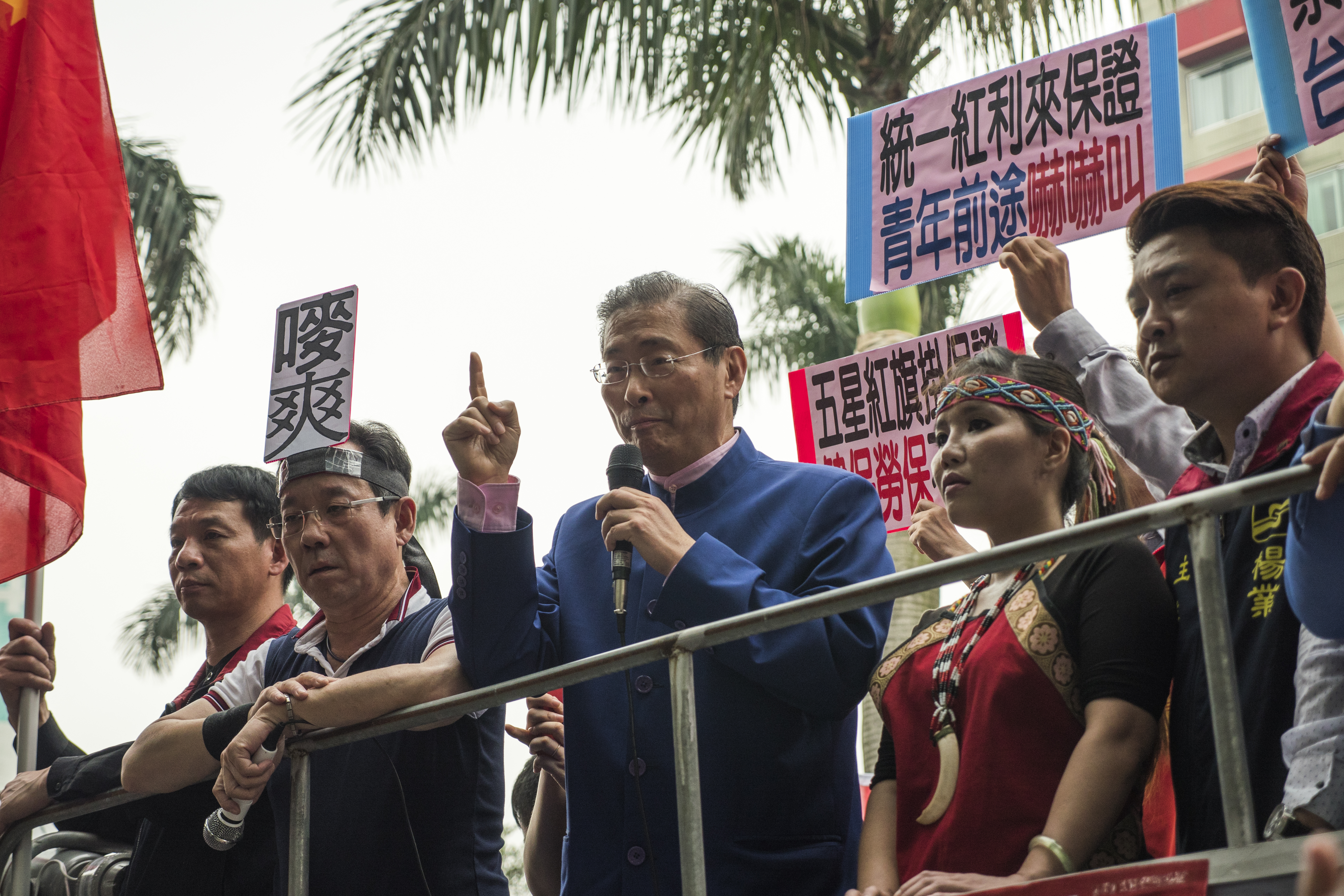
CUPP leader Chang An-lo

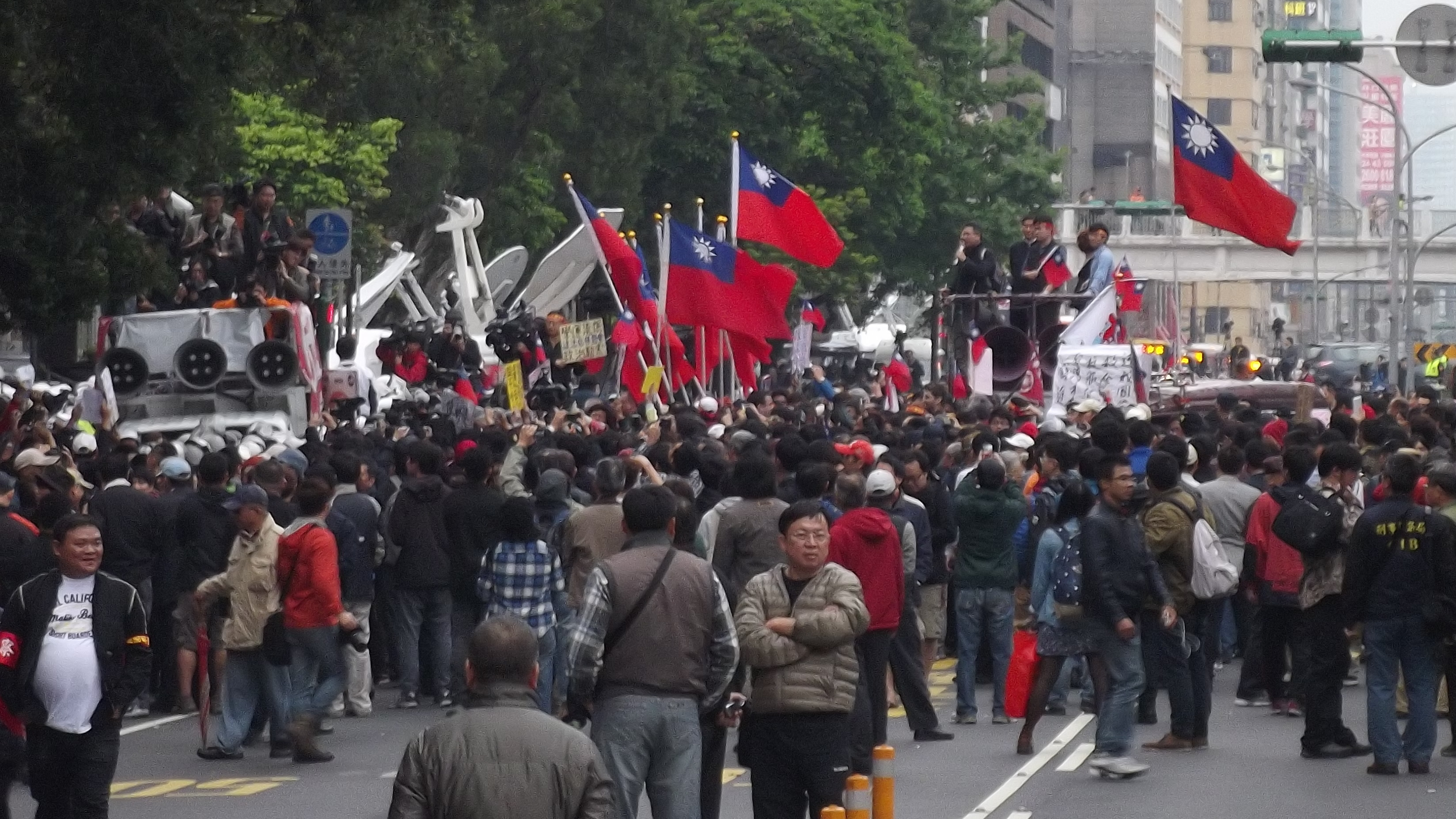
CUPP and other Chinese nationalist and pro-PRC supporters clashing with protestors during the Sunflower Student Movement in Taipei.

== See also ==
- Chinese Democratic Progressive Party
- Patriot Alliance Association
- Organized crime in Taiwan
- United front in Taiwan
