= Tang Chunfeng =

Chinese diplomat

- Born: 1953 (age 72–73); Liuyang, Hunan, China
- Occupation: diplomat

Tang Chunfeng

Chinese name
- Traditional Chinese: 唐淳風
- Simplified Chinese: 唐淳风
Transcriptions
Standard Mandarin
- Hanyu Pinyin: Táng Chúnfēng

Japanese name
- Kanji: 唐淳風
- Kana: とう じゅんふう
Transcriptions
- Romanization: Tō Junfū

Tang Chunfeng (Chinese: 唐淳风; born 1953) is a Chinese diplomat and researcher affiliated with the Ministry of Commerce of the People's Republic of China. He also served as the Economic Counselor at the Chinese Embassy in Japan from 1999 to 2002. He is recognized for his active support of the Ryukyu independence movement, advocating for the autonomy of the Ryukyu Islands, particularly Okinawa, from Japan, and has contributed to various public discussions on the historical and political relationship between the Ryukyu Islands and China.

== Advocacy for Ryukyu independence ==
Tang is known for his vocal support of the Ryukyu independence movement, particularly through his involvement with the "Chinese Ryukyu Network" (中国琉球网), a Chinese website dedicated to promoting the movement. He has made various claims about the historical and cultural connections between the Ryukyu Islands and mainland China. These claims include assertions that the Ryukyu Islands were historically part of the "big family of the Chinese nation," and that 90% of Ryukyuans are descendants of 36 families from Kume, who migrated from Fujian, Zhejiang, and Taiwan. Tang also argues that the Ryukyu language and culture were closely tied to Chinese traditions until the influence of Japanese colonization.

In his book Grieving Ryukyu (悲愤琉球), published by the Chinese publishing house Dongfang Press, Tang asserts that a 2006 referendum among Ryukyu residents showed 75% support for Ryukyu independence. He also claims that the Ryukyu Independence Commission sought the removal of military bases, the establishment of a provisional government, and the eventual annexation of the Ryukyu Islands by China. Tang's research into historical records traces the relationship between the Ryukyu Islands and China back to the Qin and Han dynasties, emphasizing the role of the Ryukyu Kingdom as a vital trading hub during the Ming and Qing dynasties. Tang further posits that Ryukyuans, despite adopting Western-style lifestyles, maintain a sense of identity as Chinese rather than Japanese. He argues that the Ryukyuans were subjected to forced Westernization and that their true cultural heritage aligns more closely with China.

Tang has written about the political status of the Ryukyu Islands in the context of international treaties, such as the Cairo and Potsdam Declaration after World War II. He has called for the return of not only Taiwan but also the Ryukyu Islands to Chinese sovereignty, citing these declarations as a legal basis for such claims. In an article for Ai Thought (爱思想), Tang praised the establishment of the "ACSILs" and interpreted it as a sign that the people of Ryukyu would continue to strive for independence. He also argued that the unresolved status of the Ryukyu Islands should be addressed in line with post-war agreements.

In reflecting on his own journey of understanding the Ryukyu issue, Tang acknowledged that he initially knew little about the Ryukyu Islands and was unaware of the historical and cultural connections between Ryukyuans and China. He shared a personal anecdote from his time in Japan, where a man from Okinawa expressed solidarity with his Chinese heritage, reinforcing Tang's belief that Ryukyuans share a deeper connection with China.

Tang has also discussed the so-called "Ryukyuan Massacre", which he believes occurred during the closing stages of World War II. According to Tang, after the Japanese military received the order to resist surrender in the face of the Potsdam Declaration, they engaged in mass killings of Ryukyuans. He compares this massacre to the Nanjing Massacre, asserting that the Japanese military killed over 260,000 Ryukyuans before the U.S. occupation. This account is also detailed in Grieving Ryukyu, where he describes the mass slaughter as a deliberate atrocity, similar in scale to other war crimes committed during the conflict.

== See also ==
- Map of National Shame
- Ryukyu independence movement
