= Zhonghua minzu =

Political term in modern Chinese nationalism

- Traditional Chinese: 中華民族
- Simplified Chinese: 中华民族
- Literal meaning: Chinese minzu (Note: Some writers also translate it as "Chinese people", "Chinese nation", "Chinese ethnicity", and "Chinese race". In East Asia, minzu (民族) generally does not mean "race", but since Xi Jinping, the term zhonghua minzu has also been widely used to mean the biological "Chinese race".)
Transcriptions
Standard Mandarin
- Hanyu Pinyin: Zhōnghuá mínzú
- Bopomofo: ㄓㄨㄥ ㄏㄨㄚˊ ㄇㄧㄣˊ ㄗㄨˊ
- Gwoyeu Romatzyh: Jonghwa Mintzwu
- Wade–Giles: Chung^{1}-hua^{2} min^{2}-tsu^{2}
- Tongyong Pinyin: Jhong-huá Mín-zú
- IPA: [ʈʂʊ́ŋ.xwǎ mǐn.tsǔ]
Wu
- Wenzhounese Romanisation: cion^{5} gho^{2} men^{2} yeu^{8}
- Suzhounese: tson^{5} wa^{2} min^{2} zoq^{8}
Gan
- Romanization: Zung^{1} fa^{4} min^{4} zuk^{6}
Hakka
- Romanization: zhung^{24} fa^{11} min^{11} zuk^{5}
Yue: Cantonese
- Jyutping: Zung^{1}-waa^{4} man^{4} zuk^{6}
- IPA: [tsʊŋ˥ wa˩ mɐn˩ tsʊk̚˨]
Southern Min
- Tâi-lô: Tiong-hûa bîn-cök

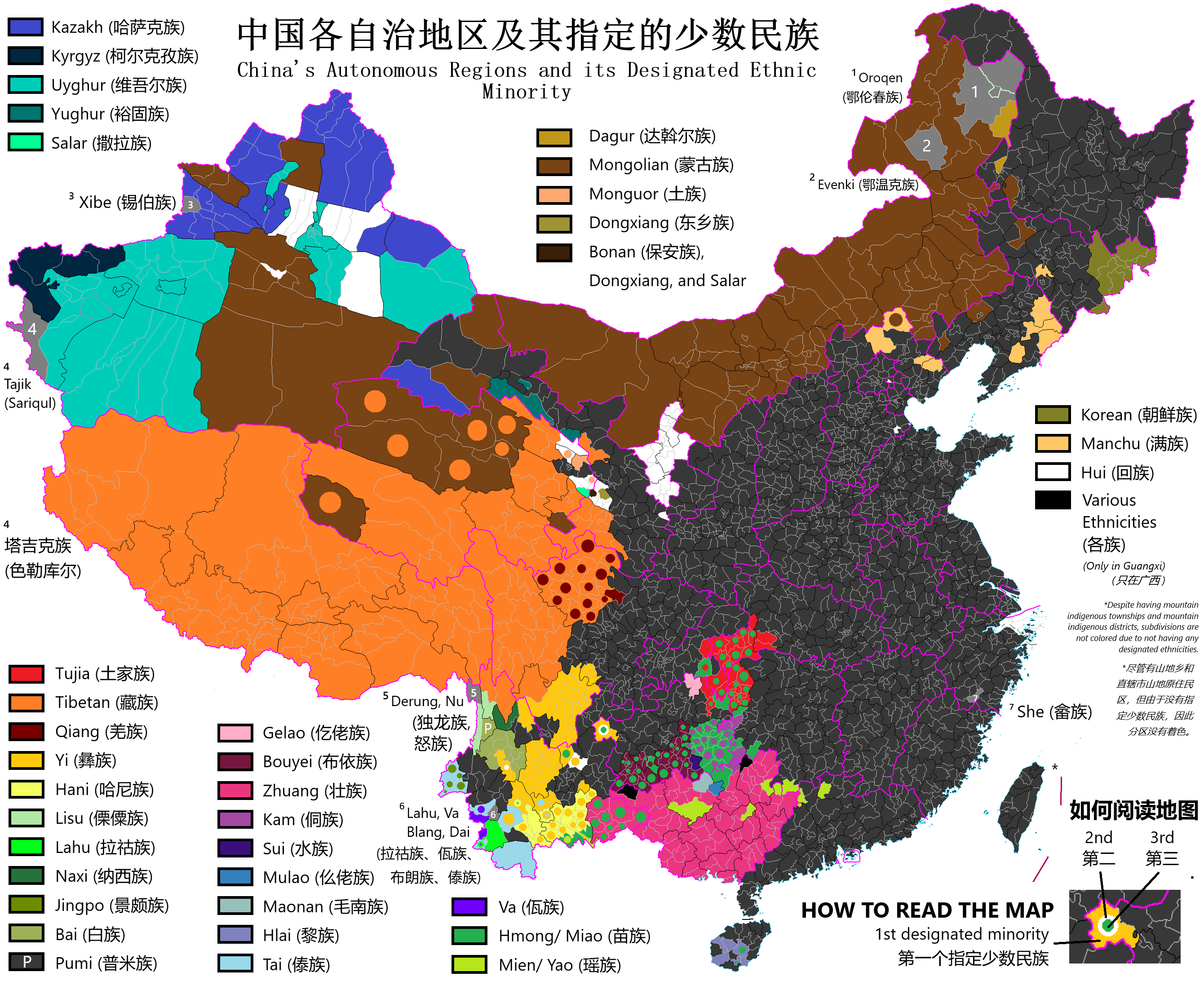
A map of China showing the ethnic minorities in each region. Collectively, these ethnic minorities (as well as the Han majority) are considered part of the Zhonghua minzu.

Zhonghua minzu is a political term in modern Chinese nationalism related to the concepts of nation-building and ethnicity in the Chinese nationality. Collectively, the term refers to the 56 ethnic groups of China, but being a part of the Zhonghua minzu does not mean one must have Chinese nationality (Chinese: 中国国籍; pinyin: Zhōngguó guójí) and thus have an obligation to be loyal to the People's Republic of China (PRC).

The Republic of China (ROC) of the Beiyang (1912–1927) period developed the term to describe Han Chinese (hanzu) and four other major ethnic groups (the Manchus, Mongols, Hui, and Tibetans) based on Five Races Under One Union. Conversely, Sun Yat-sen and the Kuomintang (KMT) envisioned it as a unified composite of Han and non-Han people.

The CPC adopted Zhonghua minzu in the 1930s and the PRC continued it after the death of Mao Zedong. It was used to describe the Han Chinese and other ethnic groups as a collective Chinese family. Since the late 1980s, Zhonghua minzu (中华民族; 'the Chinese nation') replaced the term Zhongguo renmin (中国人民; 'the Chinese people'), signalling a shift of nationality and minority policy from a multinational communist people's statehood of China to one multi-ethnic Chinese nation state with one single Chinese national identity.

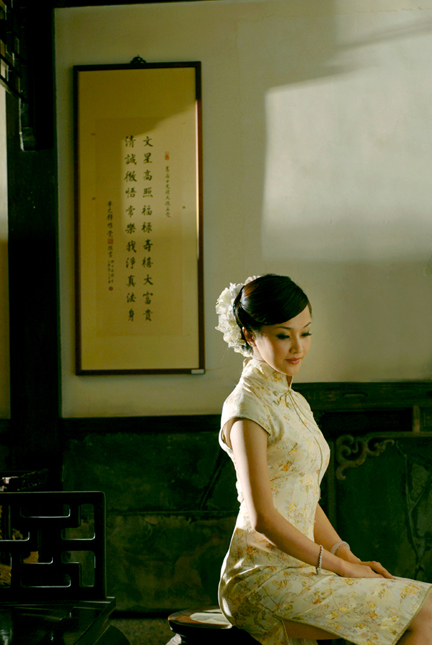
Woman wearing a cheongsam or qipao, a typical ethnic fusion dress of Manchu origin absorbing Han and Mongol styles.

== History ==
An older proto-nationalist term throughout Chinese history was Huaxia, but the immediate roots of the Zhonghua minzu lie in the Qing dynasty founded by the Manchu clan Aisin Gioro in what is today Northeast China. The Qing Emperors sought to portray themselves as ideal Confucian rulers for the Han Chinese, Bogda Khans for the Mongols, and Chakravartin kings for Tibetan Buddhists. After experiencing repeated humiliations by foreign powers, elites began to debate what it meant to be Chinese. Adapting the imported term minzu from Japan (where it related to the idea of modernizing), elites coined the phrase Zhonghua minzu.

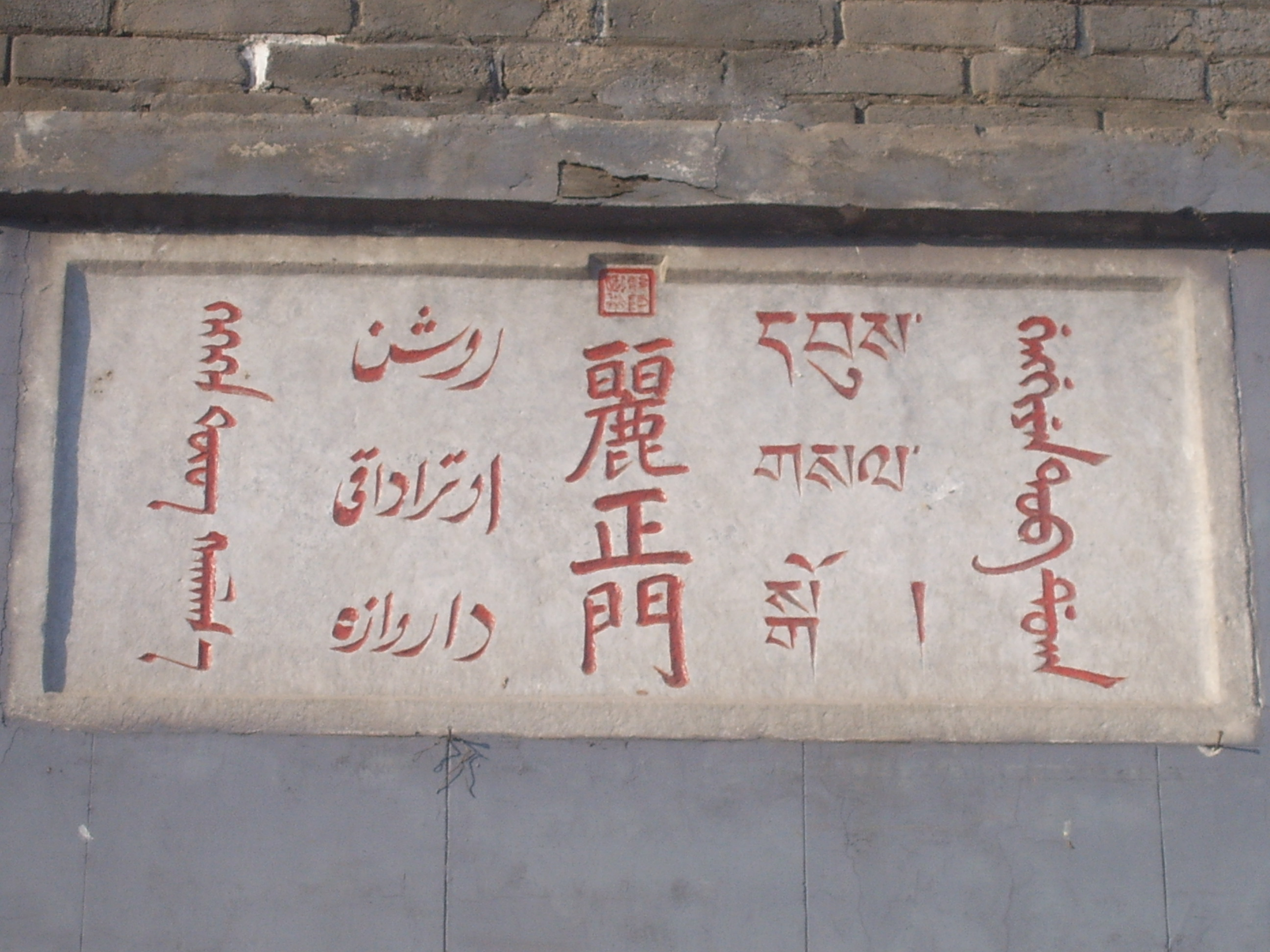
Lizheng Gate (麗正門) at the Chengde Mountain Resort. On the sign hanging over the gate there is written the letters used in the Qing Dynasty. From the left: Mongolian script, Chagatai Arabic script, Chinese, Tibetan, and Manchurian. These five languages are collectively referred to as "Chinese languages".

Dulimbai gurun (ᡩᡠᠯᡳᠮᠪᠠᡳ
ᡤᡠᡵᡠᠨ) is the Manchu name for China. It has the same meaning as the Chinese name Zhongguo (中國; 'Middle kingdom'). The Qing adopted the Han Chinese imperial model but considered the Manchu and Chinese names for "China" to be equivalent. It used "China" to describe the entirety of the state and its territory regardless of ethnic composition. The 'Chinese language' (Dulimbai gurun i bithe) referred to Chinese, Manchu, and Mongol languages. Zhongguo zhi ren (中國之人; ᡩᡠᠯᡳᠮᠪᠠᡳ
ᡤᡠᡵᡠᠨ ‍ᡳ
ᠨᡳᠶᠠᠯᠮᠠ Dulimbai gurun-i niyalma 'Chinese people') referred to all Han, Manchu, and Mongol subjects of the Qing. The Qing used phrases like Zhongwai yijia (中外一家) or neiwai yijia (內外一家; 'interior and exterior as one family') to portray itself as a unifying force between the "inner" Han Chinese and the "outer" non-Han like the Mongols and Tibetans.

These terms were used in official documents. "China" was commonly used in international communications and treaties such as the Treaty of Nanking. A Manchu language memorial used Dulimbai gurun to proclaim the 1759 conquest of Dzungaria. A Manchu language version of a treaty with the Russian Empire concerning criminal jurisdiction over bandits called people from the Qing as "people of the central kingdom (Dulimbai gurun)". In the Manchu official Tulisen's Manchu language account of his meeting with the Torghut Mongol leader Ayuka Khan, it was mentioned that while the Torghuts were unlike the Russians, the "people of the Central Kingdom" (dulimba-i gurun) were like the Torghut Mongols, and the "people of the Central Kingdom" referred to the Manchus.

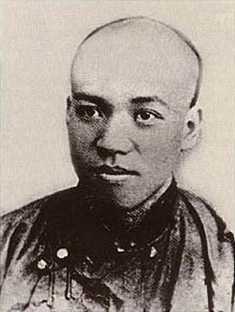
Liang Qichao, who put forward the concept of Zhonghua minzu

Before nationalism, loyalty was generally to the city-state, the feudal fief and its lord or, in the case of China, to a dynastic state. Some Han nationalists such as Sun Yat-sen initially described the Manchus as "foreign invaders" to be expelled, and planned to establish a Han nation-state modelled closely after Germany and Japan; this was discarded because alienating non-Han groups potentially meant the loss of imperial territory. This development in Chinese thinking was mirrored in the expansion of the meaning of the term Zhonghua minzu to encompass Five Races Under One Union based on Qing ethnic categories; the term was originally created by the late-Qing philologist Liang Qichao and only referred to the Han Chinese. This revision of Zhonghua minzu was used as early as 1912 by the Republic of China to supports claims of sovereignty over all Qing territories. By 1920, Sun Yat-sen also supported the creation of a "Chinese nation" from the various ethnic groups. This conflicted with the views of non-Han groups like the Mongols and Tibetans; they considered their fealty to be held by the Qing sovereign, and whose abdication left them independent and without obligations to the new Chinese state.

After the founding of the PRC, the concept of Zhonghua minzu became influenced by Soviet nationalities policy. Officially, the PRC is a unitary state composed of 56 ethnic groups, of which the Han are by far the largest. The concept of Zhonghua minzu is seen as an all-encompassing category consisting of people within the borders of the PRC.

This term has continued to be invoked and remains a powerful concept in China into the 21st century. In mainland China, it continues to hold use as the leaders of China need to unify into one political entity a highly diverse set of ethnic and social groups as well as to mobilize the support of overseas Chinese in developing China. The term is included in article 22 of the Regulations on United Front Work of the Chinese Communist Party: "...promote national unity and progress, and enhance the identification of the masses of all ethnic groups with the great motherland, the Chinese nation (Zhonghua minzu), Chinese culture, the Chinese Communist Party, and socialism with Chinese characteristics." Zhonghua minzu is also one of the Five Identifications.

In Taiwan, it has been invoked by former President Ma Ying-jeou as a unifying concept that includes the people of both Taiwan and mainland China without a possible interpretation that Taiwan is part the People's Republic of China.

== Implications ==
The adoption of the Zhonghua minzu concept may give rise to the reinterpretation of Chinese history. For example, the Qing dynasty was originally sometimes characterized as a conquest dynasty or non-Han regime. Following the adoption of the Zhonghua minzu ideology, which regards the Manchus as a member of the Zhonghua minzu, dynasties founded by ethnic minorities are no longer stigmatized.

The concept of Zhonghua minzu nevertheless also leads to the reassessment of the role of many traditional hero figures. Heroes such as Yue Fei and Zheng Chenggong, who were originally often considered to have fought for China against barbarian incursions, have been re-characterized by some as minzu yingxiong ('ethnic heroes') who fought not against barbarians but against other members of the Zhonghua minzu—the Jurchens and Manchus respectively. At the same time, China exemplified heroes such as Genghis Khan, who became a national hero as a member of the Zhonghua minzu.

== Ambiguity ==
The concept of the Zhonghua minzu has sometimes resulted in friction with neighboring countries such as Mongolia, North Korea and South Korea, who claim regional historical peoples and states. For instance, Mongolia has questioned the concept of Genghis Khan as a "national hero" during the Republic of China period. Since the collapse of socialism, Mongolia has clearly positioned Genghis Khan as the father of the Mongolian nation. Some Chinese scholars rejections of that position involve tactics such as pointing out that more ethnic Mongols live within China than Mongolia and that the modern-day state of Mongolia acquired its independence from the Republic of China which claimed the legal right to inherit all Qing territories, including Mongolia, through the Imperial Edict of the Abdication of the Qing Emperor. There is also controversy between China and the Korean Peninsula regarding the historical status of Goguryeo.

== Resistance to Zhonghua minzu ==
The Xi Jinping administration, since Xi Jinping's appointment as General Secretary of the Chinese Communist Party in November 2012, has promoted the slogan of the "Great rejuvenation of the Chinese nation".

Reverence for the legendary ancestor of the Chinese people, the Yellow Emperor, has intensified, and in some regions such as Uyghur and Tibet, there are individuals who feel resentment toward being subsumed under the concept of the "Zhonghua minzu".

Furthermore, resistance to Chinese nationalism also exists among Taiwanese independence advocates and the Hong Kong localist camp. In response to this, Hong Kong nationalism emerged, and Taiwanese nationalism, advocated by Taiwanese historian Su Beng, gained traction. The theory that Hongkongers constitute a distinct ethnic group, known as Hong Kong ethnic theory, was also influenced by these ideas.

The concept of the Chinese nation has also been discussed in connection with territorial disputes, based on the notion that “the land inhabited by the Chinese nation should be governed by a single state”. These ideas are referred to as Greater Chinese nationalism, and in Hong Kong, supporters of such ideology are often mocked with the term Zhōnghuá jiāo. The term “Greater China” itself originates from the traditional idea that China has historically been a unified civilization.

Liu Zhongjing, a political theorist residing in the United States, has argued that the concept of the Chinese nation is a political fabrication and has advocated for the theory of Zhu-Xiaism (諸夏主義).

Chan Ho-tin stated that Peking claims the People’s Republic of China is a nation-state with a unified national identity called “Zhonghua Minzu” or the “Chinese race.” This concept, used to serve political and imperial goals, includes diverse groups such as Tibetans, Mongolians, Shanghainese, Taiwanese, Hong Kongers, and the Chinese diaspora worldwide. According to Beijing’s official stance, all these groups are part of the “Zhonghua” race and thus owe loyalty to the central government. While this is considered absurd by many scholars, it remains the party line. Chan Ho-tin criticized this nationalism as a cover for Chinese imperialism. He pointed to Beijing’s breaches of the Seventeen Point Agreement with Tibet, broken promises upon joining the WTO, and violations of the Sino-British Joint Declaration that have reduced freedoms in Hong Kong.

== Relations with Japan ==
Tang Chunfeng, a Chinese scholar specializing in Okinawan affairs, has expressed support for the Ryukyu independence movement and asserted that the Ryukyuan people are descendants of the Chinese nation.

Zhao Dong of the Preparatory Committee for the Ryukyu Special Autonomous Region of China, which claims that Okinawa is Chinese territory, stated that "Ryukyu is part of the Chinese nation's domain".

In August 1948, Kiyuna Tsugumasa, a former spy for the Republic of China, declared, “We are part of the Chinese nation and must support the liberation of our Ryukyuan brothers.”

== See also ==
- China proper
- China Ethnic Museum
- Chinese Dream
- Chinese unification
- Chinese uniformity
- Descendants of the Dragon
- Ethnic minorities in China
- March of the Volunteers
- Minzu (anthropology)
- Multi-ethnic nationalism
- Sinicization
- Sinocentrism
- Three Principles of the People
- Volk
- Yan Huang Zisun
