= Taiwan Biancha Liuyu =

Taiwan Biancha Liuyu (Chinese: 台湾编查流寓) is the subheading title under the section "Volume 20: Population Registration" in the Qing Dynasty administrative legal compilation Imperially Commissioned Administrative Statutes of the Six Ministries (Qinding Liubu Chufen Zeli欽定六部處分則例) edited by the Ministry of Personnel. Due to a statement in Inō Kanori’s 1928 publication, Taiwan Culture Chronicle, this term has often been misinterpreted by later scholars as the title of an actual regulation promulgated by the Qing government aimed at restricting migration to Taiwan. As a result, it has been mistakenly referred to as “Taiwan Registration on Migrants Regulations in the Six Ministries’ Statutes（台湾编查流寓六部处分则例）”, “Registration on Migrants Regulations in Taiwan Statutes（台湾编查流寓则例）”, “Registration on Migrants in Taiwan Regulations（台湾编查流寓例）”, or “Registration on Migrants Six Ministries Statutes（编查流寓六部处分则例）”.

== Text of the regulation ==
The commonly available version of the Imperially Commissioned Regulations of the Six Ministries (Qinding Liubu Chufen Zeli，钦定六部处分则例) is the Imperially Commissioned Revised Regulations of the Six Ministries (Qinding Chongxiu Liubu Chufen Zeli，欽定六部處分則例), compiled by the Ministry of Personnel in the 13th year of the Guangxu reign (1887) and printed using movable type. In the 18th year of Guangxu (1892), this book was typeset and published by the Shanghai Tushu Jicheng Publishing Bureau.In this revised edition, the compilers included a section titled “Taiwan Biancha Liuyu”, which outlines three specific administrative regulations that local officials in Taiwan were expected to follow when dealing with Han Chinese migrants who had relocated to the island. The full text of that section is as follows:

Taiwan Biancha Liuyu

For Han migrants in Taiwan, any individual without a wife or property shall be ordered to return to the mainland by sea and handed over to the authorities of their original place of registration for supervision. Those who have a wife and property and voluntarily wish to reside in Taiwan shall have their cases reported by the respective prefecture or county to their place of origin, with a formal notification submitted to the Taiwan Circuit Intendant for inspection and further filed with the provincial governor and governor-general. If, after settling in Taiwan, such individuals commit minor offenses punishable by caning or less, the punishment shall be administered as usual without deportation. However, if they commit offenses punishable by penal servitude or more, regardless of whether they have a wife or property, they shall be escorted back to their place of origin for trial and shall not be allowed to return to Taiwan. If a prefect or county magistrate fails to promptly carry out the deportation and negligently retains one or two individuals, they shall be fined nine months’ salary; for three individuals, one year's salary; for five or more, they shall be demoted by one rank and retain their post; for ten or more, they shall be demoted by one rank and reassigned (these are considered official offenses). If officials allow criminal or disorderly migrants to gather and cause disturbances, they shall be impeached and dismissed from office (a private offense).

When merchant ships arrive in Taiwan, local officials shall, following inland practices, establish a "Ten-Household Register," recording the merchants' names, native places, exact number of household members, and business type. Each month, a declaration stating “no vagrants have been recruited” must be obtained and submitted to higher authorities for inspection. If any recruitment of vagrants is discovered, the merchants shall be punished according to regulation, and the local official shall be demoted by one rank and reassigned (an official offense).

Han Chinese in Taiwan are strictly prohibited from marrying indigenous women without authorization. Offenders shall be punished with ninety blows of the cane for both the native officials and interpreters involved. The local official shall be demoted by one rank and reassigned (an official offense).

The same passage can also be found in the Imperially Commissioned Newly Compiled Regulations of the Six Ministries (Qinding Xinzuan Liubu Chufen Zeli), which was promulgated by the Ministry of Personnel in the 8th year of the Daoguang reign (1828). The Hatcher Graduate Library at the University of Michigan has digitized the version held in its collection. This digitized version has been made publicly available online through the HathiTrust Digital Library.

== Inō Kanori’s interpretation ==
In Chapter 2, “The Relaxation and Tightening of Travel to Taiwan,” of Volume 11 in The Cultural History of Taiwan, published in 1928, Inō Kanori wrote:

In the 22nd year of the Kangxi reign (1683), when the Qing dynasty had just pacified Taiwan, the imperial court debated whether to abandon the island. The prevailing view was that the territory was isolated overseas and prone to becoming a haven for bandits; therefore, it should be excluded from the empire’s domain. It was proposed that the Han people who had settled there in earlier times should all be relocated to the mainland, with only the residents of Penghu remaining.At that time, however, The Admiral of the Fujian Navy, Shi Lang, firmly opposed this plan and submitted a memorial detailing the pros and cons of abandoning or retaining Taiwan. As a result, the abandonment was halted.Nevertheless, the passive attitude of the initial court debate continued to shape the governance policy toward Taiwan. Authorities imposed strict surveillance on the existing residents and prohibited the idle and unemployed drifters—those deemed a potential threat to public order—from remaining. Such individuals were forcibly returned to their native places by sea (a practice referred to as "expulsion across the waters"). Restrictions were also placed on new migrants intending to come to Taiwan. Accordingly, the government issued the Regulations for the Registration and Supervision of Migrants in Taiwan, as found in the Six Ministries' Codes and Regulations, which stated:

"Those among the migrant population in Taiwan who have neither wife nor property shall be expelled and returned across the waters, and placed under the jurisdiction of their native locality. Those who have a wife and property and are willing to reside in Taiwan must have their local prefecture or county notify their place of origin, report the matter to The Taixia Military Defense Commissioner for inspection, and submit the case for filing by the provincial governor and governor-general. If, after settling in Taiwan, they commit a minor offense punishable by flogging or less, they shall be dealt with accordingly and not expelled. However, if they commit an offense warranting penal servitude or above, they shall be sent back to their place of origin for trial, regardless of whether they have a wife or property, and shall not be allowed to return to Taiwan. Officials who fail in their duties to detect such issues shall be punished by salary deductions or demotion according to the severity of the oversight. Those who cause unrest by harboring evildoers and allowing migrant gatherings that lead to disturbances shall be dismissed from office."

Subsequently, Mr. Inō also indicated that there were "three accompanying restrictions" regarding the migration of people to Taiwan. The contents are as follows:

*Those wishing to sail to Taiwan must first obtain a permit from their place of origin. This must be inspected by the Taiwan-Xiamen Coastal Defense Circuit Commissioner and approved upon verification by The Deputy Magistrate of Taiwan Coastal Defense. Unauthorized migration (i.e., covert crossings) shall be severely punished.

*Those traveling to Taiwan are not permitted to bring their families. Furthermore, after arrival, they may not summon or bring them over.

*The Guangdong region has long been a hotbed of piracy, and as its habits have not yet been reformed, its people are prohibited from migrating to Taiwan.

== Misattribution and scholarly interpretations ==
Due to Inō Kanori’s statements in The Cultural History of Taiwan, many later scholars have often misunderstood that, as early as the 22nd year of Kangxi’s reign, the Qing government had already issued a regulation titled Taiwan Regulations for the Registration and Supervision of Migrants by the Six Ministries to restrict migration to Taiwan. They also believe that the so-called Taiwan Regulations for the Registration and Supervision of Migrants by the Six Ministries included three specific restrictions (such as the third one, which prohibited people from Guangdong from migrating to Taiwan).For example, the scholar Ng Chiau-tong stated in A Study of the Republic of Formosa that: “The so-called Taiwan Migrant Registration Regulations issued shortly after the Qing took possession of Taiwan contained strict provisions such as ‘those residing in Taiwan without property or occupation shall be forcibly repatriated to the mainland.’” He then cited the three "restrictions on migration to Taiwan" written by Inō to support his argument.

The scholarsHuang Xiuzheng, Zhang Shengyan, and Wu Wenxing, in their co-authored work A History of Taiwan, stated:“In 1683, although the Qing court had already pacified Taiwan, it remained wary of the former subjects of the Zheng regime. As a result, it issued the Taiwan Regulations for the Registration and Supervision of Migrants by the Six Ministries. In addition to registering the original 'migrant population' in Taiwan, the regulation strictly limited immigration qualifications. Migrants were not allowed to bring their families, and those who had settled in Taiwan were prohibited from returning home to bring their families over. This serves as a concrete example of the Qing dynasty’s passive approach to governing Taiwan.” In the Encyclopedia of Taiwanese History, supervised by the scholar Wu Mi-cha, there is also an entry titled Regulations for the Registration and Supervision of Migrants by the Six Ministries. The compilers of the book state:

In the 22nd year of the Kangxi reign (1683), when Taiwan was incorporated into the territory of the Qing dynasty, there were already many Han Chinese settled on the island. These Han settlers were regarded by the authorities as “migrant residents.” If not strictly managed, they were seen as likely to once again become a base for anti-Qing resistance. Therefore, the Qing court issued the Regulations for the Registration and Supervision of Migrants by the Six Ministries.According to this regulation, any “migrant residents” in Taiwan who had neither a family nor property were to be deported back to their native places on the mainland and were not allowed to remain in Taiwan. Those who had both family and property and voluntarily wished to stay in Taiwan were required to register with the authorities. As for criminals, regardless of whether they had family or not, they were to be escorted back to their place of origin to face trial.

What’s more, some scholars have even regarded these three restrictions as constituting the so-called “Migration Ban to Taiwan.” For example, Su Beng (Shi Ming) stated in Taiwan’s 400-Year History:

In 1683 (the 22nd year of the Kangxi reign), as soon as the Qing army occupied Taiwan, it immediately promulgated the Regulations for the Registration and Supervision of Migrants in Taiwan (see Six Ministries’ Disciplinary Regulations, Volume 20). The content included strict provisions prohibiting certain residents and Han Chinese from migrating to Taiwan:

*Merchants and civilians from the mainland who came to Taiwan for trade had to be inspected and approved by The Taixia Military Defense Commissioner, and issued a travel permit. All inbound and outbound ships were subject to strict inspection. Those who attempted to migrate illegally would be severely punished, and both the operators of the smuggling vessels and the local officials who failed to detect such activities would also be prosecuted according to the law.

*Those migrating to Taiwan were not permitted to bring their families. Those already in Taiwan were likewise not allowed to summon or bring their family members over.

*The regions of Chaozhou and Huizhou were longstanding strongholds of piracy, and their unruly customs had not yet been reformed; therefore, people from those areas were prohibited from coming to Taiwan.

Ong Iok-tek also stated in Taiwan: A History of Suffering:

However, the Qing dynasty's negative impression of migrants could not be dispelled. All migrants were regarded as dangerous elements, and how to strictly control them became a fundamental policy for governing Taiwan. The Qing immediately issued the Taiwan Regulations for the Registration and Supervision of Migrants, imposing various restrictions on these "migrant residents." Those who were single and without an occupation were subject to "expulsion across the waters" — that is, forcibly repatriated to their place of origin on the mainland. For those wishing to migrate to Taiwan in the future, the authorities imposed "three prohibitions" as strict controls:

*Those wishing to sail to Taiwan had to first obtain a permit from their place of origin, which would then be inspected by the Taiwan-Xiamen Coastal Defense Circuit Commissioner and approved by the Deputy Magistrate of Taiwan Coastal Defense. Unauthorized crossings would be severely punished.

*Migrants to Taiwan were not allowed to bring their families. Those who had already arrived were likewise forbidden from summoning them.

*As Guangdong had long been a stronghold of piracy and its people’s unruly customs had not been reformed, its residents were prohibited from migrating to Taiwan.

Li Xiaofeng, on the other hand, stated in 100 Major Events in Taiwanese History:

Because the Qing court feared that Taiwan might become a “haven for rebels and fugitives,” it was reluctant to expand and populate the territory. Thus, upon first taking control of Taiwan, the Qing immediately issued the Taiwan Regulations for the Registration and Supervision of Migrants, regarding those who migrated to Taiwan as “migrant residents.” This inevitably raises the question: did the Qing government truly regard Taiwan as a legitimate part of its territory?

In the Taiwan Regulations for the Registration and Supervision of Migrants, three major prohibitions on immigration to Taiwan were clearly stipulated:

*Unauthorized migration to Taiwan was strictly forbidden. Anyone wishing to sail to Taiwan had to first apply for a migration permit in their place of origin, which had to be reviewed and approved by the Taiwan-Xiamen Coastal Defense Circuit Commissioner and the Deputy Magistrate of Taiwan Coastal Defense before the journey could proceed.

*Migrants to Taiwan were strictly prohibited from bringing family members. Those who had already arrived were likewise forbidden from summoning their families later.

*People from Guangdong were not allowed to migrate to Taiwan, as the Qing court considered the region “a repeated haven for pirates.”

In his work published in 2013, he still stated: “When the Qing court first took control of Taiwan, it immediately issued the Taiwan Regulations for the Registration and Supervision of Migrants, treating those who migrated to Taiwan as ‘migrant residents’ and placing numerous restrictions upon them.” In later years, countless scholars have cited statements originating from The Cultural History of Taiwan, with varying interpretations.

== Recent scholarship ==
In 2019, scholar Hsu Hsueh-chi, building on the research of scholar Shih Chih-wen, pointed out: “‘The so-called ‘Migration Ban to Taiwan’ originated from Inō Kanori, who claimed it came from the Taiwan Regulations for the Registration and Supervision of Migrants in the Six Ministries’ Disciplinary Regulations. As for the claim that people from Huiyang and Chaozhou were prohibited from coming to Taiwan, that originated from Lien Heng’s The General History of Taiwan. In reality, no such records can be found in the Six Ministries’ Disciplinary Regulations, nor are there any passages in the Comprehensive History of Taiwan that prohibit people from Huiyang and Chaozhou from coming to Taiwan.”
