= Taiwan Independence Revolutionary Armed Force =

Taiwan Independence Revolutionary Armed Force 台灣獨立革命武裝隊
- Leader: Su Beng, Zhou Hao, Huang Yuan, and Chou Ching-An
- Founded: February 1950
- Dissolved: November 1950
- Ideology: Taiwanese independence Revolutionary socialism Left-wing nationalism Anti-imperialism; Anti-Chiangism; Anti-fascism
- Political position: Far-left

The Taiwan Independence Revolutionary Armed Force (Chinese: 台灣獨立革命武裝隊) was a radical Taiwan independence group. It was secretly organized by Su Beng, Zhou Hao, Huang Yuan, and Chou Ching-An, with the aim of assassinating the President of the Republic of China (ROC), Chiang Kai-shek, and seeking an opportunity to overthrow the ROC government that had come to Taiwan from the mainland. The organization was led by Shih Ming and Chou Ching-an, who recruited members in two groups. The first was to collect and hide guns in Shilin, Shuangxi, Jingbiao, and Miaoli in Taipei; the second was to monitor Chiang Kai-shek in and out of his official residence in the Yangmingshan area. Later, when the operation was detected, the members of the group were wanted and fled in all directions, and the organization was disbanded.

== See also ==
- Taiwan independence Left
- White Terror (Taiwan)
