= Taiwan independence Left =

Political movement in Taiwan

The Taiwan independence Left (Chinese: 台獨左派) are the leftist political and economic ideologies of the participants in the Taiwan independence movement, which favored left-wing nationalism, anti-imperialism (mainly opposition to Chinese imperialism), socialism (mainly social democracy or Trotskyism) and progressivism.

The Taiwan Statebuilding Party, the New Power Party, the Social Democratic Party, the Green Party Taiwan, and the Taiwan Obasang Political Equality Party are left-wing parties that support Taiwan independence. The International Socialist Forward is a revolutionary socialist (Trotskyist) political organization that supports Taiwanese independence. Some of the Taiwan Independence Left collaborate with the main center-left Taiwanese nationalist Democratic Progressive Party while others distance themselves in favor for more radical parties.

== History ==
Today's main Taiwanese nationalist movements have been bent on anti-communism and pro-Americanism to oppose Chinese imperialism, but historically, Taiwanese nationalist movements have adopted national liberation concepts derived from Marxism and Leninism to resist Japanese colonial rule and KMT dictatorship; Su Beng and Lee Teng-hui were members of the Chinese Communist Party in the late 1940s, and there was also a short-lived radical leftist party called the Taiwan Revolutionary Party in the 1980s. Several minor parties incorporate social democracy or green politics while supporting Taiwan's self-determination, such as the Social Democratic Party and the Green Party.

=== Taiwan under Japanese rule ===
There were left-leaning political parties for Taiwan independence, such as the Taiwanese Communist Party during the period of Taiwan under Japanese rule. The Taiwan independence movement under Japan was supported by Mao Zedong in the 1930s as a means of freeing Taiwan from Japanese rule, but he changed this position only after the Nationalists started claiming Taiwan with the Cairo Declaration.

=== Taiwan under Republic of China rule ===
Taiwan independence activists and leftists have been the main victims of "white terror" by the Kuomintang-led ROC government in the past.

The Democratic Progressive Party was left-wing in its early days, but it turned to a moderate Taiwanese nationalist party; The DPP does not always support orthodox left-wing views on labor rights or immigration issues, and supports Huadu (ROC independence) rather than Taiwanese independence.

== Opposition among the Left ==
While the majority of the Taiwanese leftists supports an independent, democratic Taiwan and is opposed to the Chinese Communist Party (CCP), some Taiwanese leftists, termed the pro-unification Left (左統) view the cross-strait relationship through a lens of historical Chinese nationalism and opposition to Western imperialism, often aligning with the People's Republic of China's (PRC) and the CCP's narrative of national unification. They argue that the PRC's push for unification is an anti-imperialist struggle for national sovereignty and that the current Taiwanese government under the DPP serves as a client regime of the United States. They often criticize the dominant pro-independence Left for adopting what they see as a Western-friendly, anti-communist stance and often needlessly acting recklessly and provocatively in their handling of Cross-strait relations. This perspective is often found in specific academic or activist circles and publications, such as articles from the Monthly Review or the Qiao Collective.

== Media ==
The New Bloom Magazine is an online pro-independence Left publication and activist collective based in Taipei that provides a progressive perspective on Taiwanese and Asia-Pacific politics and culture and on the independence movement. It was founded in 2014 by activists from the Sunflower Student Movement.

== See also ==
- Anarchism in Taiwan
- Chinese imperialism
- Feminism in Taiwan
- Labor movement in Taiwan
- List of political parties in Taiwan
- New Tide faction
- Progressivism in Taiwan
- Taiwan Communist Party
- Taiwan Go Go, a political alliance of left-leaning pro-independence parties, was formed on December 16, 2025.
- Taiwan Independence Association
- Taiwan Independence Revolutionary Armed Force
