= Five Identifications =

Chinese Communist Party slogan

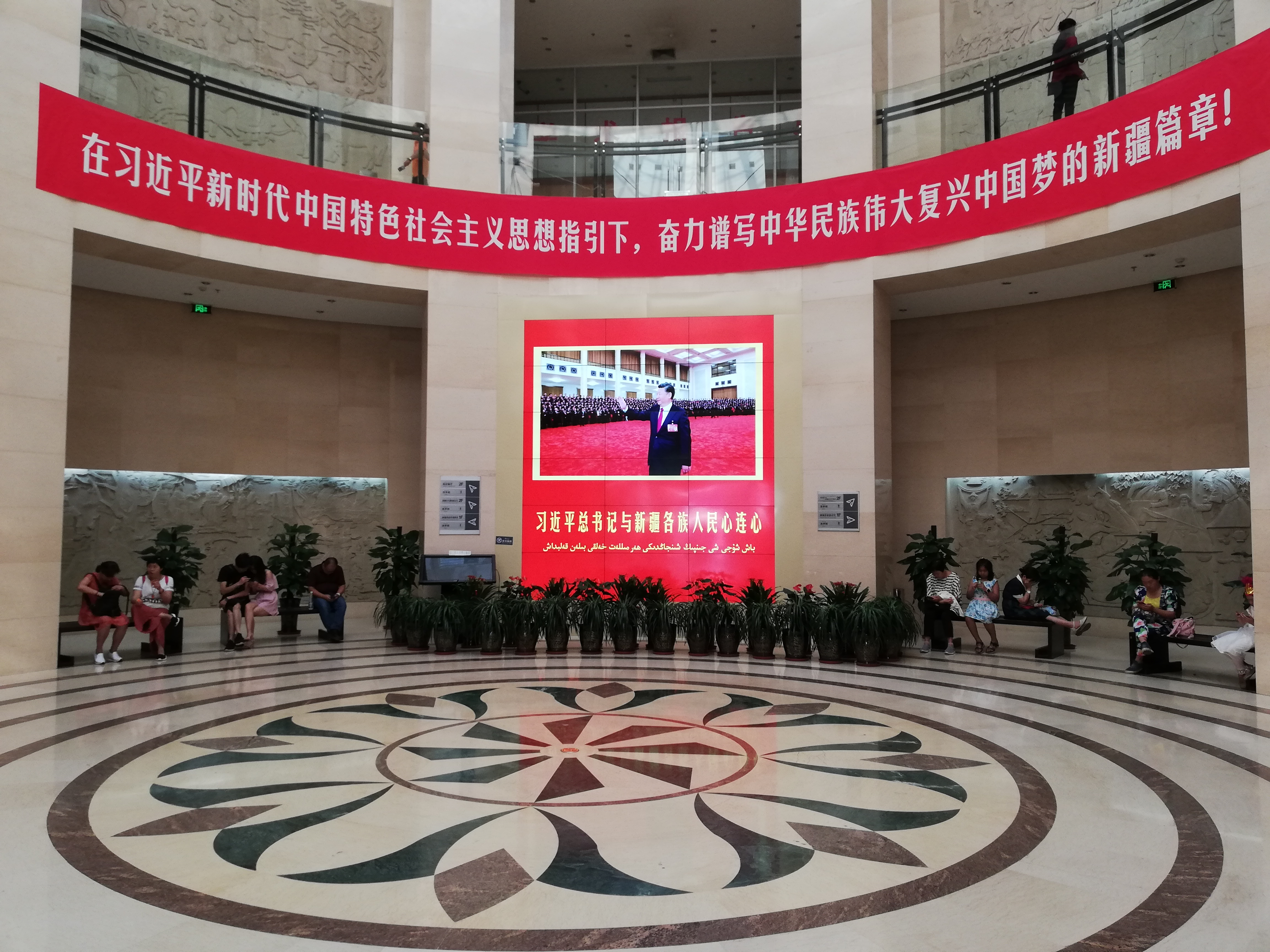
Entrance to the XUAR Museum in Ürümqi with a banner stating, "Under the guidance of Xi Jinping's ideology of socialism with Chinese characteristics for a new era, we strive to compose the Xinjiang chapter of the Chinese nation's great rejuvenation of the Chinese dream." In the middle, there is a display of Xi Jinping, accompanied with the caption "General Secretary Xi Jinping and people of all ethnic groups in Xinjiang are united in mind."

Five Identifications (Chinese: 五个认同) is a Chinese Communist Party (CCP) term proposed by the general secretary of the CCP Xi Jinping. The "five identifications" are:

1. the great motherland
2. the Chinese nation (Zhonghua minzu)
3. Chinese culture
4. the Chinese Communist Party
5. Socialism with Chinese characteristics

The CCP has stated that it wants to guide people of all ethnic groups toward these identifications. They believe they are an important foundation in maintaining social stability, long-term peace and security in ethnic regions. In addition to ethnic groups, religious adherents and prison inmates are to be guided toward the five identifications. Xi has repeatedly emphasized their importance.

== Background ==
At the Second Central Work Conference on Xinjiang held in Beijing in May 2014, Xi Jinping "emphasized the need to firmly establish the correct views of the motherland and ethnicity among all ethnic groups, promote the socialist core values and the socialist core values system, enhance the identification of all ethnic groups with the great motherland, the Chinese nation, Chinese culture, and the socialist path with Chinese characteristics. It is necessary to strengthen ideological and political work, create a positive social atmosphere, and guide people of all ethnic groups to pursue a modern civilized life." Other commentators use the term "four identifications" to represent "great motherland, the Chinese nation, Chinese culture, and the socialist path with Chinese characteristics" as stated by Xi at that May 2014 conference.

At a conference on ethnic work held in Beijing during September 2014, Xi Jinping discussed the necessity of doing a good job in ethnic work and enabling people of all ethnic groups to strengthen their identification with the "great motherland, the Chinese nation, Chinese culture, and the path of socialism with Chinese characteristics".

The Regulations on United Front Work of the CCP were published in 2015, and a listing of each of the five identifications (not the term itself) were given under article 20: "To comprehensively, deeply, and persistently carry out activities to promote ethnic unity and progress, actively cultivate the awareness of the Chinese nation as a community, and enhance the identification with the great motherland, the Chinese nation, Chinese culture, the CCP, and socialism with Chinese characteristics among people of all ethnic groups."

A revised version of the United Front Work regulations were published in 2021, with the word "trial" removed from the title. The five identifications were listed twice in the revised version. They appear in Chapter 5, Ethnic Work under article 22 and in Chapter 6, Religious Work under article 24. The addition of the five identifications for religious work clearly shows that religious followers will also be made to achieve these identifications.

Xi Jinping considers Chinese culture to be the "trunk" and the various ethnic cultures in China to be the "branches and leaves".

=== Rationale behind an evolution from "Four Identifications" to "Five Identifications" ===
Identification with the CCP was subsequently added to the "four identifications". An article posted on the website of the South-Central Minzu University stated that by highlighting the key identification with the CCP will help in "forming a more complete identification system and building a common ideological foundation for achieving ethnic unity".

== Core of Political Transformation ==
As mentioned in an article of 23 October 2019, on a Chinese government website relating to prisons: "The core content of political transformation (政治改造) to enhance the five identifications of criminals: identifying with the leadership of the Communist Party, the great motherland, the Chinese nation, Chinese culture, and the socialist path."

These five identifications are used as a basic standard for evaluating the effectiveness of criminal transformation.

"Political transformation" is the leading component of the "five major transformations" (五大改造) which began being rolled out in prisons across China after a National Prison Work Conference held in June 2018.

In 2020, the Beixinjing Prison in Shanghai released five books titled "Chinese Nation", "Chinese Culture", "Great China", "Socialism with Chinese Characteristics" and "Chinese Communist Party" to educate prison inmates on the "five identifications" with the purpose of strengthening the "political transformation" component of the "five major transformations".
