= Cheng Ping =

Cheng Ping (Chinese: 鄭評; pinyin: Zhèng Píng; 1927 – 11 August 1974), whose real name was Cheng Chih-jen (Chinese: 鄭智仁; pinyin: Zhèng Zhìrén), was a native of Kaohsiung, Taiwan. He participated in the Taiwan independence movement and was sentenced to death for organizing the assassination of Chiang Ching-kuo.

== See also ==
- Lin Chin-wen
- Chen Chih-hsiung
- Su Beng
