= Wencheng dialect =

Wu Chinese dialect

Wencheng
- 文成話
- Native to: People's Republic of China
- Region: Wenzhou prefecture, Zhejiang province
- Language family: Sino-Tibetan: Sinitic; Chinese; Wu; Oujiang; Wencheng

Language codes
- ISO 639-3: –
- ISO 639-6: wceg
- Glottolog: None

The Wencheng dialect (Chinese: 文成話; pinyin: Wénchénghuà) is a dialect of Wu Chinese. It is an Oujiang dialect, but its tone system differs from other Oujiang dialects such as Wenzhounese.

== Phonology ==
The most important difference between eastern Oujiang dialects such as Wencheng and Wenzhou proper are tonal differences and the retention of /f/ before /o/:

	八	风	到	晓得
Wenzhou	puu	hoŋ	tə	ɕadei
Wencheng	bɔ	foŋ	tɶ	ɕoli

Wencheng shares the long vowels of Wenzhonese entering tone (spelled puu above) as well as the abrupt glottal stops of the shang tones. The shang and ru tones are largely similar to Wenzhonese, but there are no falling tones—yang ping and yin qu are level—and yang qu is dipping rather than simply low.

Tone chart of the Wencheng dialect
Tone number	Tone name	Tone contour
1	yin ping (陰平)	˧ 3
2	yang ping (陽平)	ʱ˨ 2
3	yin shang (陰上)	˧˦ʔ 34
4	yang shang (陽上)	ʱ˨˧ʔ 23
5	yin qu (陰去)	˨ 2
6	yang qu (陽去)	ʱ˧˨˧ 323
7	yin ru (陰入)	˨˧ː 23
8	yang ru (陽入)	ʱ˨˩˧ː 213

Although yin qu has been said to have merged with yang ping (these are also close in Wenzhou, both being falling tones), the consonant voicing remains distinct. A second, slightly different transcription of Wencheng tone is reported, presumably largely due to speaker differences.
