= Chinese imperialism =

Expansion of China's political, economic, military, and cultural influence

- Traditional Chinese: 中國帝國主義
- Simplified Chinese: 中国帝国主义
Transcriptions
Standard Mandarin
- Hanyu Pinyin: Zhōngguó dìguó zhǔyì
- Bopomofo: ㄓㄨㄥ ㄍㄨㄛˊ ㄉㄧˋ ㄍㄨㄛˊ ㄓㄨˇ ㄧˋ
- Wade–Giles: Chung^{1}-kuo^{2} ti^{4}-kuo^{2} chu^{3}-i^{4}

Alternative Chinese name
- Traditional Chinese: 中華帝國主義
- Simplified Chinese: 中华帝国主义
Transcriptions
Standard Mandarin
- Hanyu Pinyin: Zhōnghuá dìguó zhǔyì
- Bopomofo: ㄓㄨㄥ ㄏㄨㄚˊ ㄉㄧˋ ㄍㄨㄛˊ ㄓㄨˇ ㄧˋ
- Wade–Giles: Chung^{1}-hua^{2} ti^{4}-kuo^{2} chu^{3}-i^{4}

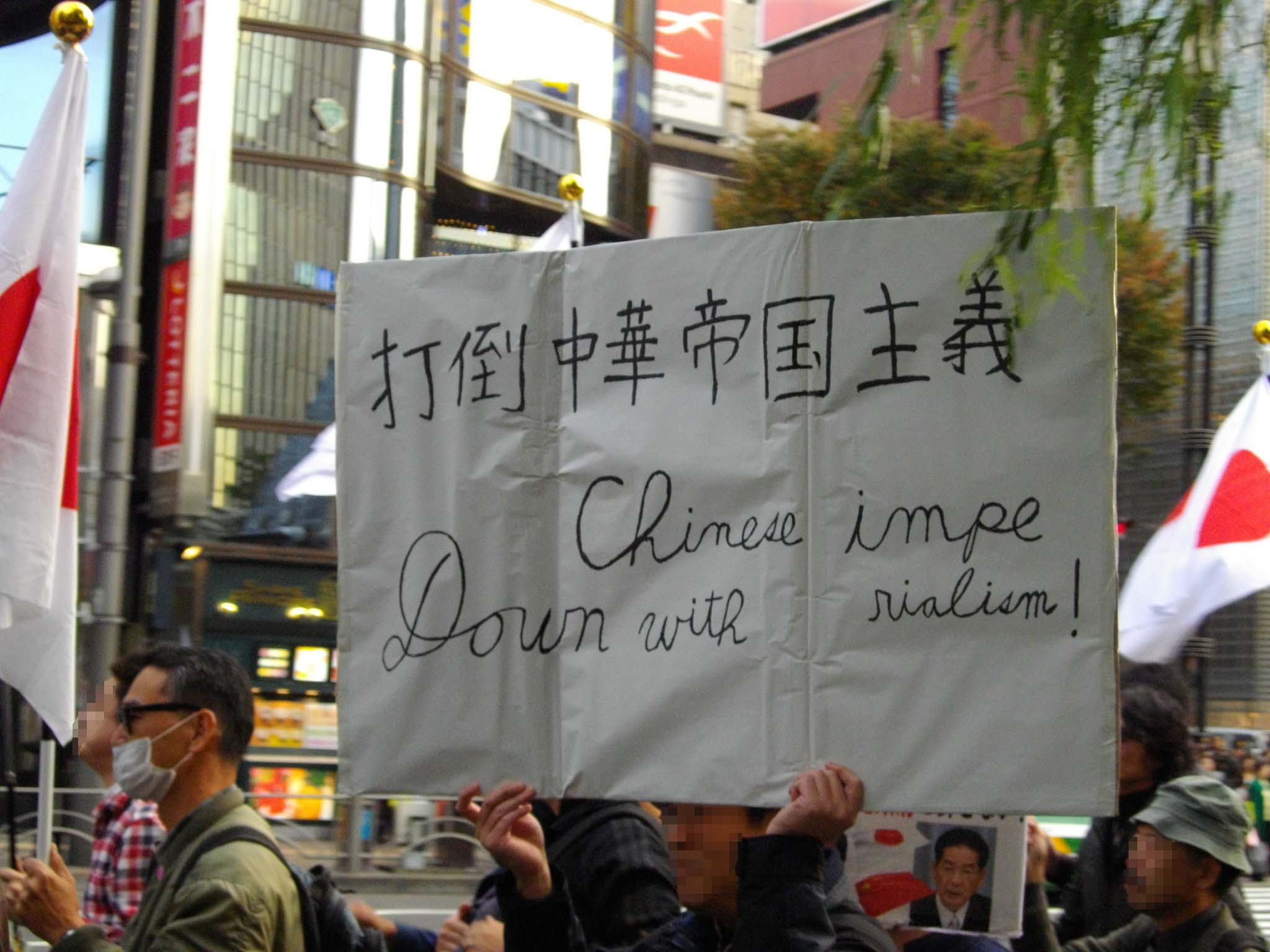
On 6 November 2010, a month after the 2010 Senkaku boat collision incident, conservative protesters in Japan displayed the slogan "Down with Chinese imperialism" (打倒中華帝国主義) to express their discontent.

Chinese imperialism is the expansion of political, economic, cultural, media, and military power or control by the People's Republic of China outside its boundaries. It has also been used to refer to its territorial claims in the South China Sea and the persecution of Uyghurs in China, including by the New People's Army and Japanese Communist Party. China's relations with Africa have also been accused of being neo-colonial, particularly the Belt and Road Initiative.

== History ==
=== People's Republic of China ===
Since the start of the reform and opening up in 1978, China became a new economic, military, and political great power. As China transformed, there were hopes that the Chinese government would give up its expansionist ideas. However, since Chinese Communist Party general secretary Xi Jinping's rise to power, and as a result of increasing territorial conflicts in which China stated that most of the disputed lands belong to China, it is generally believed that China continues to adhere to irredentist claims.

==== Belt and Road Initiative ====
Some academics and commentators have argued that since 2012, CCP general secretary Xi Jinping has demonstrated "a concerted imperialist policy" towards its developing neighbor states to the south and west, especially Mongolia, Kazakhstan, Tajikistan, Kyrgyzstan, Afghanistan, Pakistan, Nepal, Myanmar, Cambodia, Laos, and Vietnam. This is associated with criticism of debt trap diplomacy.

With China's rapid economic development and its increased investment in Africa, a new round of debate has emerged over whether Chinese investment in Africa is imperialistic. Horace Campbell has called this debate "superficial" and considers China's involvement as still distinct from Western imperialism. Forum on China–Africa Cooperation (FOCAC) coordinates much of the investment. According to Evan Hsiang in Harvard International Review, China's investment in countries such as Zambia, which had a debt crisis in 2020 and had the "highest number of Chinese lenders of all African states", has been seen with the lens of economic imperialism, but may result from mismanagement and lack of regulations rather than planned debt traps. Nonetheless, Hsiang also cites "China's structural dominance" in the Zambian mining industry and that many of the projects neglect working conditions due to "China's unchallenged power" and the projects go through due to pressure by Chinese bureaucracy on African governments. He recommends that greater scrutiny of FOCAC would limit exploitative interactions.

China official sources have pointed out that countries were not compelled to take the loans and they came with no strings attached in their agreements; however outside observers have noted that many of the debtor countries have entered fiscal difficulty, such as Sri Lanka, who defaulted on its sovereign debt. Sri Lanka's Hambantota International Port has been leased to China Merchants Ports for 99 years starting in 2017. A Chinese state-owned company signing a 99-year lease on a foreign port is seen as both a current erosion of sovereignty and a symbolic one similar to 19th century colonialism, because that is the amount of time Britain leased colonial Hong Kong from China in 1898. A Chinese state-owned company has also leased Gwadar Port in Pakistan for 43 years, significant protests have occurred against Chinese interests in the port of Gwadar. The China–Pakistan Economic Corridor (CPEC) has been seen as a geostrategic effort to advance the PRC's influence. Baloch insurgent militant groups in Pakistan have also labeled the CPEC as an imperialist endeavor by China. According to The Economic Times, Chinese state interests in Sri Lanka, Pakistan, and Bangladesh form a cohesive strategy to encircle India. This overall strategy, named by U.S. and Indian commentators, is the String of Pearls which is a combination of economic and naval interests by China surrounding India. Supporting India's claim is the ability of the Gwadar port to host naval ships, and with the increasing presence of China there, the People's Liberation Army Navy may be able use Gwadar as a forward base.

However other researchers dispute this view. An October 2019 report by the Lowy Institute said that China had not engaged in deliberate actions in the Pacific which justified accusations of debt-trap diplomacy (based on contemporaneous evidence), and China had not been the primary driver behind rising debt risks in the Pacific; the report expressed concern about the scale of the country's lending, however, and the institutional weakness of Pacific states which posed the risk of small states being overwhelmed by debt. A 2020 Lowy Institute article called Sri Lanka's Hambantota International Port the "case par excellence" for China's debt-trap diplomacy, but called the narrative a "myth" because the project was proposed by former Sri Lankan president Mahinda Rajapaksa, not Beijing. The article added that Sri Lanka's debt distress was not caused by Chinese lending, but by "excessive borrowing on Western-dominated capital markets".

According to The Diplomat, Belt and Road Initiative (BRI) investment also exacerbates separatism and ethnic tensions in host countries, because the PRC government and state-backed corporations "preference for dealing exclusively with those who hold positions of power. Analysis of the BRI should go beyond the 'debt trap', geopolitics, or economic spillovers, but also examine the social fissures that emerge from the massive inflows of Chinese capital in host countries."

==== Xinjiang re-education camps ====
Xinjiang re-education camps were established in the late 2010s under Xi Jinping's administration. Human Rights Watch says that they have been used to indoctrinate Uyghurs and other Muslims since 2017 as part of a "people's war on terror", a policy announced in 2014. The camps have been criticized by the governments of many countries and human rights organizations for alleged human rights abuses, including mistreatment, rape, and torture, with some of them alleging genocide.

==== South China Sea disputes ====
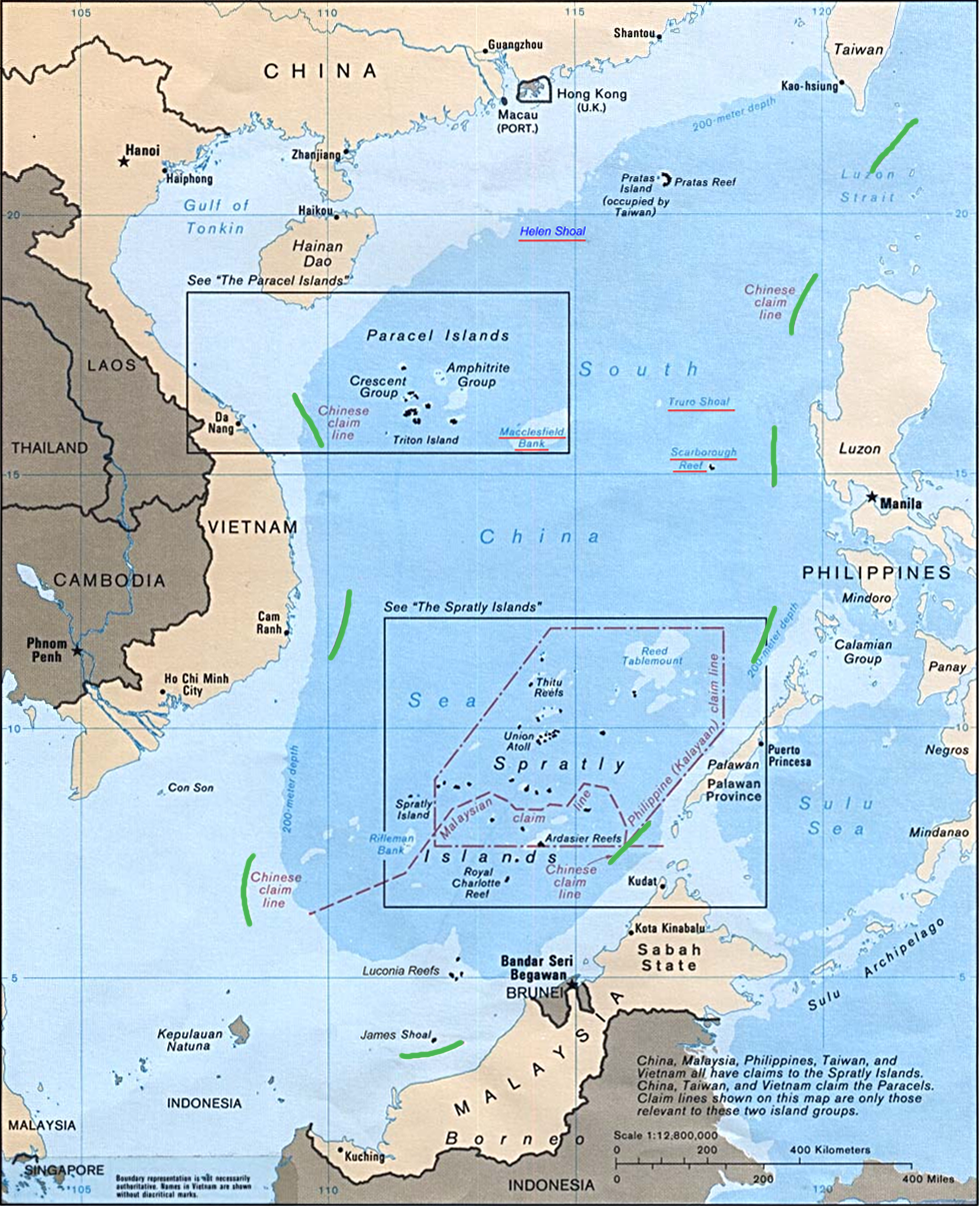
Nine-dash line

The South China Sea disputes involve both island and maritime claims of China and the claims of several neighboring sovereign states in the region, namely Brunei, the Republic of China (ROC/Taiwan), Indonesia, Malaysia, the Philippines, and Vietnam. The disputes are over islands, reefs, banks, and other features in the South China Sea, including the Spratly Islands, Paracel Islands, Scarborough Shoal, boundaries in the Gulf of Tonkin, and the waters near the Indonesian Natuna Islands. The main point of criticism is that the PRC is building artificial islands to extend its claims into other nations' territorial waters and militarizing the islands. Chinese salami slicing strategy and cabbage tactics describe the way the PRC has used small provocations to increase its strategic position.

==== Tibet policy ====
Tibetan Review evaluated the China's government policy on Tibet as colonial based on several criteria, including "forced penetration of the colonizing group", "social destructiveness", "external political control", "economic dependence of internal groups", "sub-standard social services", and "social stratification".

== Culture and media ==
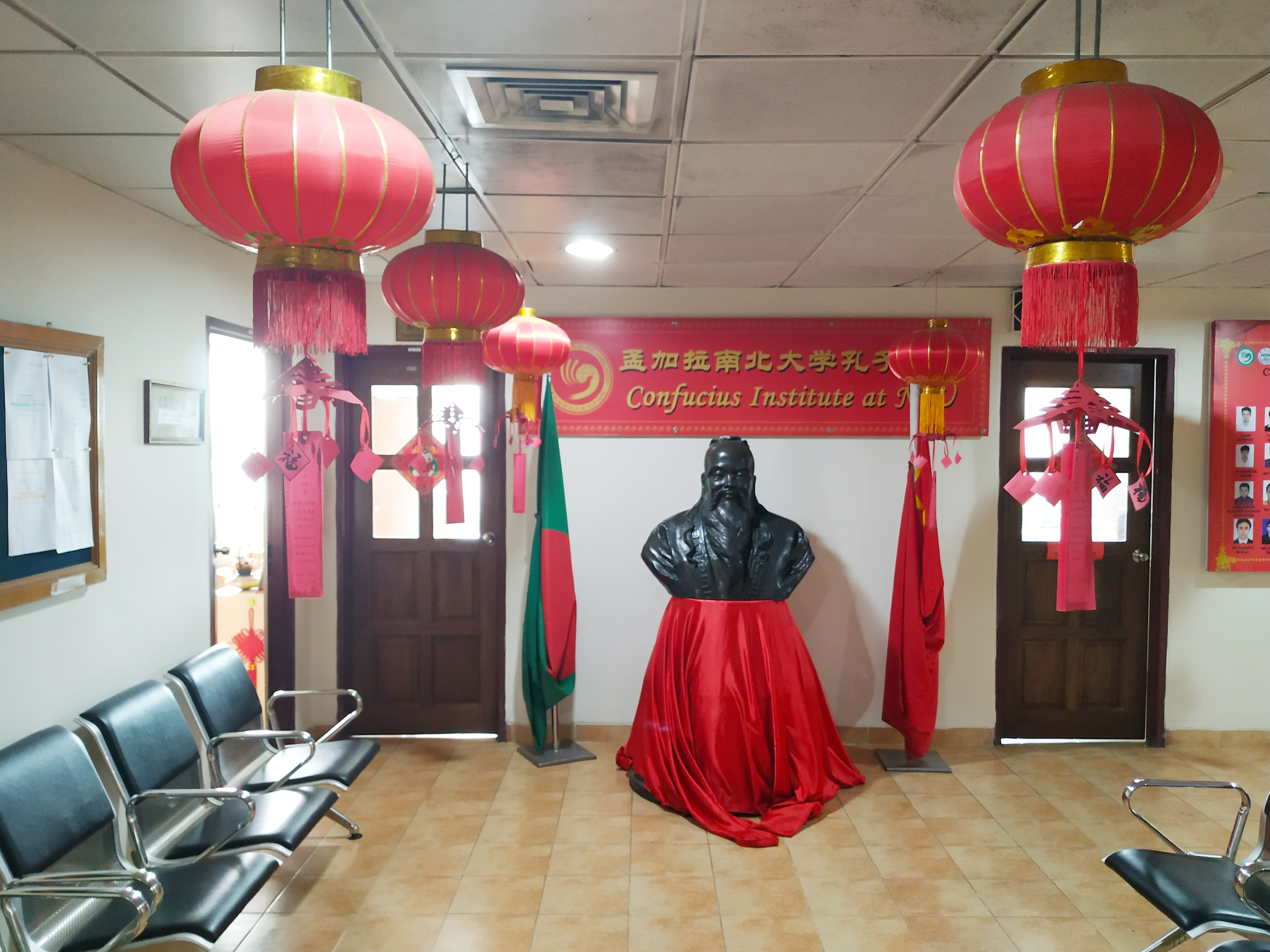
Confucius Institute and Confucius statue at North South University, Bangladesh

Global media and international communication scholars theorize, research, analyze, discuss, and debate the dimensions of China's media and cultural imperialism. Building upon the frameworks of media imperialism and cultural imperialism, researchers have focused on everything from the international expansion of China's Internet companies and movie industries to the "soft power" and public diplomacy campaigns of China's state media companies in other countries as examples of media imperialism.

Some Western and non-Western news media stories have also begun to frame China as an incipient media and cultural imperialist. For example, CNN notes that Confucius Institutes have been criticized for promoting a political narrative or surveilling overseas Chinese instead of solely promoting Chinese culture. Also, according to The Diplomat, Korean commentators have said that there is a dimension of cultural imperialism by China, including China's censorship of Korean content and claiming some Korean historical figures as Chinese.

== In politics ==
Traditional Taiwanese independence activists advocate the establishment of a "Republic of Taiwan" in line with Taiwanese national self-determination, which is not influenced by Chinese imperialism; in the late 1980s, the short-lived far-left Taiwan Revolutionary Party, defended Taiwan's independence from a Marxist-Leninist perspective, criticizing the "People's Republic of China" as "great power" (列強). Many Taiwanese nationalists compared Taiwan under Kuomintang rule to South Africa under apartheid. The Taipei Times linked the CCP's term "united front" to Chinese imperialism and expansionism.

Hong Kong's Trotskyist political organization Socialist Action criticizes CCP-led "Chinese imperialism" for its political repression and economic colonization of Hong Kong.

Freedom House also reported that China has supported authoritarian dictatorships in internet censorship and cyber surveillance, advancing the PRC's political model, having "supplied telecommunications hardware, advanced facial-recognition technology, and data-analytics tools to a variety of governments with poor human rights records, which could benefit Chinese intelligence services as well as repressive local authorities".

== Overseas military presence ==
Map of Chinese overseas military bases according to one report which was published in The Economist: China Countries with a Chinese base Countries that China has probably approached to host a base

China has one official overseas base in Djibouti but probably has approached other countries as well.

| Country | Location | Details |
|---|---|---|
| Cambodia | Preah Sihanouk province | China-funded expansions at the Ream Naval Base characterized as a base for the People's Liberation Army Navy. Cambodia's government emphasizes that the naval base is under joint control. |
| Djibouti | Djibouti City | People's Liberation Army Support Base, China's inaugural overseas military base. |
| Tajikistan | Gorno-Badakhshan | Unofficial joint base intended to support operations in response to the security situation in Afghanistan, see People's Armed Police § International operations. |
| Laos | Vientiane province | Jointly maintained and operated training center and aviation academy facilities at the Ban Keun Airport. |

== Debates ==
There are fierce debates among left-wing intellectuals in China and around the world about whether China has become an imperialist country. Li Minqi, a member of the Chinese New Left, believes that China is becoming increasingly important in the global capitalist system, but is still "semi-peripheral" rather than an imperialist country. Wang Hui is also critical of China's changes: he argues in New Left Review that China has become one of the "strategic partners" of imperialism, and that any analysis that attempts to point out the social issues would be accused of wanting to "return to the days of the Cultural Revolution".

The Communist Party of the Philippines (CPP), a Maoist party of the Philippines, views the CCP as an imperialist party attacking Filipino fishermen and the Filipino people, and in collusion with Duterte. "The CCP pays lip service to Mao occasionally, especially in happy rituals, and avoids offending the great number of Chinese people and party cadres and members who love his memory and agree with his ideas and deeds," said Jose Maria Sison, a key figure in the party. The New People's Army, the armed wing of the CPP, has been ordered to attack Chinese businesses in the Philippines due to the territorial disputes in the South China Sea and dissatisfaction with Chinese investments.

In 2020, the Japanese Communist Party (JCP) criticized the CCP for engaging in "great-power chauvinism and hegemonism" and describe it as "an adverse current to world peace and progress". The JCP also removed a line from its platform which described China as a country "that is beginning a new quest for socialism". JCP members have stated that this was due to human rights conditions in China. The Ministry of Foreign Affairs of China denounced the accusations of the JCP as "groundless and biased".

In a 2017 paper David A. Lake argued the autocratic system of the People's Republic of China would "make it harder for the country to commit credibly to limits on its authority over others. [...] In the absence of such credible restraints, potential subordinates will be far more reluctant to accept the authority of China over their affairs. It will be harder for China to build international hierarchies in the twenty-first century than it was for Britain or the United States during their respective rises to power."

Edward Wong, former Beijing bureau chief of The New York Times, believes that both China and the United States are empires, and the US as an empire is known for its soft power, while China is known for its hard power. Tanner Mirrlees, a political economist, conducted a comparative analysis of the economic, military and media-technological power of the United States and China. He argues: "the United States and China are clearly the world's most significant imperial powers... but not yet equal powers because the United States outmatches China in many ways. If there is an incipient inter-imperialist rivalry between the United States and China, it is an asymmetrical one because the United States possesses greater structural capacities and resources to achieve its goals in world affairs than China currently does."

Chinese exceptionalists and nationalists such as Zhang Weiwei argue that China has never been a global imperialist force in its thousands of years of history.

== See also ==
- Anti–People's Republic of China sentiment
- Chinese irredentism
- Chinese expansionism
- Sinocentrism
- Territorial disputes of the People's Republic of China
