= Rui'an dialect =

Dialect of Wenzhounese Wu Chinese

Ruian dialect
- 瑞安話
- Pronunciation: [zʉ˦ø˧ɦo˨]
- Native to: China
- Region: Wenzhou prefecture, Zhejiang province
- Native speakers
- Language family: Sino-Tibetan: Sinitic; Chinese; Wu; Oujiang; Ruian dialect

Language codes
- ISO 639-3: –
- Glottolog: None

The Ruian dialect (Chinese: 瑞安話; pronounced [zʉ˦ø˧ɦo˨] in the Rui'an dialect; standard pinyin: Ruì'ānhuà) is a dialect of Wu Chinese spoken in Ruian. It belongs to the Oujiang sub-group of Wu Chinese dialects. It is closely related to the Pingyang dialect and Lucheng dialect, generally referred to as Wenzhounese.

== Phonology ==
=== Initials ===
		Labial	Labiodental	Dental	Palatal	Velar	Glottal
Nasal	tenuis	ʔm 猫		ʔn 嬭	ʔȵ 蛲	ʔŋ	
Nasal	voiced	m 迷		n 拿	ȵ 寧	ŋ 咬	
Plosive	aspirated	pʰ 怕		tʰ 聽		kʰ 空	
Plosive	tenuis	p 巴		t 丁		k 公	ʔ 愛
Plosive	voiced	b 爬		d 停		ɡ 爻	
Affricate	aspirated			tsʰ 寸	tɕʰ 氣		
Affricate	tenuis			ts 增	tɕ 九		
Affricate	voiced			dz 茶	dʑ 求		
Fricative	voiceless		f 方	s 森	ɕ 想		h 好
Fricative	voiced		v 會	z 時			ɦ 紅
Approximant	tenuis	ʔw 灣	ʔʋ 歪	ʔl 拉	ʔj 腰		
Approximant	voiced	w 換		l 辣	j 藥		

=== Finals ===
Rui'an has the following finals:

嘸 [m], 兒 [ŋ]

姹 [a], 好 [ɛ], 包 [ɔ]

海 [e̝], 先 [i], 思 [ɿ]

下 [o̝], 布 [ʉ] ~ 圖 [ɘʉ] ~ 水 [ʮ]

全 [y], 安 [ø], 歌 [ʋ̩ʷ]

會 [ɐi], 走 [ɐu̜]

李 [ei], 六 [əu̜]

涼 [iɛ], 關 [uɔ], 花 [uo̝]

經 [ɐŋ], 聽 [əŋ], 公 [oŋ].

Additional finals for older accents include

天 [ie̝], 橋 [yø], 頭 [iəu̜]

=== Tones ===
In the Ruian dialect, a monosyllabic word can have one of the eight tones, but there are only four phonetically distinguished tones, divided into high (陰) and low (陽) categories. In combination with another tone, it can change depending on the tone sandhi system.

Yin Ping 陰平 [˦] 44 江天飛三

Yang Ping 陽平 [˧˩] 31 來同魚球

Yin Shang 陰上 [˧˥] 35 懂紙古本

Yang Shang 陽上 [˨˦] 24 近淡厚似

Yin Qu 陰去 [˥˨] 52 對去貨歲

Yang Qu 陽去 [˨] 22 外地路住

Yin Ru 陰入 [˧˨˧] 323 七博塔各

Yang Ru 陽入 [˨˩˨] 212 六肉白石

=== Tone sandhi ===
In bisyllabic words, the Rui'an dialect phonetically has only six tones, high flat ˦, middle flat ˧, rising ˨˦, departing ˦˨, entering ˨˩˨ and short ˨. We'll now use A, B, C, D, E, and 0 for these six tones.

tones	陰平	陰上	陰去	陰入	陽平	陽上	陽去	陽入
陰平	0A	AC	ED	AE	AD	Example	Example	Example
陰上	AB	0C	D0	AE	D0	Example	Example	Example
陰去	Example	Example	Example	D0	Example	0C	Example	Example
陰入	Example	Example	E0	Example	Example	Example	Example	E0
陽平	AE	Example	0C	Example	Example	Example	Example	Example
陽上	Example	Example	Example	Example	Example	Example	Example	Example
陽去	0A	Example	C0	Example	Example	Example	C0	Example
陽入	0A	0C	Example	Example	Example	Example	Example	Example

== Grammar ==
=== Adverbs ===
Ruian dialect

== Lexicon ==
=== Pronouns ===
Pronoun	IPA	Transcription
1st person sing.	ŋ˧˦	吾
2nd person sing.	ȵi˧˦	爾
3rd person sing.	ɡe̝˧˩	渠/佢
reflexive sing.	zɿ˨	自
1st person plur.	ŋ˨˦ le̝˨, ŋ˨˦ la˨	吾俚， 吾啦
2nd person plur.	ȵi˨˦ le̝˨, ȵi˨˦ la˨	爾俚， 爾啦
3rd person plur.	ɡe̝˦˨ le̝˨, ɡe̝˦˨ la˨	渠/佢俚，渠/佢啦
reflexive plur.	zɿ˧ le̝˨, zɿ˧ la˨	自俚， 自啦

=== Numerals ===
Numerals	IPA	Transcription
0	ləŋ˧˩, dø˧˦	零, 斷^{1}
1	ʔja˧˨˧, i˧˨˧	一^{1} ^{2}
2	ŋ˨, la˧˦	二, 兩^{1}
3	sɔ˦	三
4	sɿ˥˨	四
5	ŋ˧˦	五
6	ləu̜˧˨˧	六
7	tsʰa˧˨˧	七
8	po̝˧˨˧	八
9	tɕɐu̜˧˥	九
10	za˨˩˨	十
20	ȵiɛ˨	廿
30	sɔ˧ za˧	三十
100	i˨ pa˧˨˧	一百
1000	i˨ tɕʰi˧	一千
10.000	i˨ mɔ˧	一萬

^{1} used when are alone or follow 第 to form ordinal numerals, and the later three lectures are cardinal numerals and are generally followed by a classifier.
^{2} the first lecture is considered literal, the second colloquial.

=== Vocabulary ===
Below is a list of the most common vocabulary in Ruian dialect.

Meaning	IPA	Transcription	Mandarin equivalent
to see, to look	[tsʰɿ˥˨]	眥	看
to hear, to listen	[tʰəŋ˦]	聽	聽
to ask	[mɐŋ˨]	問	問
to look for	[zɐŋ˧˩]	尋	找， 尋找
to smell	[hoŋ˥˨]	嗅	聞
to know	[sei˧˨˧]	識	認識
to say, to speak	[ko̝˧˥]	講	說
to curse	[kɐŋ˥˨]	謴	罵
to eat	[tɕʰi˧˨˧]	喫	吃
to drink	[hɔ˧˨˧]	呷	喝
chopstick	[dzei˨]	箸	筷子
to stand	[ɡe̝˧˦]	徛	站
pocket	[tɐu̜˦]	兜	口袋
salted vegetables	[tsʰe̝˨˩˨ ɦɔ˨]	菜鹹	鹹菜
chopping block	[pɔ˧ tsɐŋ˨˦]	板砧	砧板
icing sugar	[do̝˨ ɕo̝˧]	糖霜	糖霜
thing, object	[ʔmʉ˦ zɿ˧]	物事	東西
rice spoon	[vɔ˦ tɕiɛ˧]	飯槳	飯勺
radish	[tsʰe̝˨˩˨ dəu̜˨]	菜頭	蘿蔔
trouble	[sa˦ zəu̜˨˦]	生受	麻煩
doctor	[i˧ sɿ˧]	醫師	醫生
blind	[ʔmo̝˨˩˨ do̝˨]	盲瞊	瞎子
wife	[lɛ˦ ʔø˧]	老安	老婆
unfamiliar	[ta˦ sa˧]	打生	陌生
eagle	[ta˧ ʔjɐŋ˧]	咄鷹	貓頭鷹
mole cricket	[tʰɘʉ˦ kɐu̜˨˦]	土狗	蝼蛄
bicycle	[dɔ˨ tɕɔ˦ tsʰo̝˧]	踏腳車	自行车
instrument	[ko̝˨ sa˦ fʋ̩ʷ˨˦]	家生货	家具
young, teenager	[ɦɐu̜˧ sa˨˩˨ ŋ˨]	後生兒	年輕人
serious， powerful	[dəu̜˦ bei˨ tɕiɛ˧]	肚皮掌	厲害

=== Readings ===
Like other Wu dialects, in the Ruian dialect a Chinese character can have more than one reading, divided into vernacular readings (白讀) and literary readings (文讀), in comparison with other Wu dialects, the Ruian dialect has relatively few multiple readings. Below are some samples.

Hanzi	Vernacular			Literary		
Hanzi	reading	transcription	meaning	reading	transcription	meaning
人	sɐŋ ȵɐŋ	新人	bride	koŋ zɐŋ	工人	worker
日	ne̝ tsɿ	日子	day	za dʑi	日期	date
問	mɐŋ ɦɛ	問號	question mark	vɐŋ dei	問題	question
無	ŋ tɔ	無膽	despondent	vʋ̩ʷ jo̝	無用	useless
龍	tsei lo̝	紙龍	kite	kʰoŋ loŋ	恐龍	dinosaur
女	na ŋ	女兒	daughter	ȵy zɿ	女士	lady

== See also ==
- Shanghainese, another Wu Chinese dialect
- Suzhou dialect
- Ruian, the city
- Wenzhounese, of which the variety of Rui'an is considered a dialect
