= China–Laos relations =

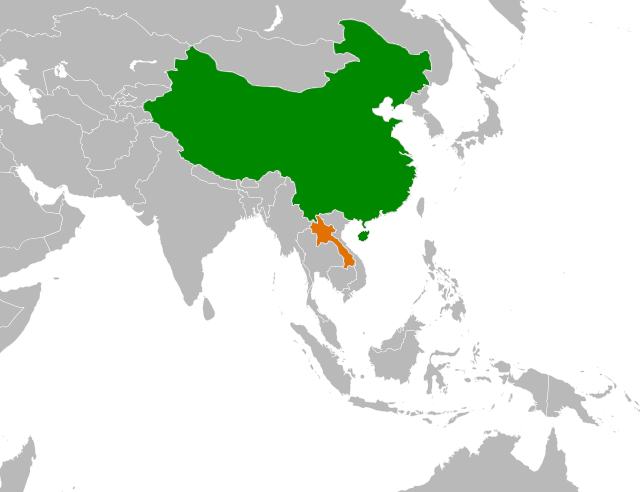
- China: Laos

Diplomatic mission
- Embassy of China, Vientiane: Embassy of Laos, Beijing

China–Laos relations (Lao: ສາຍພົວພັນ ລາວ-ຈີນ, simplified Chinese: 中老关系; traditional Chinese: 中寮關係) refers to the current and historical relationship between the Lao People's Democratic Republic and the People's Republic of China.

== History ==
The Lao kingdom of Lan Xang and its successor states were tributaries of Ming and later Qing China. In the late 15th century, the Chinese backed Lan Xang against their common rival, the Vietnamese. Chinese traders operated in Lan Xang like any other Southeast Asian country, however, Lan Xang also proved to be important as a participant in the Tea-Horse Road trade.

=== Modern times ===
Relations between the two states were re-established in 1953 with the Republic of China (Nationalist China or Taiwan) as the sole legitimate government of China. On 25 April 1961, Laos switched recognition to the PRC government in Beijing. However, on 16 May 1962, the royal government severed diplomatic relations with the PRC and restored relations with the Republic of China. Recognition was changed again in 1975 when the new Lao communist government re-established relations with the PRC.

Vietnam's invasion of Cambodia in December 1978 to unseat the Khmer Rouge regime provoked China into a limited invasion of Vietnam—approximately nineteen kilometers deep—to "teach Vietnam a lesson." Laos was caught in a dangerous bind, not wanting to further provoke China, but not able to oppose its special partner, Vietnam. The Laotian leadership survived the dilemma by making slightly delayed pronouncements in support of Vietnam after some intraparty debate and by sharply reducing diplomatic relations with China to the chargé d'affaires level—without a full break. The low point in China-Laotian relations came in 1979, with reports of Chinese assistance and training of Hmong resistance forces under General Vang Pao in China's Yunnan Province.

This hostile relationship gradually softened, however, and in 1989 Diplomatic and party-to-party relations were normalized, and Prime Minister Kaysone Phomvihane paid a state visit to Beijing. In 1991 Kaysone chose to spend his vacation in China rather than make his customary visit to the Soviet Union. Trade expanded from the local sale of consumer goods to the granting of eleven investment licenses in 1991—including an automotive assembly plant. Following the establishment of the Laotian-Chinese Joint Border Committee in 1991, meetings held during 1992 resulted in an agreement delineating their common border. China's commercial investments and trade with Laos expanded quietly, but not dramatically, in 1993 and 1994.

In November 2010, Laos and China signed a security cooperation agreement. General Secretary of the Chinese Communist Party Xi Jinping held talks with LPRP general secretary Bounnhang Vorachit in 2016, seeking further coordination in international affairs. In June 2020, Laos was one of 53 countries that backed the Hong Kong national security law at the United Nations. In December 2025, chairman of the National Committee of the Chinese People's Political Consultative Conference Wang Huning visited Laos to attended celebrations for the 50th anniversary of the Lao People's Democratic Republic, where he met with LPRP general secretary Thongloun Sisoulith.

== Economy ==
Relations have consisted of trade and aid, largely focused on road construction in the northern provinces of Laos, without directly challenging the interests of Thailand or Vietnam in the central and southern regions. China remains Laos' largest creditor, accounting for approximately half of Laos' government debt as of 2023.

The Golden Triangle Special Economic Zone is a significant point of economic contact between China and Laos. The Chinese firm Kings Romans group was granted a 99-year lease to develop the SEZ into a gambling and tourist destination.

According to the World Bank, by the end of 2021, Laos's public debt had grown to 88% of gross domestic product, with Chinese creditors accounting for a 47% share of foreign debt. In addition, Laos owes 11% of its debt to China from bilateral loans.

Effective 1 December 2024, China eliminated tariffs for goods imported from all of the countries that the United Nations categorizes as least developed and with which China has diplomatic relations, including Laos.

=== Belt and Road Initiative ===
During a 2017 visit to Vientiane by Xi, the two countries announced the Laos-China Economic Corridor. In 2018, Laos joined China's Belt and Road Initiative (BRI). The most important BRI project in Laos is the Vientiane-Boten Railway which was completed in 2021. It runs from the capital of Laos to the Chinese border. It is part of the broader China-Laos Railway, which the two countries operate as a joint venture through the Laos-China Railway Company. Like China, Laos is a major supporter of the Pan-Asian Railway, given its desire to move from a land-locked economy to a land-linked economy.

== Political relations ==
Laos follows the one China principle and considers Taiwan to be "an inalienable part" of China. Laos also supports all efforts by the PRC to "achieve national reunification" and opposes Taiwan independence. Within ASEAN, Laos is often supportive of China, particularly in decreasing the possibility of an ASEAN consensus for taking a harsher stance against China on territorial disputes in the South China Sea. According to academic Alfred Gerstl, the shared ideology of communism helps facilitate cooperation between Laos and China.

== Military relations ==
In October 2026, China's Ministry of National Defense announced that the China-Laos Joint Support and Training Center and the China-Laos Friendship Aviation Academy were now operational at Ban Keun Airport. According to satellite imagery, construction on the new airfield began in late 2025 and was continuing as of early October 2026.

== See also ==
- China–Laos border

== Bibliography ==
- Cardenal, Juan Pablo; Araújo, Heriberto (2011). La silenciosa conquista china (in Spanish). Barcelona: Crítica. pp. 183–186, 230–232. ISBN 9788498922578.
