= Su Beng =

Taiwanese historian

- 史明
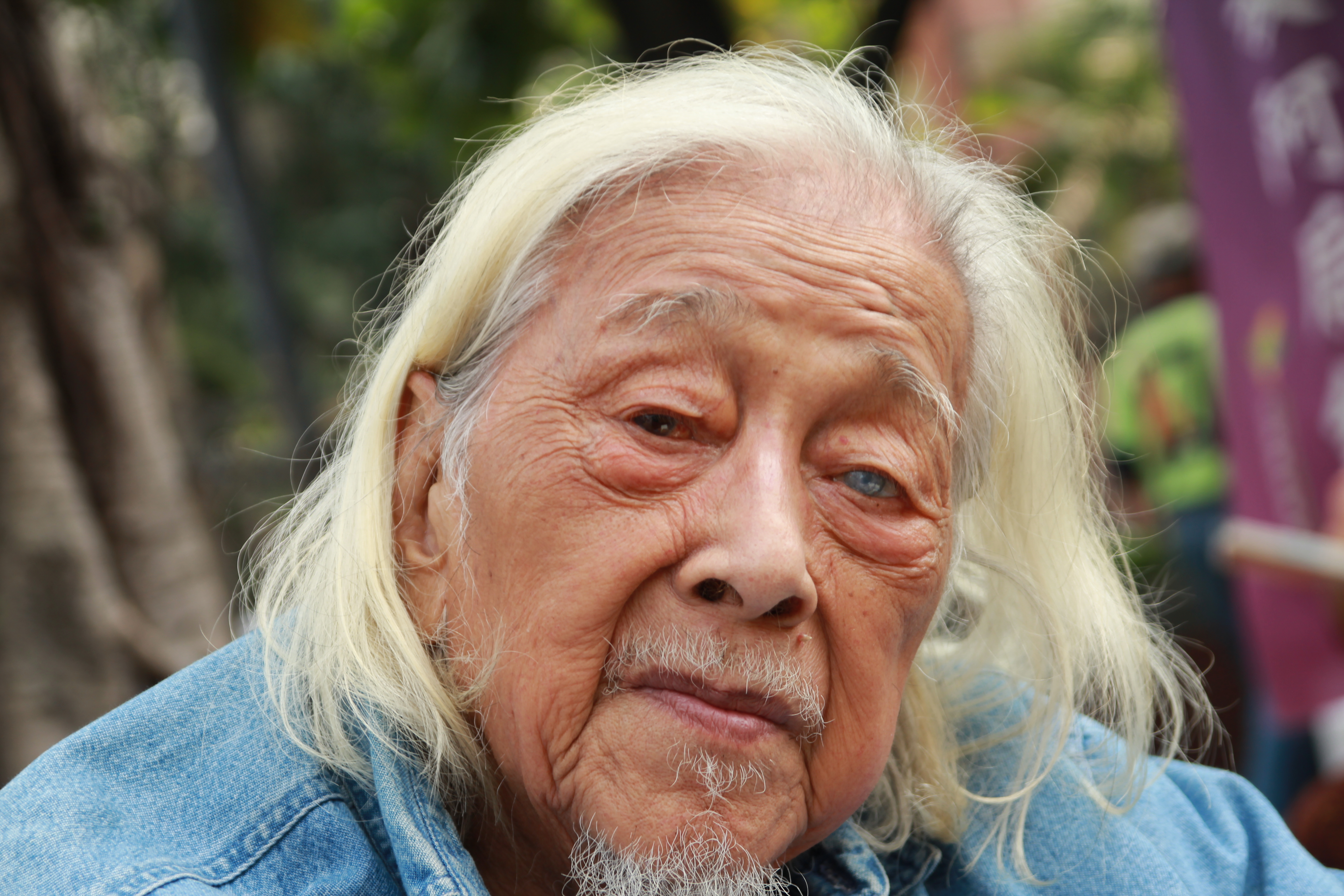
- Su in 2014

Senior Advisor to the President
- In office November 9, 2016 – September 20, 2019
- President: Tsai Ing-wen
- Vice President: Chen Chien-jen

Personal details
- Born: Lim Tiau-hui; November 9, 1918 Shirin Town, Taihoku Prefecture, Taiwan
- Died: September 20, 2019 (aged 100) Taipei, Taiwan
- Party: Chinese Communist Party (1943–1949); Taiwan Independence Revolutionary Armed Force (1950); Independent (1949–2019)
- Education: Waseda University (BA, BEc)
- Nickname: Ozisan (おじさん)

Chinese name
- Chinese: 史明
Transcriptions
Standard Mandarin
- Hanyu Pinyin: Shǐ Míng
- Bopomofo: ㄕˇㄇㄧㄥˊ
- Wade–Giles: Shih^{3} Ming^{2}
- Tongyong Pinyin: Shǐh Míng
Southern Min
- Hokkien POJ: Sú Bêng
- Tâi-lô: Sú Bîng

Su Beng (Chinese: 史明; pinyin: Shǐ Míng; Pe̍h-ōe-jī: Sú-bêng; 9 November 1918 – 20 September 2019), (Note: Born Lîm Tiâu-hui (林朝暉; Lîm Tiâu-hui; Lín Cháohuī; Lin² Ch'ao²-Hui¹) and later known as Si Tiâu-hui (施朝暉; Shī Cháohuī; Shih¹ Ch'ao²-Hui¹; Si Tiâu-hui).) was a Taiwanese revolutionary, historian, and political activist. Widely regarded as a founder of the Taiwan independence movement, Su was an advocate of Taiwanese left-wing nationalism in the socialist sense and was a member of the Taiwan independence Left who opposed Japanese and Chinese imperialism.

== Early years and exile ==
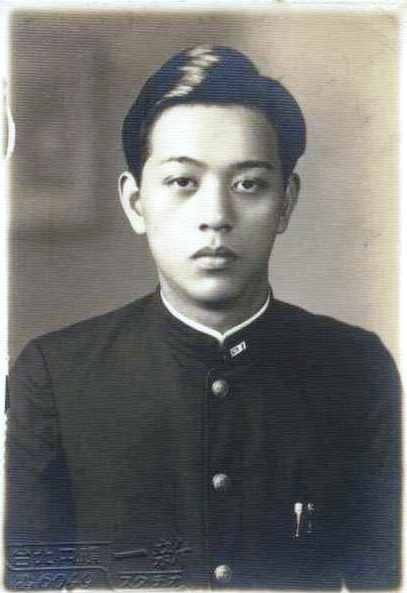
Su Beng as a student at Waseda University

Su was born on November 9, 1918, in Shirin Town, Taihoku Chō, Japanese Taiwan (modern-day Shilin District of Taipei). His birth name was Lîm Tiâu-hui (林朝暉; Lín Cháohuī; Lin² Ch'ao²-hui¹; Lîm Tiâu-hui). When he was eleven years old, he began using his maternal surname, Shih (施; Shī; Si). He was raised in a middle-class family. His mother, Si A-siu, taught him Confucianism. His father, Lim Tse-tshuan, was an agronomist.

In 1937, Su departed Taiwan to attend college in Japan. After graduating from Waseda University in Tokyo with a degree in political science and economics in 1942, Su left for China where he worked undercover with the Chinese Communist Party (1942–1949). For years, he averted the Chinese Communists’ bids for him to join the party. Finally he escaped from Qingdao to Taiwan, just as the Chinese Nationalist Kuomintang soldiers were retreating to Taiwan. Having returned to Taiwan for about a year, he established the Taiwan Independence Revolutionary Armed Force in 1950 which plotted for the assassination of Generalissimo Chiang Kai-shek. When the Taiwan Independence Revolutionary Armed Force stash of weapons were discovered hidden on land owned by Su Beng's grandmother in 1951, Su Beng was forced to go into hiding.

After several months on the run, he finally fled to Japan in May 1952 by stowing away in a boat exporting bananas. He served four months of detention for attempting to illegally enter the country, but when the Kuomintang reported him missing and wanted for his involvement in the plot to assassinate Chiang Kai-shek, the Japanese government granted him political asylum. Later on in 1954, Su Beng opened up a noodle shop restaurant (新珍味; Sin-tin-bī; 'New Gourmet') in Ikebukuro, Japan. Su Beng used the restaurant/residence as a base to continue his work with the underground Taiwan independence movement. It was also here that he trained burgeoning independence activists and began writing Taiwan’s 400 Year History. The Japanese version of this book was first published in 1962, the Chinese-language version was published in 1980 and an abridged English version was published in 1986.

== Return from exile ==
In 1993, Su Beng returned to reside in Taipei, Taiwan. The following year, April 1994, he began the Taiwan Independence Action motorcade, which he conceived as a way to raise the Taiwanese people’s consciousness. The motorcade makes its rounds from Taipei county to Taipei city, every Saturday and Sunday afternoon, delivering messages calling for Taiwan’s independence and the normalization of Taiwan as a country.

Labeled a radical, violent militant and communist, he was dubbed the "Che Guevara of Taiwan". Several tall tales existed about Su Beng’s controversial life decisions, one of which included electing to have a vasectomy when he was in his twenties while working undercover for the CCP in China.

Su died of pneumonia and multiple organ failure at Taipei Medical University Hospital on 20 September 2019, aged 100.

== Pen name ==
He first used Su Beng (史明, literally "to clearly understand the history") as his pen name for Taiwanese’s 400 Year History in 1962. In choosing his pen name, he wanted to express his motivation for writing the book. Su Beng believed that once the Taiwanese people understand their unique history, they will be able to know who they are, what they want for themselves and their nation. The two characters which make up his name mean "history" and "clear", respectively. Taken together, they may be interpreted as “history clearly”, as in “to know history clearly.”

== See also ==
- Ho Chi Minh
- Cheng Ping
