= Chen Chih-hsiung =

Taiwanese independence activist (1916–1963)

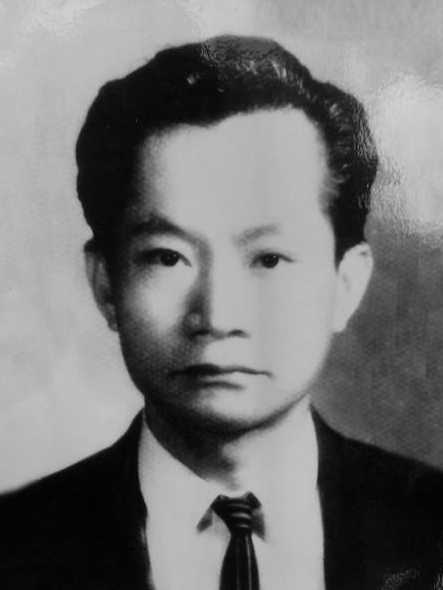
- Born: 18 February 1916; Akō Chō (阿緱廳), Japanese Taiwan (now Pingtung County, Taiwan)
- Died: 28 May 1963 (aged 47); Taipei, Taiwan
- Education: Tokyo University of Foreign Languages

Chinese name
- Traditional Chinese: 陳智雄
- Simplified Chinese: 陈智雄
Transcriptions
Standard Mandarin
- Hanyu Pinyin: Chén Zhìxióng
- Bopomofo: ㄔㄣˊ ㄓˋ ㄒㄩㄥˊ
- Wade–Giles: Ch'en2 Chih4-hsiung2
Southern Min
- Hokkien POJ: Tân Tì-hiông

Chen Chih-hsiung (Chinese: 陳智雄; Pe̍h-ōe-jī: Tân Tì-hiông; 18 February 1916 – 28 May 1963) was a Taiwanese independence activist.

== Biography ==
Chen was born in what was known as Akō Chō, a division of Japanese Taiwan, in 1916. He studied Dutch at the Tokyo University of Foreign Languages, and was also fluent in English, Japanese, Malay, Taiwanese and Mandarin. He was sent by the Japanese government to the Dutch East Indies in 1942, shortly after Japan had begun its occupation of the territory, to serve as a translator. Chen stayed in Indonesia after the end of World War II and found work designing jewelry. He sided with Sukarno in the subsequent Indonesian National Revolution and was imprisoned by the Dutch for a year. After the revolution, Sukarno named Chen an honorary citizen of Indonesia. Chen later joined Thomas Liao's Formosa Democratic Independence Party and helped secure Liao a trip to the Bandung Conference held in 1955. The next year, Liao appointed Chen the ambassador to Southeast Asia upon the formation of the Japan-based Republic of Taiwan Provisional Government. The Indonesian government eventually arrested Chen and rescinded his passport before deporting him. Chen then traveled to Switzerland and was granted citizenship there before moving to Japan to see Liao. The Kuomintang forced Chen's return to Taiwan and asked him to cease his pro-independence advocacy. Despite the Kuomintang authorities' request, Chen founded another pro-independence organization in 1961. The Taiwan Garrison Command arrested Chen for his actions the next year and imprisoned him in a facility on Qingdao Road in Taipei. In 1963, Chen became the first independence activist to be executed in Taiwan.

Chen was survived by his wife Chen Ying-niang, whom he met in Indonesia, and three children.

== See also ==
- Lin Chin-wen
- Cheng Ping
