= International Socialist Forward =

International Socialist Forward 國際社會主義前進
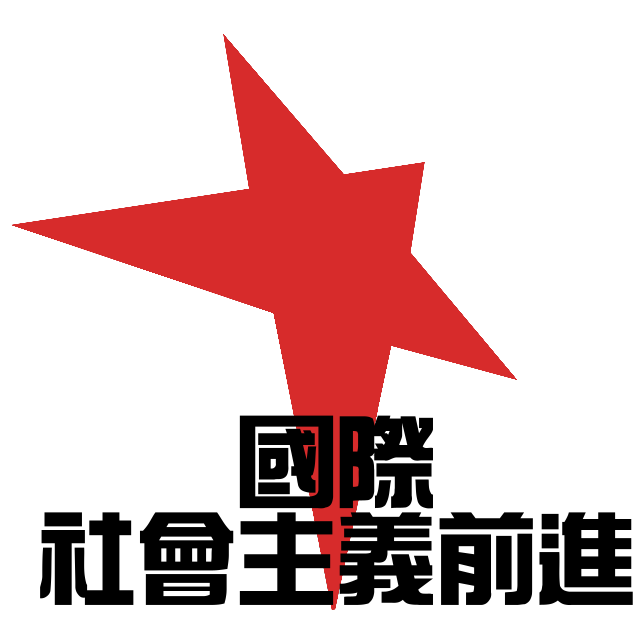
- Founded: 2010 (Formation); November 12, 2016 (Official foundation); March 13, 2021 (Independence from ISA)
- Headquarters: Taipei
- Ideology: Trotskyism; Revolutionary socialism Democratic socialism Taiwan independence Anti-imperialism
- Political position: Far-left
- International affiliation: Committee for a Workers' International (2010–2019); International Socialist Alternative (2019–2021); Internationalist Standpoint (2021–)
- Colors: Red

Website
- https://www.socialism.org.tw/

International Socialist Forward (Chinese: 國際社會主義前進) is a Taiwanese Trotskyist political organization. The organization was formed in 2010 as the Taiwanese branch of the International Socialist Alternative (ISA) as the Taiwanese Socialist Alliance (台湾社会主义者同盟). The name later changed to Workers' International Committee Taiwan (工人国际委员会台湾), before adopting its current name on November 12, 2016, when it was officially founded. The organization broke from the ISA on March 13, 2021, and claims to be the only anti-capitalist revolutionary socialist political organization in Taiwan.

== Ideology ==
The organization believes Taiwanese statehood cannot be achieved through reliance on the Pan-Green Coalition, and must be led by the working class. Through this leadership, the Taiwanese people will unite with the Chinese people, overthrowing the one-party state and capitalism, achieving true independence. This independent, socialist Taiwan will become part of the Asian Socialist Federation. The organization also believes Taiwanese politics are monopolized by the Democratic Progressive Party and the Kuomintang, two bourgeoisie parties, and that the working class must found their own party.

== See also ==
- Taiwan independence Left
