= Wenzhounese =

Wu Chinese language variety

- Oujiang
- 溫州話 / 温州话 ü-cōu-rōo iu1 chiou1 gho6
- Pronunciation: [ʔjy tɕɤu ɦo]
- Native to: Wenzhou, Zhejiang, China
- Region: Southeastern China, and in Wenzhou immigrant populations in New York City; Paris; Milan and Prato, Italy
- Ethnicity: Wenzhounese
- Speakers: 4.92 million (Oujiang) (2012)
- Language family: Sino-Tibetan: Sinitic; Chinese; Wu; Oujiang; Wenzhounese
- Writing system: Chinese characters

Language codes
- ISO 639-3: None (mis)
- ISO 639-6: qjio (Oujiang) wzhu (Wenzhou proper)
- Glottolog: ouji1238
- Linguasphere: 79-AAA-dh (incl. 79-AAA-dhd Wenzhou)

Wenzhounese (simplified Chinese: 温州话; traditional Chinese: 溫州話; pinyin: Wēnzhōuhuà, Wenzhounese: Iu Chiu ho), also known as Oujiang (瓯江话; 甌江話; Ōujiānghuà), Tong Au (东瓯片; 東甌片; Dōng'ōupiàn) or Au Nyü (瓯语; 甌語; Ōuyǔ), is the language spoken in Wenzhou, the southern prefecture of Zhejiang, China. It is the most divergent division of Wu Chinese, with little to no mutual intelligibility with other Wu dialects or any other variety of Chinese. It features noticeable elements in common with Min Chinese, which is spoken to the south in Fujian. Oujiang is sometimes used as the broader term, and Wenzhou for Wenzhounese proper in a narrow sense.

Given its long history and the isolation of the region in which it is spoken, Wenzhounese is so unusual in its phonology that it has the reputation of being the least comprehensible dialect for an average Mandarin speaker. It preserves a large amount of vocabulary of classical Chinese lost elsewhere, earning itself the nickname "the living fossil", and has distinct grammatical differences from Mandarin.

Wenzhounese is one of five varieties of Chinese other than Standard Mandarin used for broadcasting by China Radio International, alongside Cantonese, Hokkien, Teochew, and Hakka.

== Classification ==
Wenzhounese is part of the Wu group of Chinese dialects, sharing many linguistic features with them. These are spoken over the Zhejiang and south Jiangsu provinces. Wenzhounese is seen as a typical representative of southern Wu.

== Geographic distribution ==
Wenzhounese is spoken primarily in Wenzhou and the surrounding southern portion of Zhejiang, China. To a lesser extent, it is also spoken in scattered pockets of Fujian in southeastern China. Overseas, it is spoken in increasingly larger communities in the United States in Flushing Chinatown in the Queens borough of New York City, and the Chinatowns in Brooklyn in New York City. Wenzhounese is also spoken by some Overseas Chinese communities in Europe, in particular Italy, France, and Spain. It is used more widely among the Chinese people in Italy than Mandarin. Over 80% of the Chinese diaspora that are resident in the city of Prato, Tuscany, were born in Zhejiang Province.

== Dialects ==
Wenzhounese can be generally divided into the following three dialects:

- Northern Dialect, including dialects spoken in Wenzhou, Ouhai, Yongqiong, Yongjia.
- Southern Dialect, including Rui'an dialect, Wencheng dialect, Longgang dialect, Pingyang dialect, etc.
- Northeastern Dialect, which is spoken in the city of Yueqing.

The most important difference between eastern Wenzhounese dialects such as Wencheng and Wenzhou proper are tonal differences (Wencheng has no falling tones) and the retention of /f/ before /o/:

	八	风	到	晓得
Pinyin (Standard Mandarin)	bā	fēng	dào	xiǎodé
Wenzhou	pʊ	hoŋ	tɜ	ɕiate
Wencheng	po	foŋ	tɶ	ɕɔti

The tones of all other Oujiang dialects are similar to Wenzhounese.

== Phonology ==
=== Consonants ===
Consonants of the Wenzhou dialect
		Labial	Alveolar	(Alveolo-) palatal	Velar	Glottal
Nasal		m	n	ɲ̟	ŋ	
Plosive	voiced	b	d		ɡ	
Plosive	voiceless	p	t		k	
Plosive	aspirated	pʰ	tʰ		kʰ	
Affricate	voiced		dz	dʑ		
Affricate	voiceless		ts	tɕ		
Affricate	aspirated		tsʰ	tɕʰ		
Fricative	voiceless	f	s	ɕ		h
Fricative	voiced	v	z			ɦ
Approximant			l (Note: /l/ is lateral, and /j/ is palatal.)	j		

=== Vowels ===
Vowels of the Wenzhou dialect
	Front		Central	Back
	Unrounded	Rounded	Central	Back
Close	i	y	ɨ	u
Close-mid	e	ø		o
Open-mid	ɛ		ɜ	
Open	a			
Diphthong	ai au ei øy ɤu/ou iɛ uɔ/yɔ			

The only coda is the velar nasal, in /aŋ eŋ oŋ/ and syllabic [ŋ̍].

=== Tone ===
==== Citation tones ====
Wenzhou has three phonemic tones. While it has eight phonetic tones, most of these are predictable: The yīn–yáng tone split dating from Middle Chinese still corresponds to the voicing of the initial consonant in Wenzhou, and the shǎng tones are abrupt and end in glottal stop (this has been used as evidence for a similar situation independently posited for Old Chinese). The rù tones, however, are unusual in being distinct despite having lost their final stops; in addition, the vowel has lengthened, and the tone has become more complex than the other tones (though some speakers may simplify them to low falling or rising tones).

Tone chart of Wenzhou dialect
Tone number	Tone name	Tone contour
1	yīn píng (陰平)	˧ 33
2	yáng píng (陽平)	ʱ˧˩ 31
3	yīn shǎng (陰上)	˧˥ʔ 35
4	yáng shǎng (陽上)	ʱ˨˦ʔ 24
5	yīn qù (陰去)	˦˨ 42
6	yáng qù (陽去)	ʱ˩ 11
7	yīn rù (陰入)	˧˨˧ː 323
8	yáng rù (陽入)	ʱ˨˩˨ː 212

The shǎng and rù tones are barely distinguishable apart from the voicing of the initial consonant, and so are phonetically closer to two tones than four. Chen (2000) summarizes the tones as M & ML (ping), MH (shǎng), HM & L (qu), and dipping (MLM, rù); not only are the píng and qù pairs obviously distinct phonetically, but they behave as four different tones in the ways they undergo tone sandhi.

As in Shanghainese, in Wenzhounese only some of the syllables of a phonological word carry tone. In Wenzhounese there may be three such syllables, with the tone of any subsequent (post-tonic) syllables determined by the last of these. In addition, there may be pre-tonic syllables (clitics), which take a low tone. However, in Wenzhounese only one tonic word may exist in a prosodic unit; all other words are reduced to low tone.

==== Tone sandhi ====
Up to three tonic syllables may occur together, but the number of resulting tones is reduced by tone sandhi. Of the six phonetic tones, there are only fourteen lexical patterns created by two tonic syllables. With one exception, the shǎng and qù tones reduce to HM (yīn qù) before any other tone, and again with one exception, the rù tone does not interact with a following tone. The shǎng and rù tones change a preceding non-rù tone to HM, and are themselves never affected.

lexical sandhi		2nd syllable					
lexical sandhi		-M	-ML	-HM	-L	-MH	-(M)LM
1st syl- a- ble	M-	M.M	L.L	MLM.HM		HM.MH	HM.LM
1st syl- a- ble	ML-	L.M	L.L	MLM.HM		HM.MH	HM.LM
1st syl- a- ble	HM-	HM.M	L.L	HM.ML	HM.L	HM.MH	HM.LM
1st syl- a- ble	L-	HM.M	HM.ML	HM.ML	HM.L	HM.MH	HM.LM
1st syl- a- ble	MH-	HM.M	HM.ML	HM.ML	HM.L	HM.MH	HM.LM
1st syl- a- ble	(M)LM-	(M)LM.M	L.L	(M)LM.HM	(M)LM.L	(M)LM.MH	(M)LM.LM

(Sandhi that are exceptions to the generalizations above are in bold.)

With a compound word of three syllables, the patterns above apply to the last two. The antepenultimate tonic syllable takes only two possible tones, by dissimilation: low if the following syllable (in sandhi form) starts high (HM), high otherwise. So, for example, the unusually long compound noun "daily necessities" (lit., 'firewood-rice-oil-salt-sauce-vinegar-tea') has the underlying tones

|ML.MH.ML.ML.HM.HM.ML|

Per sandhi, the last two syllables become L.L. The antepenult then dissimilates to H, and all pre-tonic syllables become L, for:

/L.L.L.L.H.L.L/

At a phrasal level, these tones may separate, with a HM tone, for example, shifting to the beginning of a phrase. In the lexicalized phrase "radio receiver" ('wireless telephone tube'), the underlying tones are

|ML.HM.L.L.ML|

Per sandhi, the last two become HM.ML. There is no dissimilation, explained by this being grammatically a lexicalized phrase rather than a compound. The HM shifts forward, with intermediate syllables becoming M (the tone the HM leaves off at):

/HM.M.M.M.ML/

Although checked (MLM) syllables rarely change in compound words, they can change in phrases: "tall steel case" is underlyingly M.MLM.HM. The middle syllable shifts to HM, and sandhi operates on this *HM.HM sequence to produce HM.ML. The HM then shifts back, yielding /HM.M.ML/.

Such behaviour has been used to support arguments that contour tones in languages like Chinese are single units and they are independent of vowels or other segments.

== Grammar ==
=== Morphology ===
Wenzhou has a tonal deictic morpheme. To convey the sense of "this", the classifier changes its tone to rù (dipping), and a voiced initial consonant is devoiced. For example, from /pa˧/ 'group' there is /pa˧˨˧/ 'this group', and from /le˧˩/ 'some (people)' there is /l̥e˧˨˧/ 'these (people)'.

== Reputation for eccentricity ==
Wenzhounese is reputed to have been used during the Second Sino-Japanese War during wartime communication via code talkers and in the Sino-Vietnamese War for programming military code. There is a common rhymed saying in China that reflects this comprehension difficulty: "Fear not the Heavens, fear not the Earth, but fear the Wenzhou man speaking Wenzhounese" (天不怕，地不怕，就怕温州人说温州话).

== Examples ==
There are several sub-branches of Oujiang dialects, and some are not mutually intelligible with the Wenzhou city dialect and the Wencheng dialect, but neighboring dialects are often mutually intelligible. For example, there are 2 dialects spoken in Li'ao Village in the Ouhai District of Wenzhou: one spoken in Baimen (白門), where the local people have 姜 as their surname, and one spoken in Wangzhai (王宅), where local people have normally 王 or 黄 as their surname. Their dialects are almost fully mutually intelligible, except for a few vocabulary items. An example would be the word for "garbage" (垃圾), which is /ʔlutsuu/ in the Baimen dialect and /ʔladʒee/ in the Wangzhai dialect.

Numbers in Oujiang Dialects

Dialect	一	两	三	四	五	六	七	八	九	十
Wenzhou	ʔjɐi	liɛ2	sa1	sɨ3	ŋ2	ləɯ	tsʰɐi	pʊ	tɕɐɯ2	zɐi
Rui'an	ʔja	la2	sɔ1	sɨ3	ŋ2	ləɯ	tsʰa	pʊ	tɕɐɯ2	za

== Literature in Wenzhounese ==
A translation of part of the New Testament, specifically the four gospels and the book of Acts, was published in 1894 under the title "Chaò-Chḯ Yi-sû Chī-tuh Sang Iah Sing Shī: Sz̀ fuh-iang tà sź-du 'ae-djüe fa üe-tsiu t'û¹-'ò", with the entire book in Romanized Wenzhou dialect.

== See also ==
- List of varieties of Chinese
- Wenzhounese romanisation
- Suzhou dialect
- Shanghainese
- Hangzhou dialect
