= Taiwan Revolutionary Party =

Taiwan Revolutionary Party 台灣革命黨
- General Secretary: Cary S. Hung
- Founder: Cary S. Hung; Hsu Hsin-liang
- Founded: January 1, 1985
- Dissolved: March 23, 1987
- Ideology: Taiwanese independence Left-wing nationalism Marxism–Leninism; Revolutionary socialism Anti–Chinese nationalism
- Political position: Left-wing to far-left

The Taiwan Revolutionary Party (TRP) was a left-wing nationalist party in Taiwan.

The TRP sought to organize partisans to end the Kuomintang (KMT) rule, stating that it "promotes the independence and foundation of the Taiwanese people" (推動台灣人民獨立建國), and that "the Taiwanese revolution is a national liberation movement" (臺灣革命是一場民族解放運動). The TRP advocated for labor and other social movements and supported the liberation of Taiwanese nation. The TRR also referred to the PRC as "great power" (列強) rather than an anti-imperialist state. So they were against the Chinese Communist Party, although there was a Marxist–Leninist element.

In May 1986, Hsu Hsin-liang defected from the Taiwan Revolutionary Party, saying, "If the KMT sincerely promotes democratization, it has no intention of overthrowing the KMT regime in a revolutionary way". The TRP disbanded on March 23, 1987.

== See also ==
- Anti-imperialism
- Minzu jiefang (民族解放)
- Taiwan independence Left
