= Romanisation of Wenzhounese =

Romanization system for Wenzhounese

The first instance of romanising Wenzhounese begins with the language documentation efforts of Christian missionaries who translated the Bible into many varieties of Chinese in both Chinese characters and in phonetic romanisation systems based largely on the Wade-Giles system. The first romanised form of Wenzhounese can be seen in an 1892 Gospel of Matthew translation.

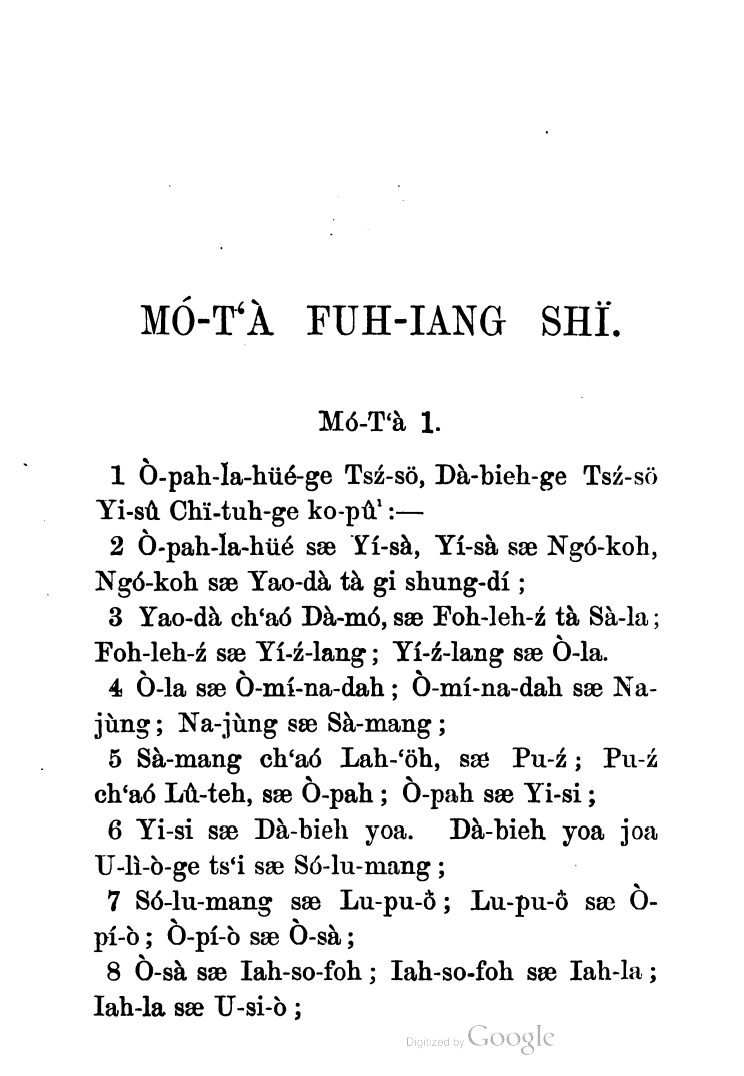
The four Gospels and Acts written in Wenzhounese

== Contemporary ==
In 2004, father-and-son team Shen Kecheng (Chinese: 沈克成; pinyin: Shěn Kèchéng) and Shen Jia (Chinese: 沈迦; pinyin: Shěn Jiā) published the work Wenzhouhua (simplified Chinese: 温州话; traditional Chinese: 溫州話; pinyin: Wēnzhōuhuà), which outlines a systematic method for romanising each initial and rhyme of the dialect.

Its primary orthographic innovation is its means of expressing the three-way distinction of Wu stops in an orthography that distinguishes only two. The Wade-Giles-based systems deal with this as k, k', and g to represent /k/, /kʰ/, and /ɡ/. Since voiced obstruents no longer exist in Standard Chinese, pinyin represents /k/ and /kʰ/ as g and k respectively. The Shens use the same basic method as pinyin and transcribe voiced stops by duplicating the voiced series of letters. Thus /ɡ/ is gg in the system. Likewise, /ɦ/ is transcribed as hh.

They adopt other pinyin conventions, such as x for what is normally transcribed in Chinese usage of the IPA as /ɕ/ and c for /tsʰ/. Thus, the j-jj-q-x series of alveolo-palatal obstruents contrasts with the alveolar series z-zz-c-s-ss.

Vowels are transcribed with a number of digraphs, but few are innovations. The influence of Chinese IMEs is seen in their system as well since v denotes /y/ and ov denotes /œy/. Another way that it diverges from pinyin is in Wenzhounese's unrounded alveolar apical vowel /ɨ/, which is written as ii, since, unlike Mandarin, apical vowels are not in complementary distribution with /i/ in Wenzhounese.

Tones, however, are marked not by diacritics or tone spelling but by simply placing superscript values of Chao's tone lettering system.

=== Rhymes ===
Romanisation	Wugniu	IPA	Example characters
a	a	[a]	矮反鞋媽
ae	ae	[ɛ]	杏鹦行㧸
ai	ai	[ai]	北個國十
au	au	[au]	甌愁狗有
e	eo	[ɜ]	鏖保草否
ee	e	[e]	愛才德黑
ei	ei	[ei]	比池肥式
eu	ou	[ɤu]	臭豆流多
i	i	[i]	野鼻變長
ia	ia	[ia]	丫药着腳
iai	iai	[iai]	乙益甩急
ie	iae	[iɛ]	腰打橫兩
ii	y	[ɨ]	書吃思溪
o	o	[o]	恶茶車學
oe	oe	[ø]	暗半端亂
ov	eu	[øy]	步父婦魚
u	u	[u]	乌部果委
uie	uiae	[uiɛ]	奣
uo	uao	[uɔ]	拗飽當爪
uo	iuao	[yɔ]	壅共双从
v	iu	[y]	溫安干月
n	n	[n̩]	唔
ng	ng	[ŋ̍]	餓二我吳
ang	an	[aŋ]	本分今京
eng	en	[eŋ]	病稱民星
ong	on	[oŋ]	東豐空夢

=== Initials ===
Romanisation	IPA	Example characters
b	[p]	把百半本
bb	[b]	白抱備別
c	[tsʰ]	采草測產
d	[t]	打帶刀島
dd	[d]	大地動頭
f	[f]	反福火分
g	[k]	該高歌工
gg	[ɡ]	厚渠峽跔
h	[h]	風海好黑
hh	[ɦ]	房孩紅華
i	[j]	安溫央也
j	[tɕ]	見叫斤酒
jj	[dʑ]	件舊僅狂
k	[kʰ]	開考科肯
l	[l]	來郎老雷
m	[m]	馬買滿毛
n	[n]	拿內奶男
ny	[ɲ]	你鳥捏女
ng	[ŋ]	礙傲牛瓦
p	[pʰ]	怕拍跑片
q	[tɕʰ]	出窗千春
s	[s]	散掃色殺
ss	[z]	愁詞存靜
t	[tʰ]	他塔湯體
u	[u]	歪彎屋挖
w	[v]	犯肥份飯
x	[ɕ]	少手雙先
y	[j]	床就前全
z	[ts]	雞早進真
zz	[dz]	才茶沉池

== See also ==
- Wenzhounese
- Wu Chinese
- Shanghainese
