= Taiwan's 400 Year History =

1962 book by Su Beng

Taiwan's 400 Year History: The Origins and Continuing Development of the Taiwanese Society and People (Chinese: 台灣人四百年史; pinyin: Táiwān Rén Sìbǎi Nián Shǐ; Pe̍h-ōe-jī: Tâi-oân-lâng 400 Nî Sú; lit. 'Taiwanese people's 400-year history', also known as Modern History of Taiwanese in 400 Years) is a book about the people's history of Taiwan, written by Su Beng, one of the pioneers of Taiwan independence movement.

Su Beng wrote in the forewords to the Japanese edition that he chose to title the book after "Taiwanese people" as opposed to "Taiwan" itself because the oral history he received was too different from existing literature written from a "colonizer perspective". Su Beng felt many advocators of the Taiwan independence movement did not understand the history of Taiwan well, and spent three years writing, in Japanese, the original version of Modern History of Taiwanese in 400 Years in 1962. After another six years, he finished the Chinese version, and the English version was published in 1986. In 1999, he added an appendix for Chinese version. A revised Chinese edition was published in 2004.

A third of the book criticizes the ruling characteristics of Kuomintang. The book also analyzes the basic structure of Taiwan's economy (the productive forces and relations of production), to explain how different social classes in Taiwan were formed, and focuses on different eras of social and international position and trends.

The book was banned during the period of Martial law in Taiwan, but underground circulation exposed many readers, including Lee Teng-hui, to a more indigenous view of Taiwan. The Taiwan Independence Association, famous for being the "last" prosecuted subjects of the Anti-Insurgency Law of 1949, were influenced by this work.

== Versions ==
- Su Beng (1962). 台湾人四百年史 : 秘められた植民地解放の一断面 (in Japanese). Otowa Shobō. OCLC 32349883.
- Su Beng (1980). 台灣人四百年史 [Taiwanese People's 400 Year History] (in Chinese). Paradise Culture Associates. OCLC 28977870.
- Su Beng (1986). Taiwan's 400 Year History: The Origins and Continuing Development of the Taiwanese Society and People. Taiwanese Cultural Grassroots Association. ISBN 9780939367009.
