= Ban Keun Airport =

- IATA: none; ICAO: none

Summary
- Airport type: Military
- Location: Vientiane Province, Laos
- Coordinates: 18°21′6″N 102°35′2″E
- Interactive map of Ban Keun Airport

Ban Keun Airport, formerly known as Lima Site 44, is an airport and military base near Vientiane, Laos jointly operated by Laos and China.

== History ==
Ban Keun Airport was built by the US military and Central Intelligence Agency during the Vietnam War, and used for covert military operations in the 1960s and 1970s.

In September 2026 Ban Keun Airport re-opened, hosting the China-Laos Joint Support and Training Center along with the China-Laos Friendship Aviation Academy.

Ban Keun Airport is among China's network of overseas military facilities, including Ream Naval Base in Cambodia and the People's Liberation Army Support Base in Djibouti.
