= Left-wing nationalism =

Form of nationalism

Left-wing nationalism or leftist nationalism is a form of nationalism which is based upon national self-determination, popular sovereignty, and left-wing political positions such as social equality. Left-wing nationalism can also include anti-imperialism and national liberation movements. Left-wing nationalism often stands in contrast to right-wing politics and national conservatism.

== Terminology ==
Terms such as nationalist socialism, social nationalism and socialist nationalism are not to be confused with the German fascism espoused by the Nazi Party, which called itself National Socialism. This ideology advocated the supremacy and territorial expansion of the German nation, while opposing popular sovereignty, social equality and national self-determination for non-Germans. Left-wing nationalism does not promote the view that one nation is superior to others.

Some left-wing nationalist groups have historically used the term national socialism for themselves, but only before the rise of the Nazis or outside Europe. Since the Nazis' rise to prominence, national socialism has become associated almost exclusively with their ideas and it is rarely used in relation to left-wing nationalism in Europe, with nationalist socialism or socialist nationalism being preferred over national socialism.

== Ideology ==
Left-wing nationalists typically have a socialist (democratic or authoritarian), social democratic, progressive, or societally conservative background (the conservative left) combined with a preference for nation-state sovereignty. Left-wing nationalists therefore strive to reduce the wealth gap in the country, retain control or nationalize public services (such as health, energy and public transport). Left-wing nationalist movements do not tend to advocate supremacy, however, certain forms of left-wing nationalism have adopted xenophobic theses favorable to a homogeneous society, with opposition to immigration. It is important to emphasise that there is not just one type of left-wing nationalism: the nation can be framed in many different ways, which means that left-wing politics drawing on national identity can do so in different manners and with varying levels of inclusiveness.

In this context, left nationalists completely or to a large extent reject neoliberalism and supranational interference. Left-wing nationalists want countries to decide for themselves on issues such as the economy, health and defense.

=== Social democratic nationalism ===
Social democratic nationalism is strongly diffused in certain developing nations but also in part of Europe.

As a European example, the Slovak party Direction – Social Democracy supported a moderate nationalist conception of social democracy in the 2020s which translated into a clear rejection of immigration.

During the campaign for the 2023 Turkish presidential election, the Republican People's Party and its presidential candidate Kemal Kılıçdaroğlu openly adopted a stance against illegal immigration.

The Australian Labor Party had also held a similar line in its history in the 20th century.

=== Social ethno-nationalism ===
Social Ethno-nationalism is a doctrine aimed at promoting social progress while defending the ethnic interests of different peoples, both emancipation and supremacy.

For example, the Australian Labor Party had a strong white nationalist component and has openly supported the White Australia policy in the past.

Secular Arab nationalism advocated by Baathism and previously by Nasserism defends Arab socialism, which emphasizes a secularist and progressive position seeking (at least in principle) to integrate Arab Christians, Alawites, Druze and others by eliminating tribal and sectarian divisions.

Some black nationalism in the United States aimed at defending the interests of African Americans was highly influential in the 1970s with groups like the Black Panthers Party.

South American indigenous groups also have as their basis the defense of the ethnic interests of Amerindians while promoting social progress and the sharing of wealth.

=== Socialist nationalism ===
Socialist nationalism is a concept that refers to the combination of socialism with nationalism or with some form of national sentiment or nationality. The term contrasts with the internationalism of Marxist socialism and is generally applied to certain non-Marxist variants of socialism such as the Burmese Way to Socialism, pan-Arab Nasserism and Ba'athism, African socialism and neosocialism in France.

Some forms are influenced by Marxism while being independent of it such as Sandinismo and Chavismo.

Left-wing nationalisms that have not been influenced by Marxism are mostly hostile to Marxist principles of proletarian internationalism, class struggle and state atheism, particularly forms influenced by religious socialisms or defending moderate secularism.

=== Marxist interpretation ===
Marxism identifies the nation as a socioeconomic construction created after the collapse of the feudal system which was utilized to create the capitalist economic system. Classical Marxists have unanimously claimed that nationalism is a bourgeois phenomenon that is not associated with Marxism. In certain instances, Marxism has supported patriotic movements if they were in the interest of class struggle, but rejects other nationalist movements deemed to distract workers from their necessary goal of defeating the bourgeoisie. Marxists have evaluated certain nations to be progressive and other nations to be reactionary. Joseph Stalin supported interpretations of Marx tolerating the use of proletarian patriotism that promoted class struggle within an internationalist framework.

Karl Marx and Friedrich Engels interpreted issues concerning nationality on a social evolutionary basis. Marx and Engels claim that the creation of the modern nation state is the result of the replacement of feudalism with the capitalist mode of production. With the replacement of feudalism with capitalism, capitalists sought to unify and centralize populations' culture and language within states in order to create conditions conducive to a market economy in terms of having a common language to coordinate the economy, contain a large enough population in the state to insure an internal division of labor and contain a large enough territory for a state to maintain a viable economy.

Although Marx and Engels saw the origins of the nation state and national identity as bourgeois in nature, both believed that the creation of the centralized state as a result of the collapse of feudalism and creation of capitalism had created positive social conditions to stimulate class struggle. Marx followed Georg Wilhelm Friedrich Hegel's view that the creation of individual-centered civil society by states as a positive development in that it dismantled previous religious-based society and freed individual conscience. In The German Ideology, Marx claims that although civil society is a capitalist creation and represents bourgeois class rule, it is beneficial to the proletariat because it is unstable in that neither states nor the bourgeoisie can control a civil society. Marx described this in detail in The German Ideology, stating:

Civil society embraces the whole material intercourse of individuals within a definite stage of development of productive forces. It embraces the whole commercial and industrial life of a given stage, and, insofar, transcends the state and the nation, though on the other hand, it must assert itself in its foreign relations as nationality and inwardly must organize itself as a state.

Marx and Engels evaluated progressive nationalism as involving the destruction of feudalism and believed that it was a beneficial step, but they evaluated nationalism detrimental to the evolution of international class struggle as reactionary and necessary to be destroyed. Marx and Engels believed that certain nations that could not consolidate viable nation-states should be assimilated into other nations that were more viable and further in Marxian evolutionary economic progress.

On the issue of nations and the proletariat, The Communist Manifesto says:

The working men have no country. We cannot take from them what they have not got. Since the proletariat must first of all acquire political supremacy, must rise to be the leading class of the nation, must constitute itself the nation, it is so far, itself national, though not in the bourgeois sense of the word. National differences and antagonism between peoples are daily more and more vanishing, owing to the development of the bourgeoisie, to freedom of commerce, to the world market, to uniformity in the mode of production and in the conditions of life corresponding thereto. The supremacy of the proletariat will cause them to vanish still faster. United action, of the leading civilized countries at least, is one of the first conditions for the emancipation of the proletariat.

In general, Marx preferred internationalism and interaction between nations in class struggle, saying in Preface to the Contribution to the Critique of Political Economy that "[o]ne nation can and should learn from others". Similarly, although Marx and Engels criticized Irish unrest for delaying a worker's revolution in England, they believed that Ireland was oppressed by Great Britain, but that the Irish people would better serve their own interests by joining proponents of class struggle in Europe as Marx and Engels claimed that the socialist workers of Europe were the natural allies of Ireland. Marx and Engels also believed that it was in Britain's best interest to let Ireland go as the Ireland issue was being used by elites to unite the British working class with the elites against the Irish.

==== Stalinism and revolutionary patriotism ====
Joseph Stalin promoted a civic patriotic concept called revolutionary patriotism in the Soviet Union. As a youth, Stalin had been active in the Georgian nationalist movement and was influenced by Ilia Chavchavadze, who promoted cultural nationalism, material development of the Georgian people, statist economy and education systems. When Stalin joined the Georgian Marxists, Marxism in Georgia was heavily influenced by Noe Zhordania, who evoked Georgian patriotic themes and opposition to Russian imperial control of Georgia. Zhordania claimed that communal bonds existed between peoples that created the plural sense of countries and went further to say that the Georgian sense of identity pre-existed capitalism and the capitalist conception of nationhood.

After becoming a Bolshevik in the 20th century, he became fervently opposed to national culture, denouncing the concept of contemporary nationality as bourgeois in origin and accused nationality of causing retention of "harmful habits and institutions". However, Stalin believed that cultural communities did exist where people lived common lives and were united by holistic bonds, claiming that there were real nations while others that did not fit these traits were paper nations. Stalin defined the nation as being "neither racial nor tribal, but a historically formed community of people". Stalin believed that the assimilation of primitive nationalities like Abkhazians and Tartars into the Georgian and Russian nations was beneficial. Stalin claimed that all nations were assimilating foreign values and that the nationality as a community was diluting under the pressures of capitalism and with rising rational universality.

In 1913, Stalin rejected the concept of national identity entirely and advocated in favor of a universal cosmopolitan modernity. Stalin identified Russian culture as having greater universalist identity than that of other nations. Stalin's view of vanguard and progressive nations such as Russia, Germany and Hungary in contrast to nations he deemed primitive is claimed to be related to Engels' views.

==== Titoism ====
The Socialist Federal Republic of Yugoslavia under the rule of Josip Broz Tito and the League of Communists of Yugoslavia promoted both Marxism–Leninism and Yugoslav nationalism (Yugoslavism), i.e. socialist patriotism. Tito's Yugoslavia was overtly nationalistic in its attempts to promote unity between the Yugoslav nations within Yugoslavia and asserting Yugoslavia's independence. To unify the Yugoslav nations, the government promoted the concept of brotherhood and unity in which the Yugoslav nations would overcome their cultural and linguistic differences through promoting fraternal relations between the nations. This nationalism was opposed to cultural assimilation as had been carried out by the previous Yugoslav monarchy, but it was instead based upon multiculturalism.

While promoting a Yugoslav nationalism, the Yugoslav government was staunchly opposed to any factional ethnic nationalism or domination by the existing nationalities as Tito denounced ethnic nationalism in general as being based on hatred and was the cause of war. The League of Communists of Yugoslavia blamed the factional division and conflict between the Yugoslav nations on foreign imperialism. Tito built strong relations with states that had strong socialist and nationalist governments in power such as Egypt under Gamal Abdel Nasser and India under Jawaharlal Nehru. In spite of these attempts to create a left-wing Yugoslav national identity, factional divisions between Yugoslav nationalities remained strong and it was largely the power of the party and popularity of Tito that held the country together.

== List of left-wing nationalist political parties ==
=== Current parties ===
- Angola : People's Movement for the Liberation of Angola
- Armenia : Armenian Revolutionary Federation
- Argentina: Homeland Force
- Brazil: Democratic Labour Party
- Cuba: Communist Party of Cuba
- Czech Republic: Enough!
- Germany : Sahra Wagenknecht Alliance – Reason and Justice
- Greece : Course of Freedom, Democratic Social Movement, Panhellenic Socialist Movement (1974–1996)
- Hungary : Hungarian Workers' Party
- India : Forward Bloc
- Indonesia : Indonesian Democratic Party of Struggle
- Ireland: Sinn Féin, Éirígí, Irish Republican Socialist Party, Republican Sinn Féin, Workers' Party
- Israel: The Democrats, Balad
- Kosovo: Vetëvendosje
- Libya: Popular Front for the Liberation of Libya
- Mexico: National Regeneration Movement
- Moldova: Party of Socialists of the Republic of Moldova
- North Korea: Workers' Party of Korea
- North Macedonia: The Left
- Palestine: Fatah, PFLP
- Peru: Peruvian Nationalist Party
- Philippines: Bagong Alyansang Makabayan, Makabayan, Akbayan, Communist Party of the Philippines
- Poland: Self-Defence of the Republic of Poland
- Romania: Social Democratic Party
- Russia: Communist Party of Russian Federation, Just Russia
- Serbia: Socialist Party of Serbia
- Slovakia: Direction – Social Democracy
- South Africa: African National Congress, Economic Freedom Fighters
- South Korea: Progressive Party, People's Democracy Party
- Spain: EH Bildu, Popular Unity Candidacy, Galician Nationalist Bloc, Republican Left of Catalonia
- Taiwan: Taiwan Statebuilding Party, (Note: TSP was once described as a left-wing, progressive and pro-independence party. The TSP advocates the Taiwan independence left-wing and has a strong anti-Chinese sentiment; it has been described as "far-right" by some media.) Social Democratic Party, New Power Party
- Turkey: Patriotic Party, Republican People's Party
- Ukraine: Radical Party of Oleh Liashko
- United Kingdom: Social Democratic Party, Plaid Cymru, Sinn Féin in Northern Ireland, Social Democratic and Labour Party, Scottish Socialist Party, Workers Party of Britain, Scottish National Party
- Venezuela: United Socialist Party of Venezuela

=== Historical parties ===
- Democratic Republic of the Congo: Congolese National Movement, Unified Lumumbist Party
- France: Jacobins (The Mountain)
- Georgia: Social Democratic Party of Georgia, Georgian Socialist-Federalist Revolutionary Party
- Germany: National-Social Association, Old Social Democratic Party of Germany
- Iraq: Arab Socialist Ba'ath Party – Iraq Region
- Israel: Mapam, Mapai, Ahdut HaAvoda, Rafi, Ratz, Israeli Labor Party, Meretz
- Italy: Young Italy, Historical Far Left
- Syria: Arab Socialist Ba'ath Party – Syria Region
- Taiwan: Taiwan Revolutionary Party, Taiwan Independence Party, Taiwanese People's Party

== See also ==
- Anarchism and nationalism
- Ba'athism
- Bolivarian Revolution
- Burmese Way to Socialism
- Classical radicalism
- Egalitarianism
- Epochalism
- Ethnocacerism (element)
- Ho Chi Minh Thought
- Hoxhaism
- Three Principles of the People
- Indigenism
  - Indigenismo
- Juche
- Kirchnerism
- Labor mobility
- Labor Zionism
- Left Kemalism
- Localist camp (element)
- Left-wing populism
- Maoism
- Nasserism
- National communism
- National Democracy (Philippines)
- National liberation (Marxism)
- National Question
- New Nationalism (Theodore Roosevelt)
- Progressivism in Taiwan
  - Pan-Green Coalition
  - Taiwan Go Go
- Proletarian internationalism
- Socialist patriotism
- Wars of national liberation

== Bibliography ==
- Borkenau, Franz (2013). Socialism: National or International (reprinted ed.). Milton: Routledge. ISBN 9781135025823.
- Devlin, John F. (1975). The Ba'th Party: A History from its origins to 1966 (2nd ed.). Hoover Institution Press. ISBN 978-0-8179-6561-7.
- Frankel, Jonathan. 1981 [1984]. Prophecy and Politics: Socialism, Nationalism, and the Russian Jews, 1862-1917. Cambridge: Cambridge University Press.
- Milner, Henry and Sheilagh Hodgins. 1973. The Decolonization of Quebec: An Analysis of Left-Wing Nationalism. Toronto: McClelland and Stewart. p. 257 Archived 17 May 2009 at the Wayback Machine.
- Milner, Henry. 1989. Sweden: Social Democracy in Practice. New York: Oxford University Press.
- Nimni, Ephraim. 1991. Marxism and Nationalism: Theoretical Origins of a Political Crisis. London: Pluto Press.
- Pask, Kevin. "Late Nationalism: The Case of Quebec", New Left Review, 11, September–October 2001 (preview Archived 5 October 2023 at the Wayback Machine)
- Perica, Vjekoslav. 2002. Balkan Idols: Religion and Nationalism in Yugoslav States. New York: Oxford University Press.
- Ramet, Sabrina P. 2006. The Three Yugoslavias: State-building and Legitimation, 1918-2005. Bloomington: Indiana University Press.
- Sa'adah, Anne. 1987 [2003]. Contemporary France: a democratic education. Lanham: Rowman Littlefield & Publishers.
- Schmitt, Richard. 1997, "Introduction to Marx and Engels: A Critical Reconstruction." Dimensions of Philosophy Series. Boulder and Oxford: Westview Press.
- Smith, Angel; Berger, Stefan. 1999. Nationalism, Labour and Ethnicity 1870-1939. Manchester and New York: Manchester University Press.
- Taras, Ray (ed.). 1992. The Road to Disillusion: From Critical Marxism to Post-communism in Eastern Europe. Armonk: M. E. Sharpe.
- van Ree, Erik. 2002. The Political Thought of Joseph Stalin: A Study in twentieth-century Revolutionary Patriotism. London and New York: RoutledgeCurzon.
- Wachtel, Andrew. 2006. Remaining Relevant after Communism: The Role of the Writer in Eastern Europe. Chicago and London: University of Chicago Press.
